= List of Regular Show characters =

These characters appear in the American animated television series Regular Show, created by J. G. Quintel for Cartoon Network.

The series revolves around the daily lives of two friends, Mordecai (a blue jay), and Rigby (a raccoon). They work as groundskeepers at a park, and spend their days trying to avoid work and entertain themselves by any means. This is much to the chagrin of their boss Benson (a gumball machine) and their coworker Skips (a yeti), but to the delight of Pops (a lollipop). Their other coworkers include a pig-nosed green humanoid nicknamed Muscle Man (real name Mitch Sorrenstein), and a ghost nicknamed Hi-Five Ghost (real name not mentioned in the show).

== Overview ==
Character	Voice actor	Seasons										
Character	Voice actor	1	2	3	4	5	6	7	The Movie	8	The Lost Tapes	Shorts
Main
Mordecai	J. G. Quintel	Main	Main	Main	Main	Main	Main	Main	Main	Main	Main	Main
Rigby	William Salyers	Main	Main	Main	Main	Main	Main	Main	Main	Main	Main	Main
Benson Dunwoody	Sam Marin	Main	Main	Main	Main	Main	Main	Main	Main	Main	Main	Main
Skips / Walks	Mark Hamill	Main	Main	Main	Main	Main	Main	Main	Main	Main	Main	Main
Pops Maellard / Mega Kranus	Sam Marin	Main	Main	Main	Main	Main	Main	Main	Main	Main	Main	Main
Mitch "Muscle Man" Sorrenstein	Sam Marin	Main	Main	Main	Main	Main	Main	Main	Main	Main	Main	Main
Hi-Five Ghost	J. G. Quintel	Main	Main	Main	Main	Main	Main	Main	Main	Main	Main	Main
Thomas / Nikolai	Roger Craig Smith				Main	Main	Guest	Guest			Recurring	
Eileen Roberts	Minty Lewis		Recurring	Recurring	Recurring	Recurring	Recurring	Recurring	Guest	Main	Recurring	
Recurring
Margaret Smith	Janie Haddad	Recurring	Recurring	Recurring	Recurring	Guest	Recurring	Recurring	Guest	Recurring	Recurring	
Guardians of Eternal Youth	Robin Atkin Downes; David Kaye	Guest		Recurring	Recurring	Recurring		Guest	Recurring	Recurring		
Gary	Robin Atkin Downes	Guest		Recurring	Recurring	Recurring		Recurring	Recurring			
Don	Julian Rebolledo	Guest				Recurring		Recurring		Guest		
The Sensei	Sam Marin	Guest			Recurring	Recurring	Guest	Guest				
Mr. Maellard	David Ogden Stiers		Guest	Guest	Recurring	Recurring	Recurring	Recurring	Recurring			
Starla Gutsmandottir	Courtenay Taylor		Guest	Guest	Recurring	Recurring	Recurring	Recurring		Guest		
Death	Julian Holloway		Guest	Recurring	Recurring	Recurring	Guest			Recurring		
John "Muscle Bro" Sorrenstein	Steve Blum		Guest	Guest	Recurring	Recurring	Recurring					
Low-Five Ghost	Roger Craig Smith		Guest		Recurring	Recurring	Guest	Recurring				
Baby Ducks / Hyperduck	J. G. Quintel; William Salyers; Sam Marin		Guest		Recurring		Guest			Guest		
Garrett Bobby Ferguson	Sam Marin		Guest		Guest	Guest				Guest		
CJ / Cloudy Jay	Linda Cardellini			Guest		Recurring	Recurring	Guest				

== Main characters ==
=== Mordecai ===
Mordecai
- Regular Show character
- First appearance: 2 in the AM PM (2006 short film)
- Created by: J. G. Quintel
- Designed by: J. G. Quintel
- Voiced by: J. G. Quintel

In-universe information
- Species: Blue jay
- Gender: Male
- Occupation: Park groundskeeper (formerly); Artist (currently)
- Affiliation: Park Workers; Mordecai and the Rigbys; Dome Subjects
- Family: William (father); Hillary (mother)
- Spouse: Stef (wife)
- Significant others: Various unnamed ex-girlfriends; Margaret Smith (ex-girlfriend); CJ (ex-girlfriend)
- Children: Two unnamed sons and one unnamed daughter (All with Stef)
- Relatives: Steve (uncle); Maxine (aunt)
- Nationality: American

Mordecai (voiced by J. G. Quintel) is a 23-year-old anthropomorphic blue jay who works as a groundskeeper at The Park. He has been best friends with Rigby ever since childhood. Mordecai is more conscientious, intelligent, responsible, and mature about his actions than Rigby is, which sometimes leads to him opposing Rigby when he is the cause of some kind of chaotic problem, albeit unintentionally. Even though Mordecai hates his job, he is often willing to put up with it begrudgingly as opposed to Rigby, who is more open about his hatred towards his job and prone to avoid work as much as possible. However, Mordecai usually sides with his friend, occasionally going along with Rigby's attempts to get out of work and the two generally stick together through their adventures.

Mordecai loves to play video games and in most cases is a better player than Rigby, he also demonstrates decent strength, such as carrying large boulders, fighting the death bear, never getting hurt by Rigby's punches, and being able to punch Rigby across an entire room with ease. He can sometimes become caught up in his emotions, often letting them get the better of him. However, he is usually quick to apologize to others if he has hurt them and most of the time takes the lead in fixing a situation.

Mordecai's romantic life is the subject of several episodes, particularly his crush on Margaret Smith, a red-breasted robin who worked as a waitress at a local coffee shop. Mordecai would often hang out with her, along with Rigby and Eileen Roberts. Mordecai had many failed attempts at starting a relationship with her due to either his own nerves or Margaret having a boyfriend at the time. He attempts to date other people in "Yes Dude Yes" and meets CJ. Though the two have a lot in common they part ways at the end of the episode. Mordecai and Margaret finally begin to date in the fourth season until Margaret decides to leave for college, thus ending their relationship and causing Mordecai to go into a brief depression.

Mordecai later bumps into CJ at a New Year's Eve party and they start dating soon after. CJ and Mordecai's relationship is strained due to CJ seeing Mordecai and Margaret having fun together on several occasions as she returned from college. He eventually decides to take a break from dating in "Dumped at the Altar", after his relationship with CJ didn't work out.

In the episode "Camping Can Be Cool", it is revealed that he attended art school before being employed at The Park; however, he did not finish school due to his bad portrait skills, which were revealed in the episode "Bad Portrait". He is shown to have an outgoing mom, who embarrasses him around his girlfriends and also made a highlight reel of Mordecai's most embarrassing moments, as seen in "Maxin' and Relaxin'".

In the epilogue to "A Regular Epic Final Battle", Mordecai quits The Park, parts ways with Rigby, moves to New York City, and returns to making art. He opens a successful exhibition and meets a bat woman whom he eventually marries and starts a family. Mordecai's wife was not given a name in the show. Head writer Matt Price, on Reddit, gave her the name Stef when asked about it, and writer Owen Dennis stated on Tumblr that there had not been previous plans to give a name to the character.

=== Rigby ===
Rigby
- Regular Show character
- First appearance: "The Pilot" (2009)
- Created by: J. G. Quintel
- Designed by: J. G. Quintel
- Voiced by: William Salyers

In-universe information
- Species: Raccoon
- Gender: Male
- Occupation: Park groundskeeper (formerly)
- Affiliation: Park Workers; Mordecai and the Rigbys; Dome Subjects
- Family: Sherm (father); Barbara (mother); Don (younger brother)
- Spouse: Eileen Roberts (wife)
- Children: Two unnamed daughters
- Nationality: American

Rigby (voiced by William Salyers) is a 3'5" 23-year-old anthropomorphic brown raccoon who works as a groundskeeper at The Park. He has been best friends with Mordecai since childhood and is more prone to slacking off than Mordecai is. Rigby is hyperactive and extremely mischievous, which sometimes puts him at odds with Mordecai. He mostly lives for simply having a good time and relaxing, which he achieves occasionally through selfish acts like lying or cheating. His immaturity often gets the better of him and puts others into trouble, often causing many of the chaotic and surreal problems that arise in The Park. Mordecai punches him on the arm for this as a running gag. Nevertheless, he has a genuinely good heart deep down, so he sticks closely to his friends and feels terrible remorse for his choices which clearly reflect a lack of foresight rather than cold-blooded sociopathy.

Like Mordecai, Rigby loves to play video games, but he is the worse of the two in most cases. He is also shown to be the weakest of The Park workers, although he has surprised them on a few occasions. Rigby's lack of strength was a major plot point in the episode "One Pull Up", in which Rigby had to pass a company physical and keep his job by performing one pull up. He has a younger brother named Don, whose height and physique lead people to believe that he, not Rigby, is the elder brother.

It is hinted in the episode "'Ello Gov'nor" that Rigby's last name may be Riggerson, however, this has neither been confirmed nor denied by J. G. Quintel.

Eileen Roberts, a female mole who works at a local coffee shop, previously alongside Margaret Smith, has strong feelings for Rigby and makes this very obvious. He originally did not reciprocate her feelings and harshly ignored her several times, but he quickly begins to warm up to her and implies that he likes her, as well. In "Dumped at the Altar", Rigby reveals to Mordecai that he and Eileen have been dating for 3 months.

Rigby is allergic to eggs, as evidenced in the episode "Eggscellent" when Rigby tried to eat a 12-egg omelet to win a trucker hat and went into a coma due to a severe allergic reaction. Rigby also faced death several times and actually died four of those times, but was swiftly resurrected. As of Rigby's Graduation Day Special, Rigby has finally graduated from high school.

In the epilogue to "A Regular Epic Final Battle", Rigby quits The Park and moves in with Eileen. They eventually get married and start a family.

=== Benson Dunwoody ===
Benson
- Regular Show character
- First appearance: "2 in The AM PM" (2006)
- Created by: J. G. Quintel
- Designed by: J. G. Quintel
- Voiced by: Sam Marin

In-universe information
- Full name: Benson Dunwoody
- Species: Anthropomorphic gumball machine
- Gender: Male
- Occupation: Drummer (for Hair to the Throne) (formerly); Construction worker (in "Exit 9B"); Park manager (formerly); Park owner (currently)
- Affiliation: Hair to the Throne; Park Workers; Dome Subjects
- Family: Unknown father; Unknown mother; Unknown sister
- Spouse: Pam Dunwoody
- Significant others: Ashley (ex-girlfriend); Monica (ex-girlfriend); Patricia (ex-girlfriend); Audrey (ex-girlfriend)
- Nationality: American

Benson Dunwoody (voiced by Sam Marin) is a grumpy, austere, no-nonsense but well-meaning middle-aged 5'4" anthropomorphic gumball machine who works as the manager of The Park. Usually he is at constant odds with Mordecai and Rigby; he is only occasionally depicted as being at odds with Muscle Man and Hi Five Ghost. He tends to yell at his employees when they are slacking off and not working, and frequently threatens to get them fired, although he was never successful. His full name is revealed in the episode "The Dome Experiment".

Despite being at constant odds with them, Benson becomes more friendly toward Mordecai and Rigby after calming down in the episode "Benson Be Gone" and the three subsequently bond as the series progresses (he especially softens up to Mordecai in particular, as Mordecai exhibits more maturity and a willingness to learn and grow from his mistakes that Rigby severely lacks). He is skilled at stick hockey and formerly played the game competitively. Benson has a strong love for music, and is revealed to be a former drummer for the band "Hair to the Throne" in the episode "150 Piece Kit": having performed a seemingly impossible drum solo for the band during his youth.

Benson used to date Audrey, a human woman who lives across from him in his apartment complex. It is revealed that they broke up in "The Real Thomas", in which Benson starts to date an undercover Russian spy named Natalia, although she is later eaten by a whale.

In the episode "Pam I Am", Benson develops feelings for one of the dome scientists named Pam and they go on a 'date'. However, Dr. Langer witnesses the 'date' and makes a new rule that forbids the dome staff from dating anyone who works at the park. At the end of the episode, it is implied that Benson and Pam will date once the dome is gone. During the beginning of the episode "Fries Night", Benson contacts Pam back on earth, to which she revealed that having a "long distance" relationship with Benson because he is now in space is too difficult for her. She states that the reason for the break up is that she doesn't know when or if he will ever return to earth again. They both agree to become friends even though Benson later gets depressed from yet another break up with a woman he really cared for.

In the epilogue to "A Regular Epic Final Battle", Benson becomes Mr. Maellard's caretaker, who eventually leaves behind his possessions as well as the ownership of The Park to Benson: the only person as close to him as Pops, possibly due to his gratitude toward Benson for all his hard work as a steadfast park manager. Despite this, a running gag throughout the series features Mr. Maellard forgetting Benson's name.

He gets back together with Pam, and they apparently adopt Applesauce as well as a variety of cats.

=== Pops Maellard/Mega Kranus ===
Pops
- Regular Show character
- First appearance: "The Naive Man from Lolliland" (2005)
- Created by: J. G. Quintel
- Designed by: J. G. Quintel
- Voiced by: J. G. Quintel (2006); Sam Marin (2005, 2010–present)

In-universe information
- Full name: Mega Kranus
- Nickname: Pops Maellard/Pops
- Species: Lollipop
- Gender: Male
- Occupation: Entomologist (in "Exit 9B"); Park manager
- Affiliation: Park Workers; Mordecai and the Rigbys; Dome Subjects
- Family: Mr. Maellard (adoptive father; deceased); Miss Maellard (adoptive mother; deceased); Anti-Pops/Malum Kranus (biological brother; deceased)
- Nationality: American

Pops Maellard (later revealed to be Mega Kranus; voiced by Sam Marin) is a cheerful and somewhat naive 6'2" humanoid lollipop man who resides at the house in The Park and always talks in a whiny-like tone. His adoptive father, Mr. Maellard, is the owner of The Park. Pops tends to be very ecstatic about everything, often exclaiming "Good show!" or "Jolly good show!" when he is happy about something. When something bad happens, he will instead say "Bad show."

Pops tends to dress and act like he is in the late 1800s to early 1900s and utilizes technology and slang from that time period. He carries small butterscotch lollipops in his wallet, sincerely believing that they are real money, much to everyone's confusion. He is an upright gentleman who is very kind and well-mannered to everyone. He is also very sensitive, often becoming upset or crying if his feelings are hurt. He has strong interests in poetry, wrestling, music, nature, animals, and games. Despite being an elderly man, he is very childish and is often oblivious to serious things around him. Because of this, the group frequently looks after him, especially Benson.

Pops has also been shown to have immense strength on several occasions, despite his slim build. In the episode "Prank Callers", it is shown that Pops was once a more serious and mature man back in the early 1980s. However, when Mordecai and Rigby had been sent back to that time and accidentally hit him with a golf cart, he is shown to have turned into his zany self. Pops once owned a British doll named Percival, or Percy, who turned his back on him and tried to kill Pops in "Terror Tales of the Park". Pops is also one with nature, but lost it until he tries to find the answer to get it back, as shown in "Catching the Wave".

In Season 8, Pops is revealed to be the universe's Chosen One due to being born with god-like abilities, as well as having an evil younger twin brother who has the ability to erase a person from existence. Pops' destiny is to kill Malum Kranus, later nicknamed "Anti-Pops", his brother, to prevent the destruction of the universe. In "A Regular Epic Final Battle", it is revealed that his real name is Mega Kranus. Pops realizes that the best way to defeat Malum Kranus is with kindness. Pops gives Malum Kranus a hug and the two fly into the sun, killing them both in the process, and the universe is saved. In Heaven, Pops' voice is heard saying his catchphrase 'Jolly Good Show' as a VHS of the show ejects itself from a Hanatronic TV, which was seen in "Eileen Flat Screen", and the series itself concludes.

=== Skips/Walks ===
Skips
- Regular Show character
- First appearance: The Pilot (2009)
- Created by: J. G. Quintel
- Designed by: J. G. Quintel
- Voiced by: Mark Hamill

In-universe information
- Full name: Skips
- Species: Yeti
- Gender: Male
- Occupation: Park groundskeeper Mechanic
- Affiliation: Park Workers; Mordecai and the Rigbys; Dome Subjects; Guardians of Eternal Youth
- Significant others: Mona (girlfriend, deceased); Sheena (ex-girlfriend)
- Relatives: Quips Quippenger (cousin)
- Nationality: American

Skips (born Walks; voiced by Mark Hamill impersonating Harvey Fierstein) is an immortal 6'5" yeti who works as a groundskeeper at The Park. He is the strongest and smartest of The Park workers and they almost always turn to him for help, as he usually knows how to solve the chaotic problems that arise; however, he isn't always right. Whenever he is asked for help, he generally says, "I've seen this before", and then presents a solution. He sometimes serves as a peacemaker during times of conflict, using his imposing stature and demeanor as a way of discouraging others from getting out of control in heated situations (though he is also prone to outbursts of his own on rare occasions).

As his name suggests, he is always skipping rather than walking or running. The reason why he always skips is discovered in the episode "Skips' Story," where it is learned that he had a girlfriend long ago, prior to him becoming immortal. The two of them constantly skipped. When she died, he vowed to only skip to honor Mona, his dead girlfriend and the only person he ever loved.

He is a diligent worker and is very skilled at his job; however, he suffers from a lack of knowledge of computers and other kinds of newer technology, which was seen in the episode "Skips vs. Technology" where Mordecai and Rigby jam a printer and crash the computer whilst printing a card for Skips thanking him for his efforts to save them from being fired by Benson for their antics. Aside from this, he is very experienced and knowledgeable, as he is immortal and has been alive for hundreds of years.

In the episode "Free Cake", it is revealed that he must perform a ceremonial dance every year on his birthday to maintain his immortality. The episode "Skips' Story" reveals that he was given immortality by the Guardians of Eternal Youth to fight Klorgbane, a bully who inadvertently killed his girlfriend, Mona, during a fistfight.

In the epilogue to "A Regular Epic Final Battle", Skips remains working at The Park while having a new part-time job as a mechanic, satisfied with his life.

=== Muscle Man ===
Muscle Man
- Regular Show character
- First appearance: The Pilot (2009) (non-speaking cameo)
- Created by: J. G. Quintel
- Designed by: J. G. Quintel
- Voiced by: Sam Marin

In-universe information
- Full name: Mitch Sorrenstein
- Nickname: Muscle Man
- Species: Pig-nosed humanoid
- Gender: Male
- Occupation: Bodybuilder (formerly); College professor (in "Exit 9B"); Park groundskeeper (formerly)
- Affiliation: Mordecai and the Rigbys; Park Workers; Dome Subjects
- Family: Muscle Dad (father, deceased); Muscle Mom (mother); Muscle Bro/John Sorrenstein (brother)
- Spouse: Starla Gutsmandottir-Sorrenstein (wife)
- Children: Various unnamed children
- Nationality: American

Mitchell "Muscle Man" Sorrenstein (voiced by Sam Marin) is a 5'8" 25-year-old obese, green-skinned man who works as a groundskeeper at the Park. He is very erratic and immature, often pulling pranks and joking around. He enjoys telling "My mom!" jokes, botched attempts at "Yo mama" jokes, much to the annoyance of everyone except Hi Five Ghost, his best friend. Although he can be rude due to his ego, he is ultimately shown to be polite, caring and resourceful toward his friends. At times, he can burst out on a rampage if he is greatly angered. A running gag throughout the show is Muscle Man always 'knowing a guy', often getting the main cast out of difficult situations.

His father, Muscle Dad, enjoyed the same attitude for pranks and jokes, but died in the episode "Trucker Hall of Fame". His elder brother John, who goes by Muscle Bro, is also seen throughout the series. Muscle Man originally shared a rivalry with Mordecai and Rigby throughout the first two seasons. He began to get along with them and treat each other as friends when the third season began. His girlfriend, Starla, shares a similar appearance to him and the couple constantly disgust other people when they publicly kiss and show affection to each other. His real name was revealed to be Mitch Sorrenstein in the episode "Muscle Woman" (in an early episode, it was originally listed as 'Steve Musselman', this was changed for unknown reasons). He is revealed to be Jewish in "The Christmas Special" in which he reveals he celebrates Hanukkah.

In "Power Tower", it is revealed that he gained the nickname "Muscle Man" from his early years of bodybuilding and actually being in excellent physical condition, but he found that life very boring and gave it up. In "The End of Muscle Man", he proposes to Starla and the two become engaged and they later marry in "Dumped at the Altar".

In the epilogue to "A Regular Epic Final Battle", upon returning home Muscle Man discovers he has a three-year-old daughter. He and Starla live out their days in their trailer park home and have numerous children. It was revealed in "Trailer Trashed" that the trailer was his prize for winning a hot dog eating contest.

=== Hi-Five Ghost ===
Hi-Five Ghost
- Regular Show character
- First appearance: The Pilot (2009) (non-speaking cameo)
- Created by: J. G. Quintel
- Designed by: J. G. Quintel
- Voiced by: Jeff Glen Bennett (Season 1); J. G. Quintel (Seasons 2–8, Regular Show: The Lost Tapes)

In-universe information
- Full name: Hi-Five Ghost
- Nicknames: Hi-Fives; Fives
- Species: Ghost
- Gender: Male
- Occupation: Park groundskeeper (formerly); Pizza delivery man (in "Exit 9B"); DJ (currently)
- Spouse: Celia (wife)
- Children: unnamed son
- Nationality: American

Hi-Five Ghost (voiced by Jeff Bennett in season one, then by J. G. Quintel for the remainder of the series) is a friendly and laid-back 5'7" ghost with a hand extending from the top of his head who works as a groundskeeper at The Park. Hi-Five Ghost is best friends with Muscle Man and frequently gives him high fives to accompany his jokes, as he genuinely finds most of Muscle Man's jokes amusing. Because of his name and appearance, he is frequently called by his nickname, "Hi-Fives", and sometimes simply as "Fives". Hi-Five Ghost rarely speaks throughout the first three seasons of the series, but he is given more dialogue from seasons four to eight. His father was introduced in the episode "See You There", as well as his older brother Low Five Ghost, who works as a police officer.

In the episode "The Postcard", Hi-Five Ghost reunited with a human girl named Celia whom he had befriended at a cafe after waiting four years to receive a postcard from her in Prague.

In the epilogue to "A Regular Epic Final Battle", Hi-Five Ghost and Celia become a married DJ duo and tour the world together. They have a son together.

=== Eileen ===
Eileen
- Regular Show character
- First appearance: Brain Eraser (2011) (cameo)
- Created by: J. G. Quintel; Minty Lewis
- Designed by: Minty Lewis
- Voiced by: Minty Lewis

In-universe information
- Full name: Eileen Roberts
- Species: Mole
- Gender: Female
- Occupation: Waitress (formerly); Park groundskeeper (formerly)
- Affiliation: Dome Subjects
- Family: Unnamed father
- Spouse: Rigby (husband)
- Children: Two unknown daughters
- Nationality: American

Eileen Roberts (voiced by Minty Lewis, a writer/storyboard artist for the series) is a 3'8" anthropomorphic mole who works as a waitress at a local coffee shop, previously alongside Margaret. She has a crush on Rigby, but he initially found her annoying before eventually having a change of heart. She is notable for her intelligence and displays many skills and hobbies throughout the series including dancing, sewing, geology and astronomy. One of Eileen's odd personality quirks is her affinity for sea turtles, which is referenced in a few episodes. She's a recurring character in seasons 2–7, and becomes a main character in season 8.

Eileen first appeared and met Mordecai and Rigby in the episode "Brain Eraser", in which she was puzzled by the former's awkward behavior toward Margaret. She also appears in the episode "Do Me a Solid", in which Rigby learns of Eileen's crush on him. Although he does not reciprocate, he still goes along with it for a while. Since the episode "Camping Can Be Cool", Rigby has warmed up to, and fully reciprocated towards Eileen. He thought very highly of her and praised her actions throughout the episode. In the episode "Diary", Rigby admits that he finds Eileen to be attractive when she is not wearing her glasses, but it is also revealed that she cannot see without them, suggesting she has at least moderate myopia. In the episode "One Pull Up", Eileen helps Rigby train for the Park employees' physical test and he shows his gratitude by hugging her (and breaking her spine and all her ribs due to his enlarged physique). In the episodes "Play Date" and "Eileen Flat Screen", it is revealed that Eileen and Rigby have been spending more time together. In "Dumped at the Altar", Rigby tells Mordecai that he and Eileen have been dating for three months. In "Rigby's Graduation Day Special", Eileen finally graduates from college at the same time Rigby finally gets his high school diploma. As she is cooking for a graduation party for her and Rigby, when the guys press the button that sends them and the park into space, Eileen gets stuck with the guys. In the epilogue to "A Regular Epic Final Battle", she and Rigby move in together and start a family.

== Recurring characters ==
=== Nikolai ("Thomas") ===
Nikolai
- Regular Show character
- First appearance: "Exit 9B" (2012)
- Created by: Calvin Wong; Toby Jones; Andres Salaff; Madeline Queripel
- Designed by: J. G. Quintel
- Voiced by: Roger Craig Smith

In-universe information
- Alias: Thomas
- Species: Goat
- Occupation: Park groundskeeper (formerly); Russian spy (formerly)
- Family: Commander Romonaff (adoptive father)
- Nationality: American

Nikolai (seasons 4–7) (voiced by Roger Craig Smith) is a young anthropomorphic goat who is of Ukrainian origin and was trained by the KGB as a ruthless spy, and who later sent him to work for the Russian organization M.O.M.M. (Ministry of Meadow Management), a KGB agency that struggled to find out what made American parks up to date and wealthy. To fix Russia's outdated parks, M.O.M.M. sent out Nikolai on a covert operation to obtain the park and bring it back to Russia. During his undercover mission, he changed his identity to "Thomas" and presented himself as an intern for credits in college in "Exit 9B" (in which he made his debut), working as an unpaid intern who calls his "mom" on a regular basis and is often reproved by his coworkers, most notably by Muscle Man. He is usually reluctant to be involved in the surreal and chaotic adventures that arise in The Park, often asking if he has to be part of the situation, to which they insist that he must. There are times when Nikolai becomes personally invested in maintaining his cover, such as using a robot to pose as his "mom" in "The Thanksgiving Special", and wearing spy attire disguised as a Halloween costume (a slice of pizza, which he had to wear until Thanksgiving Day upon losing a bet in "Terror Tales of the Park III"). When the other Russian spies that were deployed with him carry out the final phase of the plan to bring The Park to Russia in "The Real Thomas", he finally reveals his true identity to the park crew and explains why he is really there. When Nikolai learns the plan is really to destroy the Park through a loophole in Russian/American relations, he turns on his fellow spies for being lied to (along with some persuasion by the park crew to remind him of the good times they had as friends, despite the constant poor treatment he received from them for being an intern), and returns the Park to American soil before going on the run from both sides. He makes several cameos after this, usually in some sort of disguise. Eventually, he returns in "Guys Night 2," revealing himself to be tired of his old life as a spy and wanting to move on to a new life. He feels his only option is to go into hiding forever, but first he enjoys one final hang with the park crew. He made non-speaking cameos in later episodes. In “Rigby's Graduation Special”, he makes a brief cameo by proposing a toast to the park dome taking off into space while in his submarine, hinting that he is aware of their mission and Pops's destiny.

=== Margaret ===
Margaret
- Regular Show character
- First appearance: Caffeinated Concert Tickets (2010)
- Created by: J. G. Quintel; Mike Roth
- Designed by: J. G. Quintel
- Voiced by: Janie Haddad-Tompkins

In-universe information
- Full name: Margaret Smith
- Nicknames: Margie and Margo
- Species: Robin
- Gender: Female
- Occupation: Waitress (formerly); News station intern; Reporter
- Affiliation: Channel 6 News
- Family: Denise Smith (mother); Frank Smith (father)
- Spouse: Del Henlon (fake boyfriend)
- Significant others: Slasher (ex-boyfriend); Angel (ex-boyfriend); Various ex-boyfriends; Mordecai (former romantic interest and ex-boyfriend)
- Relatives: John (cousin); Darryl (cousin); Various extended family members
- Nationality: American

Margaret Smith (voiced by Janie Haddad-Tompkins) is a 5'10" anthropomorphic red-breasted robin who works as a waitress at a local coffee shop. She was good friends with her co-worker, Eileen. Mordecai has a huge crush on Margaret and frequently found excuses to go to the coffee shop to see her. She has a cousin named John who has an artificial wooden leg. The rest of her family are all birds like her and Mordecai, except for her father Frank, a strong and stern human. Margaret returns Mordecai's feelings for her and the two begin to finally date in the fourth season. They broke up in the season finale when Margaret leaves for college. In the episode "Eileen Flat Screen", Margaret returns now as a news reporter, which no one notices. In "Merry Christmas Mordecai", Mordecai becomes nervous when he hears that Margaret will be there. After several awkward encounters, they finally manage to have a normal conversation with both acknowledging that they had some good times. This leads to a montage of memories, ending with a memory of a kiss on a roller coaster. Unfortunately, when the scene flashes to the present, they accidentally kiss on the lips and are shocked when they notice CJ watching them. CJ runs out of the house while Mordecai runs to the back of the house to find his phone; he notices that all of Margaret's stuff is there and Eileen tells him she is her new roommate. Mordecai is stunned when he hears the news and didn't know what to say about Margaret staying with Eileen from now on.

As of "Sad Sax", Mordecai and Margaret are still just friends, and Mordecai makes it up to CJ by telling her the truth.

In "1000th Chopper Flight Party", Mordecai is still awkward with her presence and afraid to screw up, even to the point of letting Rigby constantly mess up the Party as a diversion just to keep her away from him. When he finally is declared as the lucky guest to ride Chopper 6 for its 1000th flight, he finds it hard to say no and joins. Margaret tries to talk to him, but Mordecai awkwardly resists until she scolds him for his attitude in desire for their friendship. Mordecai then lifts the tension with a joke and they finally start to have a fun chat. This however angers CJ, who misinterprets it as them rekindling their love, and she causes havoc with her storm cloud ability. Mordecai tries to save Margaret, but comes short and while dangling from the helicopter, she calms CJ when she reveals that she is in a relationship with news anchor, Del Hanlon, which stuns Mordecai and surprises her parents.

In "Not Great Double Date", Mordecai seemed upset that Margaret had a boyfriend, but still said that she seemed happy with Del and that he liked him. When she confessed that Del was not her boyfriend and that she was tired of feeling like a tourist around her friends because of the tension with CJ, he felt sad about her feeling this way about herself and was pretty interested to know that she still had feelings for him when she was asked by CJ.

In "Just Friends", Rigby and Eileen go to the presentation of martial arts Don, leading to Mordecai and Margaret spending a night that has romantic moments. A chef named Daisuke shows them their future using magical sauce. It is revealed that if, and when, Mordecai and Margaret get together, they will get married, have children, buy their own houseboat, and die peacefully after 50 happy years. Mordecai and Margaret agree that their future looks like it will be really great, but that they are still young and should take it easy on relationships for the time being. At the end of the episode, the two agree to remain just friends, with future Margaret looking down on them and inquiring how long they can be just friends, and future Mordecai stating that "only time will tell."

In "Rigby's Graduation Special", she was very worried as she watched Mordecai and cried as the other park workers being shot into space, even saying his name in concern. However, in the epilogue to "A Regular Epic Final Battle", she is only seen running toward Eileen and hugging her upon her return. She surprisingly does not end up with Mordecai and is not seen with the group 25 years later, though she remains friends with Mordecai and becomes a muse for his art after he quit his job at the park to pursue art.

Head writer Matt Price stated on Reddit that the idea was that Mordecai and Margaret would find their own paths in life. On Tumblr writer Owen Dennis stated that reality shows that many people who initially date one another early on end up with other people, contradicting narrative arcs of many Western entertainment media.

=== Starla Gutsmandottir ===
Starla Guttsmandottir
- Regular Show character
- First appearance: "Muscle Woman" (2011)
- Created by: Benton Connor; Calvin Wong
- Designed by: Benton Connor
- Voiced by: Courtenay Taylor

In-universe information
- Full name: Starla Gutsmandottir-Sorrenstein
- Species: Pig-nosed humanoid
- Gender: Female
- Occupation: Sales clerk at Icy & Hot Jewelry & Apparel
- Family: Herb Gutsmandottir (father); Rose Gutsmandottir (mother); Peggy Gutsmandottir (sister)
- Spouse: Mitch "Muscle Man" Sorrenstein (husband)
- Significant others: Steve (ex-boyfriend); Mordecai (ex-boyfriend)
- Children: Various unnamed children
- Nationality: American

Starla "Muscle Woman" Gutsmandottir-Sorrenstein (voiced by Courtenay Taylor) is an obese green woman similar in appearance to Muscle Man. She works at Icy Hot Jewelry & Apparel. In the episode "Muscle Woman", she developed a crush on Mordecai and had previously dated two other people as indicated by a tattoo on her lower back. She got together with Muscle Man after he expressed his feelings towards her at the end of the episode. Since then, Starla has appeared with Muscle Man in various episodes, including "Fancy Restaurant", "Pie Contest" and "Bald Spot". In the episode "The End of Muscle Man", Muscle Man proposes to Starla and the two become engaged. In the episode "Dumped at the Altar", she marries Muscle Man. In the epilogue to "A Regular Epic Final Battle", Starla is revealed to have had a daughter with him, during the crew's three-year absence. She and Muscle Man live happily in their home and had more children over the years. Starla is one of the few characters who refers to Muscle Man by his real name, Mitch.

=== CJ/Cloudy Jay ===
CJ
- Regular Show character
- First appearance: "Yes Dude Yes" (2012)
- Created by: Sean Szeles; Kat Morris
- Designed by: Sean Szeles
- Voiced by: Linda Cardellini

In-universe information
- Full name: Cloudy Jay
- Nickname: CJ
- Gender: Female
- Occupation: Crossing guard
- Family: Carl Putter (father); Unnamed mother Unnamed Older brothers
- Significant other: Mordecai (ex-boyfriend)
- Nationality: American

Cloudy Jay "CJ" (voiced by Linda Cardellini) is a 5'8" humanoid cloud. She has been Mordecai's girlfriend with reoccurring anger problems. She first appeared in the episode "Yes Dude Yes", in which Mordecai started dating her after thinking Margaret was engaged. After learning that Margaret was not getting married, he almost immediately forgets about CJ, leading to an ugly break up at the coffee shop in which she revealed that she can transform into a deadly storm when really angry and assumed this form in three episodes. After Margaret leaves town for college, CJ and Mordecai meet each other at the New Year's Eve dance in the episode "New Year's Kiss", unwittingly kissing each other at midnight. The following episode, "Dodge This", continues this story days after the kiss with CJ and Mordecai competing against each other in a dodgeball tournament. This leads to awkwardness between the two in the final round of the dodgeball tournament and they are forced to address their issues before the Intergalactic Dodgeball Council. They later agreed just to be friends. At the end of the episode "I Like You Hi", Mordecai asks CJ out and she agrees to go out with Mordecai. In the following episode, "Play Date", CJ and Mordecai plan to go out, but are interrupted by Death's 300-year-old son, Thomas. In the Season 5 finale "Real Date", Mordecai saves her life when the founder of Couple Corral McIntyre tries to get them to break up and they officially become a couple. In "Merry Christmas Mordecai", she sees Mordecai and Margaret accidentally kiss, and drives off heartbroken. In "Sad Sax", Mordecai tries to reconcile with her after receiving advice from "Sad Sax Guy", and they finally get back together. In the episode "1000th Chopper Flight Party", she screws up and ruins their relationship, and she and Mordecai break up in "Dumped at the Altar" and would never speak to each other again. In "Rigby's Graduation Day Special", CJ becomes a crossing guard at the High School. She is not seen in the finale "A Regular Epic Final Battle", however she becomes a muse for Mordecai's art after Mordecai left the park to pursue art.

=== Mr. Maellard ===
Mr. Maellard
- Regular Show character
- First appearance: "Dizzy" (2011)
- Last appearance: "Regular Show: The Lost Tapes: Fix That Tape" (2026) (non-speaking)
- Created by: Sean Szeles; Shion Takeuchi
- Designed by: Shion Takeuchi
- Voiced by: David Ogden Stiers (2011-2016)

In-universe information
- Full name: Mr. Maellard
- Species: Lollipop
- Gender: Male
- Occupation: Park owner
- Family: Unnamed parents Unnamed older brother Unnamed younger sister
- Spouse: Unnamed wife
- Children: Pops (adoptive son)
- Nationality: American

Mr. Maellard (voiced by David Ogden Stiers) is an elderly humanoid lollipop man who owns The Park and is also Pops' adoptive father. He first appeared in the episode "Dizzy". Mr. Maellard is very impatient towards Benson (similar to Benson's impatience towards Mordecai and Rigby) and Mr. Maellard blames their shenanigans on Benson (as he expects Benson to take responsibility for them as the park manager). He purposely mistakes Benson's name a lot in some of the episodes in which he appears (using "Ballbucket", "Beanbag", etc.). Mr. Maellard finally got Benson's name right and started to respect him better in the episode "Benson Be Gone" due to Benson coming to his rescue when he was captured by Susan, a demon disguised as a woman whom he had hired as the park manager after demoting Benson, and also gave Benson his old job back. As the series progresses, he turns from a ruthless and shallow businessman into quite an eccentric character with a deeper personality. He sends the gang to space in the final season and in the episode "The Ice Tape", Pops and the gang find out that Mr. Maellard is not his real father and he found him as a baby, adopted him during an expedition, and kept him safe until the time was right for Pops to fulfill his destiny, but Mr. Maellard tells Pops that no matter what, he always thought of him and loved him unconditionally as his real son. In the series finale, when the park gang returns from space after a three-year absence, Mordecai notices Mr. Maellard staring up at the sky in grief, shedding a tear for his late son. It is presumed that he is caretaken by Benson for the remaining days of his life until he dies immediately before the 25th reunion of the Park, when the gang erect a statue of him next to the statue of Pops. Ogden Stiers was a voice acting veteran; this marked his final recurring voice role before his death in March 2018.

=== Audrey ===
Audrey (voiced by Courtenay Taylor) is Benson's ex-girlfriend and neighbor who appears in "Weekend at Benson's", "Fortune Cookie", "The Christmas Special", and "Party Re-Pete". It is revealed in "The Real Thomas" that they broke up.

=== Baby Ducks/Hyperduck ===
The Baby Ducks (voiced by J. G. Quintel, William Salyers, Sam Marin, Mark Hamill, and Roger Craig Smith) are a group of four baby ducks whom Mordecai and Rigby found in a fountain in the park in the episode "A Bunch of Baby Ducks". They have shown their ability to fuse together to form a giant duck-headed man called Hyperduck when they fist-pump simultaneously. They return in the episode "A Bunch of Full-Grown Geese" to help Mordecai and Rigby get rid of the park by the evil, titular geese who soon turn into a similar giant monster. The duo helped the baby ducks upgrade their giant form and succeeded in defeating the geese. They also appeared in "Exit 9B" where they helped fight the park worker's past villains in their giant form. Before their official debut, an unrelated group of baby ducks are some of the things sent to the moon by Rigby in the episode "The Power". In "Brilliant Century Duck Special", they again help the park gang fight the geese, who are now helping businessmen that are attempting to destroy the park. In the series finale, they help the Park gang fight Anti-Pops and Streaming.

=== Guardians of Eternal Youth ===
The Guardians of Eternal Youth (voiced by David Kaye, Robin Atkin Downes, Roger L. Jackson, J. G. Quintel, and Troy Baker) are a group of five infant-like beings for whom Skips must perform a ceremonial dance to maintain his immortality otherwise, he will be stripped of his eternal life. Skips also attended school with them before they granted him his immortality. They also designed and built Skips' Fists of Justice, which allowed him to defeat Klorgbane the Destroyer. Mordecai and Rigby found out about this and because they accidentally injured Skips, they took over and defeated Klorgbane (but not before he killed Archibald, one of the guardians), who vowed to return before he was sent flying away. They also appeared in "Exit 9B", where they help the park workers fight off their past villains. In the episode "Quips", the leader's name is revealed to be Reginald, and in "Skips' Story", the names of the other three guardians are revealed to be Oswald, Boswald, and Griswald. In Regular Show: The Movie, they participate in the fight against Mr. Ross and his timenado. In the final season finale, they help the park gang fight Anti-Pops and Streaming.

=== Gary ===
Gareth "Gary" (voiced by Robin Atkin Downes) is the King of Synthos who went to school with Skips and the Guardians of Eternal Youth. He works as a valet for the Guardians and also made an appearance in the episode "Cool Bikes" where he served as Mordecai and Rigby's lawyer. In "Gary's Synthesizer" it is revealed that he has an old synthesizer that keeps him alive, but if any of its cables come unplugged or are tampered with, he will disappear. Although king of his home planet Synthos, he left to travel the galaxy and his half-brother David took over. When Gary found out how strict David was as king of Synthos, he battled him in a music battle and won. David was destroyed in the sun and his disk was smashed by two Synthos people, Robert and Keith, who were nearly executed by David. Then Gary declared that from then on Synthos would have no ruler. In the final season finale, he helps the park gang fight Anti-Pops and Streaming.

=== Death ===
Death (voiced by Julian Holloway in a cockney accent) is the grim reaper who, in several of his appearances, makes bets with park workers and declares that he would take their souls if they lose. For example, he tried to take the immortal life of Skips during his first appearance in the episode "Over The Top". He also tried to take Muscle Man's soul twice in the episodes "Dead at Eight" and "Last Meal" and even attempted to take everyone's souls in "Skips Strikes". Despite these evil intentions, he also helped the groundskeepers defeat the villains resurrected by GBF Jr. in the episode "Exit 9B". Death also has a son named Thomas, a 300-year-old demon (voiced by Michael Dorn and later Michael-Leon Wooley in The Lost Tapes) who can speak, although Death does not know this. He later helped them retrieve Mr. Maellard's guitar in "Guitar of Rock", and in "The End of Muscle Man" where the others think he's trying to take Muscle Man's soul, but was only there to deliver him a ring. He also makes an appearance in the episode "Cheer Up Pops" after the gang invites him to a party to help them cheer Pops up. In this episode, he said that they could count on him to help in the final battle. In the series finale, he helps the park gang fight Anti-Pops and Streaming.

=== Don ===
Don
- Regular Show character
- First appearance: "Don" (2010)
- Last appearance: "A Regular Epic Final Battle: The Power" (2017) (non-speaking cameo)
- Created by: J. G. Quintel; Benton Connor; Kat Morris
- Designed by: J. G. Quintel
- Voiced by: Julian Dean

In-universe information
- Species: Raccoon
- Gender: Male
- Occupation: Accountant
- Family: Sherm (father); Barbara (mother); Rigby (older brother)
- Home: Don's house (formerly); Rigby's house (currently)
- Nationality: American

Don (voiced by Julian Dean) is Rigby's younger brother. Introduced in the episode "Don," Don is more mature and likeable than Rigby in most ways, even though in reality he was trying to be as cool as his elder brother, which unknowingly sparks his jealousy. Don is also significantly taller than Rigby and loves to give hugs to other people. Don expresses this by asking his comrades for "sugar," which is customarily his catchphrase. At the end of the episode, Rigby and Don make amends. Don returned in the episode "Bank Shot", where he helped Rigby practice for a bet he made with someone. Don makes a final appearance in the finale where he and his parents greet Rigby home after three years.

=== Low-Five Ghost ===
Low-Five Ghost (voiced by Roger Craig Smith) is Hi Five Ghost's brother, who works as a police officer. It was revealed that he once served a sentence in prison until his brother Hi Five and Muscle Man bailed him out in "See You There". He also appeared in "The Postcard" to help his brother decipher the words from a busted up postcard to determine where Hi Five promised to meet a girl named Celia many years ago. He later appeared to help Mordecai, Rigby, Hi Five Ghost & Muscle Man get a car so they can get burritos with all kinds of meat.

=== God of Basketball ===
The God of Basketball (voiced by Carl Weathers) is a basketball/human hybrid who is also known as the Basketball Coach King. He apparently lives within the moon and rides in a custom designed white flying Cadillac Escalade. The God of Basketball then quickly befriends Mordecai and Rigby in "Slam Dunk" which leads him into offering them to learn how to play basketball well. When that does not go according to plan, he uses his powers to instantly grant both of them great basketball powers. The God of Basketball momentarily changes sides when he is forced to play with Muscle Man against the duo for computer rights for life. The God of Basketball also appeared when he helped Rigby to get back his hat, in the match of Rigby vs. a basketball net face-like weirdo in 'Bank Shot'. The God of Basketball later appears in "Exit 9B" as a protagonist Skips summons to help save The Park.

=== Techmo/Sampson ===
Techmo (voiced by Steven Blum) was once a human named Sampson until he became a technomancer cyborg. He first appeared in "Skips vs. Technology" to help Mordecai, Rigby, and Skips solve a computer error named Error 220 (little did Mordecai, Rigby and Skips know error 220 was a virus known as "Doom Ma Geddon"). Techmo eventually became possessed by Doom Ma Geddon, but the trio were able to defeat the virus and free Techmo by destroying the computer. In "Exit 9B", Techmo is among the characters that are summoned by Skips to help fight the resurrected villains. He also appears in "A Skips in Time", where he helps the past Skips return to his time to save the present Skips from dying. In Regular Show: The Movie, he participates in the fight against Mr. Ross and his timenado. He makes his final appearance in the finale to greet Skips.

=== The Phone Guardians ===
The Phone Guardians (voiced by Rich Fulcher and William Salyers) are five living objects (a fire in a wigwam, two tin cans connected by a string, an answering machine, a message in a bottle, and a chalkboard) who serve as protectors of phones and live in an empty universe. All members appear to lack the ability to understand emotion. They first appeared in "Butt Dial" where they threaten to erase Mordecai and Rigby from existence for hacking into Margaret's phone to erase an embarrassing message that Mordecai accidentally recorded, in which they chose to play it for Margaret at her request instead of erasing it for Mordecai. After listening to it, Margaret convinces them to release Mordecai and Rigby while saying that they've "learned their lesson." They also appeared in "I Like You Hi" where they help Mordecai admit his feelings to CJ. They are a reference of the C.O.P.S (Computer Obsolescence Prevention Society) from the Sam And Max series.

=== Dr. Henry ===
Dr. Henry (voiced by Armin Shimerman) is a lollipop man who serves as the park doctor. He first appeared in "Cool Cubed", where he told Mordecai and Rigby to go into Thomas' brain. Later in "Catching the Wave", he told Pops to try and stay away from surfing or else his big head would put too much strain on his neck. He later appears in "The End of Muscle Man" where he advises Muscle Man if he is in good condition to do his last activities as a bachelor.

=== RGB2 ===
RGB2 (voiced by Sam Marin) is a TV robot controlled by an old man from the inside. He first appeared in "That's My Television" where Mordecai and Rigby help him escape from the studio. He was the star of the sitcom, That's My Television. He is briefly seen in "The Thanksgiving Special" as a cook.

His name references R2-D2 from the Star Wars cinematic franchise, as well as the RGB color standard.

=== The Sensei ===
The Sensei (voiced by Sam Marin) is a red-haired, overachieving and obese man who used to teach Death-Kwon-Do. After Mordecai and Rigby stole his moves in "Death Punchies", he was forced to shut his dojo down. He re-appears in "Sandwich of Death" as the owner of Death-Kwon-Do Dojo Pizza and Subs and helps them retrieve the cure for Benson, who ate the Death Sandwich incorrectly. It is revealed that he had a falling out with his master, who tried to kill him when they tried to retrieve the cure. He returns in "Death Kwon Do-Livery," where Mordecai, Rigby, and his apprentice attempt to help him go through a surgery operation for his new stomach. The reason is that his stomach exploded due to his Death Kwon Do Sandwich of Health, which is incredibly unhealthy. His apprentice later turns on them due to how his master had treated him, and that he had snuck in after working hours to eat it and thus he needs a replacement stomach. Despite his attempts to steal the stomach, the duo stop him and manage to save the sensei.

=== Doctor Reuben Langer ===
Doctor Reuben Langer (voiced by Troy Baker) was the new leader of the Dome project who first appeared in "The Button." After Mordecai, Rigby, and the gang defeated the original leader, Doctor Dome, Langer was sent in his place to continue the Dome project. He told the gang not to push the button yet, as it was hinted that Langer and his crew were working on the rockets for The Park. In the episode "Rigby's Graduation Day Special," he sent a fax to the gang to push the button to launch them into space for their mission: protect and train Pops against his long-lost evil brother, Anti-Pops.

=== Chance Sureshot ===
Chance Sureshot (voiced by Matthew Mercer) was one of Rawls' men working at the space station. Alongside Toothpick Sally and Recap Robot, he helps save the park from the Reaper Bots. His first appearance was in "Cool Bro Bots." He was killed when he tried to stop Anti-Pops from killing Pops and the gang with a laser in "Space Escape." He makes his final appearance in the finale where he helps the park gang fight Anti-Pops and Streaming. It is also revealed that Chance Sureshot has made multiple clones of himself whenever he dies in the finale.

=== Toothpick Sally ===
Toothpick Sally (voiced by Vanessa Marshall) is another one of Rawls' personnel, working alongside Chance Sureshot and Recap Robot. In the episode "The Space Race" Sally helps Mordecai and Rigby prepare for an annual race called the Interstation 5000 after the duo beat the high score for a spaceship simulator. She helps the gang fight Anti-Pops and Streaming in the finale.

=== Recap Robot ===
Recap Robot (voiced by Matthew Mercer) is a green robot usually seen with Sureshot and Sally, working at the Space Tree. He appears in the finale alongside Sureshot and Sally, participating in the battle against Anti-Pops and Streaming.

=== Colonel Rawls ===
Colonel Rawls (voiced by D. C. Douglas) is the leader of the Space Tree who first appeared in "Welcome to Space". After the Park gang was sent into space, Rawls ordered Sureshot and his Crew to find the gang. When the Gang arrived at the Space Tree, Rawls told them why Maellard and Langer sent them into space for a special mission. In the episode "Space Escape", Mordecai and Rigby told Rawls that Anti-Pops erased an employee from Comet Stop. Rawls ordered everyone to get out of the Space Tree and he managed to get Mordecai, Rigby, and the gang out of the hangar but he decided to stay at the Space Tree.

=== Earl ===
Earl (voiced by Feodor Chin) is the master of Pops who first appeared in "The Ice Tape". After Maellard revealed to Pops the truth about his origin, he tells him to find Earl since he's the one who can help Pops to fight his evil brother. After the tape melted, Earl revealed himself to the Gang. Later, in the episode "The Key to the Universe", Earl tests Pops by making him do his chores, which lead to Pops unleashing his frustration on him. Earl understands Pops and in a last effort of persuasion to continue training, he shows him a fragment from a previous Universe and also showed him the decision of Pops not fighting his Brother. Upon this revelation, Pops later ran away and hid from everyone but Mordecai and Rigby calmed him down. After Pops was fully relaxed, Earl threw a lemon towards him which activates his powers and soon declares that his real training will begin. During the episode "No Train No Gain", Earl senses the growing threat of Anti-Pops' powers, so he used a training montage with some of his favorite music to train Pops quickly. This however made Mordecai and Rigby bored with his music, and they used their own music to speed up Pops's own training. Earl was shocked and told them that Pops goes too fast and out of control. The gang and Earl was able to stop Pops speeding, but ended up benefiting Pops' strength and Earl realizes he's ready. In "Kill'Em with Kindness", he is erased by Anti-Pops. In the final season finale, when both Pops and Anti-Pops died together and restoring everything in the universe that has been destroyed by their cause in balance, meaning that Earl is revived.

=== The Seer ===
The Seer (voiced by Yvette Nicole Brown) is the all-knowing person who first appeared in "Meet the Seer". She was mentioned by Earl in "Kill'em with Kindness", that she was the only one that will reveal the location of the final battle. She later meets the park gang in "Meet the Seer" and tells them that she knows all of their personalities before arriving on Planet Nielsen. After Reel to Reel and Black and White were killed by Streaming, she would later reveal the location of the final battle to Pops and the gang. She was killed when Planet Nielsen exploded, but when Pops and Anti-Pops died, she was revived.

=== Father Time ===
Father Time (voiced by Alan Sklar in "It's Time" and Fred Tatasciore in Regular Show: The Movie) is a large being made of clocks who wears a purple bowler's hat. He lives within an invisible house in the space-time continuum. In the episode "It's Time" Mordecai accidentally traveled to his dimension when he tried to destroy several clocks using a microwave oven out of jealousy due to Rigby asking out Margaret before he could, unwittingly killing Rigby in the process. Father Time got upset with Mordecai because of his jealousy and attempting to destroy his clocks. Although Mordecai initially had to stay in his dimension for the rest of his life as punishment, he instead sends him back in time to the beginning of the episode on a "time pony" (as house guests annoy him since they can't see his invisible furniture) after accepting Mordecai's apology, but warns him that there will be consequences if he ever does this again. He also appears in Regular Show: The Movie where he convinces Rigby to apologize to Mordecai and restore their friendship. He is also deteriorating due to Mr. Ross' usage of the time-nado, but after his defeat, he is presumably restored.

=== Archie the Archivist/Laserdisc Guardian ===
Archie (voiced by John Cygan) is a librarian, DVD/HD-DVD and Blu-Ray's father, and the protector of the remaining laserdisc player who can transform into the Laserdisc Guardian in the form of a golden crystal being. While in this form, he speaks in a language that only the Guardians of Obsolete Formats, DVD/HD-DVD, and Blu-Ray can understand. He first appears in "The Last Laserdisc Player". Mordecai, Rigby, Muscle Man, and Hi Five Ghost came to his library to rent a laserdisc player, but he points out that they're all out and takes them to the basement to prove it. When they show him the laserdisc record that they found, he reveals that they are the Disc Masters and uses that record to open the door to a secret room where the last laserdisc player and the Guardians of Obsolete Format are in and entrusts the laserdisc player to them. During the fight against the Ancient Order of the VHS, he gets injured by the VC-Arbitrator and the Disc Masters transform him to his true form, who then defeats the VHS men and the VC-Arbitrator. He is then seen watching a movie on the laserdisc player with the Disc Masters and the Guardians. He also appears in "Format Wars II" where he again helps the Disc Masters find the universal remote, which reveals that Benson is the fifth Disc Master and joins the fight against his son, DVD and his creation: Internet. When he and DVD try to reconcile, Internet betrays DVD and kills Archie. He reappears as a ghost at the end of the episode, once again watching a movie with everyone else. He is mentioned in "Meet the Seer" while DVD (now upgraded to HD-DVD) and Blu-Ray are arguing over who is better.

=== DVD/HD-DVD ===
DVD (voiced by Joel McHale as DVD and Trevor Devall as HD-DVD) is Archie's son and Blu-Ray's older brother who first appears in "Format Wars II". Although he at first starts off as a villain, he later reforms. Like Archie, he can transform into a crystal being but unlike his father, his form's color is silver and his face is displayed, therefore allowing him to speak English in his crystal form. Like the Guardians of Obsolete Formats, he can also understand what Archie is saying while he's in his crystal form. He creates a Wi-Fi Robot named Internet to seek revenge against his father for discrediting his format. During the fight against the Guardians, the Disc Masters (Mordecai, Rigby, Muscle Man, Hi Five Ghost, and Benson), and Archie, they are able to kill Betamax, Ampex Quadruplex, and Floppy Disc, but when he and Archie try to reconcile, Internet betrays him and kills his father, to the former's horror and anger. Now seeing that he can no longer control Internet, DVD then decided to help the Disc Masters defeat Internet by providing them the universal remote's code to take out the Wi-Fi server tower that's powering him. Following the battle, he is seen watching a movie along with the Disc Masters, Reel-to-Reel, and Archie's ghost. He meets them again in "Meet the Seer" alongside his sister Blu-Ray where he is now upgraded to HD-DVD and helps them fight through Planet Nielsen against Streaming (who is Internet upgraded in a new form) and his minions to find the Seer and they escape before the planet's destruction. In "Cheer up Pops" they help the park gang record the memories of their past adventures so they can always remember them. In the eighth-season finale, they participate in the battle against Anti-Pops and Streaming.

=== Blu-Ray ===
Blu-Ray (voiced by Gillian Jacobs) is Archie's daughter and DVD/HD-DVD's sister who first appears in "Meet the Seer" where she and HD-DVD help the park gang fight through Planet Nielsen against Streaming (who is Internet upgraded into a new form) and his minions to find the Seer and they escape before the planet's destruction. Like Archie and DVD/HD-DVD, she can transform into a crystal being (which is colored blue) and like her brother, can speak English in this form as her face is displayed. She can also understand Archie's speech in his crystal form. In "Cheer up Pops" they help the park gang record the memories of their past adventures so they can always remember them. In the eighth-season finale, they participate in the battle against Anti-Pops and Streaming.

=== Guardians of Obsolete Formats ===
The Guardians of Obsolete Formats are seven giant beings with heads resembling outdated machines. Four of them first appeared in "The Last Laserdisc Player" where they are awakened by the Disc Masters (Mordecai, Rigby, Muscle Man, and Hi Five Ghost) to protect the remaining laserdisc player. During the fight against the Ancient Order of the VHS, the guardian 8-Track is killed by the VC-Arbitrator. They (along with two others) return in "Format Wars II" where they help the Disc Masters find the universal remote (which also reveals that Benson is the fifth Disc Master) after finding out that the guardian Microfiche is killed by DVD. In the fight against DVD and Internet, Betamax, Floppy Disc, Ampex Quadruplex, ENIAC, and Archie are killed. The remaining two guardians: Reel-to Reel and Black and White meet them again in "Meet the Seer" where they help the park gang fight through Planet Nielsen with the help of DVD (who is now upgraded to HD-DVD), Blu-Ray, and Microwave (who sacrifices himself to save the others) until they are both killed by Streaming (who is Internet upgraded into a new form).

==== Betamax ====
Sony Betamax VCR (voiced by David Kaye) is one of the Guardians of Obsolete Formats whose head resembles a Sony Betamax VCR. He is killed by DVD.

==== 8-Track ====
Lear 8-Track Recorder (voiced by John Cygan) is one of the Guardians of Obsolete Formats whose head resembles a Lear 8-Track recorder. He is killed by the VC-Arbitrator.

==== Floppy Disc ====
IBM Floppy Disc Drive (voiced by Richard McGonagle) is one of the Guardians of Obsolete Formats whose head resembles an IBM floppy disc drive. He is killed by DVD.

==== Reel-to-Reel ====
CinemaScope Reel-to-Reel Projector (voiced by Richard McGonagle) is one of the Guardians of Obsolete Formats whose head resembles a CinemaScope reel-to-reel projector. He is killed by Streaming.

==== Black and White ====
Black and White TV (voiced by Fred Tatasciore) is one of the Guardians of Obsolete Formats whose head resembles a black and white TV. He is killed by Streaming.

==== Ampex Quadruplex ====
Ampex Quadruplex VTR (voiced by William Salyers) is one of the Guardians of Obsolete Formats whose head resembles an Ampex quadruplex VTR. He is killed by DVD.

==== Microfiche ====
NCR Microfiche Reader (voiced by David Kaye) is one of the Guardians of Obsolete Formats whose head resembles an NCR microfiche reader. He is killed by DVD.

==== ENIAC ====
ENIAC (voiced by David Kaye) is the first computer that was ever made and an ally of the Guardians of Obsolete Formats. He is accidentally killed before the fight against DVD and Internet.

==== Microwave ====
Microwave (voiced by Fred Tatasciore) is a doctor microwave oven who works on Planet Neilsen and is a close friend of the Guardians of Obsolete Formats. He sacrifices himself to help the park gang escape.

=== White Elephant ===
The White Elephant (voiced by Fred Tatasciore) is an anthropomorphic white elephant and guardian of the White Elephant Gift Exchange ceremony who appears in "White Elephant Gift Exchange". When the park gang attempts to pay Muscle Man back for his past pranks, they are teleported to the White Elephant's temple. He is unhappy with the park gang for wanting to get revenge on Muscle Man and violating the rules of the White Elephant Gift Exchange; which is to give gifts you don't like, not receive gifts you like, which makes it entertaining (since Muscle Man's pranks are his way of having a fun time). Because of this, they must stay in his temple for all eternity for going overboard with their revenge prank and are not allowed to open any of the gifts here. However, he does give them two options: go back and make amends, or open the gift box that he offers them. They choose to go back, but decide to carry out their revenge prank anyway when they find out that Muscle Man had pranked Rigby with what they thought was a new flatscreen TV, but was actually a box of old Chinese food. At the end of the episode, the White Elephant watches through the snow globe in the gift box that he offered to the park gang earlier, who then winks at the audience and leaves. This implies that he may have been aware of Muscle Man's prank and orchestrated the whole thing to ensure that the park gang's payback prank succeeds.

=== Johnny Crasher ===
Johnny Crasher (voiced by Bobcat Goldthwait) is a stuntman and teacher who appeared in "The Heart of a Stuntman". When Mordecai, Rigby, Muscle Man and Hi Five Ghost went to the stunt class, they meet him. He teaches them how to stunt, then he challenges and completes the stunt challenge to go to Timmy's birthday. He appears in an online game "Daredevil Danger", as the master of the stunt class.

=== Guardian of Lolliland ===
The Guardian of Lolliland (voiced by Christine Baranski) is a giant living statue who appears in the eighth-season finale. She helps the park gang fight Anti-Pops and Streaming, even though she isn't supposed to take part in the battle.

=== Carter and Briggs ===
Carter (voiced by Steven Blum) and Briggs (voiced by Roger Craig Smith) are two movie stars who play as cops. In their first appearance, they arrange a donut contest and the winner will get to be on their next show. Mordecai and Rigby manage to win the contest after facing against two persistent competitors in a deadly void. They made cameo appearances in a few episodes. In "Brilliant Century Duck Special", they help the park gang and the Baby Ducks fight the geese, who are working for businessmen that are trying to tear down the park. In the eighth-season finale, they help the park gang fight Anti-Pops and Streaming.

=== Pam ===
Pam (voiced by Ali Hillis) is one of the dome workers that Benson falls in love with during the dome experiment. It didn't seem like she was interested but it is revealed she reciprocated this and they went out on a couple of dates. When the park got sent into space, she considered ending their relationship since she couldn't handle a long-distance relationship. After the park returns, they got back together and presumably got married in the years to come.

=== Applesauce ===
Applesauce (voiced by Jeff Bennett) is Benson's pet pig who appeared in "Benson's Pig". His real name is later revealed to be Leroy with a tattoo on it right arm, it is also revealed that he used to work with his partner Harry Roughauser, who also has tattoo on the left that forms a skull when they put their arms together. Leroy was the brain and Harry was the brawn of the team until he left him when he told him he was a loose canon but decided to come back to rescue his partner from jail after getting his partners call. When that escape plan was succeeded, Harry tried to convince Leroy to leave and commit crimes again but he refuses saying he wants to stay as Benson's pet pig and agrees. He later returns in the season eight finale where's he is the only character who greets Benson after three years.

=== Del Hanlon ===
Del Hanlon (voiced by Rich Sommer) is Margaret's fake boyfriend and Chopper 6 Weekend Sports TV Anchor who first appeared in "1000th Chopper Flight Party".

=== Party Horse 42699 ===
Party Horse 42699 (voiced by Adam Pally) is an extraterrestrial horse who lives to party. After escaping to Earth to avoid a test and befriending Mordecai and Rigby, he slacks off with them until his principal arrives and threatens to destroy the Earth if he doesn't pass the test; however, Party Horse instead tricks him into stopping Earth's destruction. He later returns to Earth to get the duo's help to get back with his girlfriend. In the eighth-season finale, he helps the park gang fight Anti-Pops and Streaming.

=== Lemon Chef ===
The Lemon Chef is a video game character with a lemon for a head. He appears in "Just Set Up the Chairs", where he is summoned by Mordecai, Rigby, and Skips to fight the Destroyer of Worlds. He returns in "Exit 9B" where he again fights the revived Destroyer of Worlds and wins.

=== Guardian of the Friend Zone ===
The Guardian of the Friend Zone (voiced by Wayne Knight) is a talking asteroid who appears in "Meteor Moves". He became like this in the first place because he lost his chances with his previous girlfriends. He traps Mordecai and Margaret in the Friend Zone because of Mordecai missing many opportunities to kiss Margaret due to him constantly doubting himself and did not want to see Mordecai end up the same way that he did. Afterwards, he helps convince Mordecai to finally kiss Margaret and he gives him another chance.

== Villains ==
=== Anti-Pops/Malum Kranus ===
Malum Kranus
- Regular Show character
- First appearance: "The Dream Warrior" (2016) (cameo)
- Last appearance: "Regular Show: The Lost Tapes: Fix That Tape" (2026)
- Created by: Madeline Queripel; Alex Cline
- Designed by: Madeline Queripel
- Voiced by: Robert Englund

In-universe information
- Nickname: Anti-Pops
- Species: Lollipop
- Gender: Male
- Family: Pops (brother ; deceased)
- Home: Lolliland (formerly); Anti-Pops' Ship (formerly)
- Nationality: American

Anti-Pops (voiced by Robert Englund) is the evil and powerful brother of Pops with the ability to erase a person or anything from existence. He was first introduced in the Season 8 episode "The Dream Warrior", where he sent a nightmare alien to go inside Pops' dream and question him about his location. In "The Ice Tape" it is revealed that he is in fact the evil twin brother of Pops and that he must kill him to ensure the destruction of the universe. In the episode "Kill 'Em with Kindness" Pops tries to settles things peacefully with him but fails as he shows no mercy towards Pops. After he follows them to Pops' home planet, and engages Pops in an epic battle while his henchmen fight the park gang. Pops attempts to ends thing peacefully, but with little success. Streaming (who still has a score to settle with the Disc Masters) also arrives to aid him in the fight against Pops and the park workers. In the end, the brothers are killed when Pops sacrifices himself by flying them both into the sun, with Anti-Pops showing some form of remorse for his past actions before his death.

=== Garrett Bobby Ferguson ===
Garrett Bobby Ferguson
- First appearance: "High Score" (2011)
- Last appearance: "Can you Ear Me Now?" (2016) (cameo)
- Voiced by: Sam Marin

In-universe information
- Species: Giant Floating Face
- Gender: Male
- Occupation: Gamer
- Children: Garrett Bobby Ferguson Jr. (deceased)
- Home: Unknown

Garrett Bobby Ferguson Sr. (GBF Sr.) (voiced by Sam Marin) is a giant floating head from outer space who is based on the video gamer Billy Mitchell. He first appeared in the episode "High Score" and at one point was the universal record holder for an arcade game called "Broken Bonez" before exploded in a fit of rage when Mordecai and Rigby beat his high score. He is basically one of Mordecai and Rigby's most formidable enemies and really hates them. He is a very good liar, as seen in "High Score", saying that he devoted his life to the game "Broken Bonez" and that he played it too much his wife left him, but when Mordecai and Rigby intentionally lose the game so GBF can win, he says, "Thank you. Ha, ha, ha. Thank you for being so dumb", revealing that he didn't devote his whole life to the game, saying that it was just a hobby and he never had a wife. Mordecai and Rigby along with a crowd of people make him lose by chanting the words "broken bones", and he gives in. The game kept going and GBF desperately tried to sabotage them by trying to get them away from the game, but fails and has his fit of rage. His head blows up, with brain goo coming out. Contrary to his statement about not having a wife, it was revealed in the episode "Exit 9B" that he had a son who attempted to bring back his father along with other deceased villains to have their revenge, yet the park workers and their allies managed to send Garrett Bobby Ferguson and the other villains back into the afterlife, taking his son with him. GBF makes a cameo as a pixelated sprite in "Expert or Liar" after Rigby makes it to the final question in the game show Expert or Liar. When Rigby wins the show, he punches the show's host, Bert Coleman, into the GBF clone's mouth, which kills the host after the GBF clone explodes. GBF appears in the online game "Dimensional Drift", once again as the main villain.

==== Libel suit ====
A lawsuit was filed against Cartoon Network by Billy Mitchell over GBF in 2015. Mitchell considered the GBF character from Regular Show as a libel against himself as the character resembles Mitchell and is depicted as someone who cheats at video games. The suit was ultimately thrown out of court by United States District Court for the District of New Jersey Judge Anne Elise Thompson who stated that "the television character does not match the plaintiff in appearance". In 2017, an investigation over some of Mitchell's records found that he did, in fact, cheat at video games, with those records invalidated by the video game record keepers Twin Galaxies.

=== Gene ===
Gene
- Regular Show character
- First appearance: "Prankless" (2012)
- Last appearance: "Chilli Cook Off" (2016)
- Created by: Benton Connor; Hilary Florido
- Designed by: Hilary Florido
- Voiced by: Kurtwood Smith

In-universe information
- Species: Vending Machine
- Gender: Male
- Occupation: Park manager; Cook; Prankster
- Spouse: Unknown wife
- Children: Unknown son
- Nationality: American

Gene (voiced by Kurtwood Smith) is Benson's rival who appears to be a green vending machine. He is in charge of a nearby park named East Pines. Gene's first appearance is in the episode "Prankless", which details two separate prank wars to destroy Benson's park for reasons never explained, both of which were thwarted by Muscle Man. He makes a reappearance in the half-hour special "The Christmas Special", but as a protagonist, helping Benson out willingly due to his own love of the holiday of Christmas and it is also revealed that he has a family. He also makes a cameo appearance in the episode "Dodge This", in which he and his workers are a team and compete against Benson's dodgeball team ("Benson's Ballers"). He made another appearance in "Thomas Fights Back" where he steals the park's statue, but the park gang managed to take back the statue with Thomas' help. Gene makes additional appearances in the episodes "Park Managers Lunch", "The Parkie Awards", and "Chili Cook-Off".

=== Susan ===
Susan (voiced by April Stewart) was a park manager who appeared in "Benson Be Gone". She replaces Benson after being fired by Mr. Maellard, but is later revealed to be a demon. When she got angry at the employees, she turned into a giant and was killed by a hobo named Leon who was a former park manager. She returns in "Exit 9B" as one of the many villains that GBF Jr. revives, but only appears as her giant counterpart and fought against the baby ducks in their giant form. Susan is defeated by the duck giant in their encounter.

=== Chong ===
Chong (voiced by Sam Marin) is the antagonist in "Stick Hockey". He is Benson's nemesis since he chopped the head of Benson's apprentice, Dave, ten years ago. Whenever somebody lost to him, he would chop off their heads or other body parts. In the end, he lost to Benson. He later makes a cameo in "The Thanksgiving Special". Chong also appears in an online game "Fist Punch 2" as the boss.

=== Capicola Gang ===
The Capicola Gang is a trio of evil anthropomorphic animatronic animals from The Fun Fun Zone, a place that became corrupted after the Park workers won a pair of fuzzy dice (which, unknown to them, had uncut diamonds in them) for Pops' birthday in the episode "Fuzzy Dice". The Capicola gang attempted to escape with the dice after they took them from the park workers, which leads to a car chase to the harbor. After Louie exposes their crime (to the Main Bear's annoyance), they attempted to kill them to take back the dice only for them to be destroyed by the FBI. It took a lot of firepower to bring them down. They reappear in the episode "Steak Me Amadeus", in which it is revealed that they survived the confrontation and plotted revenge on the park workers for foiling their evil crime and sold fake Amadeus Dollars to Pops, which Mordecai used to pay for a date with Margaret at the titular restaurant. They appear at the same restaurant and are confronted by the park gang and two FBI agents for selling the fake Amadeus Dollars, beginning a gun battle between them against the groundskeepers and the agents (which they temporarily stop to let a tearful Margaret pass through) until Amadeus Martinez, the restaurant's owner, shoots a bazooka at them, finally destroying them for good. They share a resemblance to the characters from the popular game series Five Nights at Freddy's and the popular kids entertainment center Chuck E. Cheese.

==== Main Bear ====
The Main Bear (voiced by John Cygan) is a robot bear who is the leader of the Capicola Gang. He was severely damaged after the FBI shot him down after a lot of firepower. He was destroyed by Amadeus in "Steak Me Amadeus" with a bazooka after he insults college education.

==== Louie ====
Louie (voiced by Mark Hamill) is a robot beaver who is a member of the Capicola Gang. He is shown to be very dimwitted, and acts without thinking (as shown when he tells the Park members about the diamonds in the Fuzzy Dice). He was destroyed by Amadeus in "Steak Me Amadeus" with a bazooka.

==== Duck ====
Duck (voiced by Dawnn Lewis) is a robot duck who is a member of the Capicola Gang. She was destroyed by Amadeus in "Steak Me Amadeus" with a bazooka.

=== Klorgbane the Destroyer ===
Klorgbane the Destroyer
- First appearance: "Fists of Justice" (2012)
- Last appearance: "Skips' Story" (2014)
- Voiced by: Troy Baker

In-universe information
- Species: Magic baby Demonian
- Gender: Male
- Occupation: Destroyer

Klorgbane the Destroyer (voiced by Troy Baker) is Skips' main rival who has appeared in "Fists of Justice" and later "Skips' Story" in a memory of Skips which happened chronologically before "Fists of Justice". He went to school with Skips (under his name Walks) and was the Guardians of Eternal Youth's evil brother. When Walks decided to defeat him, the Guardians and Gary made the Fists of Justice, immortal gauntlets powerful enough to defeat Klorgbane. In their first fight, Klorgbane killed Mona, Walks' girlfriend. He returned in "Fists of Justice" and was defeated by Mordecai and Rigby because Skips was injured. During the fight, one of the guardians, Archibald, was killed. Klorgbane also appears as a boss and enemy of the online games "Cupcakes of Doom", "Dance of Doom", and "Fist Punch 2".

=== Death Bear ===
The Death Bear is a bear who wears a pickelhaube and a red cape around his neck. He is the villain in the episode "Death Bear." 15 to 20 years prior of the episode, he was a regular bear living in the Park Zoo. One day, he attacked and killed his trainer. The zoo was forced to close down, but Death Bear would not leave. He roamed around the zoo, growing more evil over the years, and surviving by breaking into people's homes and eating them and their food. After Mordecai, Rigby, Margaret, and Eileen encounter him, he chases them back to the house where they call Animal Control to help subdue him. Despite overwhelming the soldiers, he was eventually tranquilized by Mordecai and taken away at the end of the episode. Death Bear may be a homage to the Bald Headed Killer Bear from the 1988 movie The Great Outdoors. Death Bear also appears in an online game "Fist Punch 2" as an enemy.

=== Rich Steve ===
Rich Steve (voiced by Travis Willingham) is a greedy, selfish, arrogant and wealthy evil businessman who wants everything he wants by taking them forcefully, and is the main villain of "Benson's Suit". He came to a tailor's suit shop for a deal of the combat suit they need in exchange of above $10. Apparently, Rich tricked the tailor because he didn't promised to pay the suit maker above $10, thus the tailor refused to give the suit until he had a money above $10. However, Rich forcefully takes the suit by sacrificing his own men to kill the tailor and commit suicide themselves, but only the suit lives and manage to escape from Rich. Sometime later, they found out that the suit is now worn by Benson and wants him to give up the suit. However, Benson refused because he had no heart to care for the suit. Even though he brought his army to kill Benson, Benson and the suit's bonds are too powerful and Rich ended up killing himself.

=== Wrassle Frassle Wrestlers ===
The Wrassle Frassle Wrestlers (voiced by Lee Reherman and William Salyers) were the villains and minor characters who first appeared in "Really Real Wrestling", consisting of Forearmageddon, Hissy Fit and The Fire Marshall.

=== Huge Head ===
Huge Head (voiced by Robin Atkin Downes) is a lollipop man like Pops, except he is younger, has stubbly hair, and has a much bigger head. He is a villain who first appears in "Really Real Wrestling". On his way to the City Arena Center, Huge Head is run over by Pops's flying car, and then Pops unintentionally steals his place for a pro-wrestling bout. For doing so, Huge Head plans to steal Pops's identity as revenge. He eventually returned in the episode "Men in Uniform" where it is revealed that he has been stalking and plotting revenge against Pops for the last four years. However his "plotting" mostly consisted of him hiding in the bushes while saying "Wait! Not yet...". Eventually he would finally get his chance to attack Pops when an Ugly Hole was formed from some hideous uniforms merging. However, when he attacked Pops, he soon realized that he was being sucked into the hole as well for being so hideous, but planned to drag Pops along with him. Luckily, he was stopped by Muscle Man who was also being sucked into the hole, but instead hit Huge Head, which sent him into the Ugly Hole. However, his head was too big and ended up getting stuck between dimensions, leaving him as a large floating head floating in midair. Fortunately for Huge Head and the park, this proved to be quite beneficial for both of them as his freaky appearance drew in much attention to the park and to Huge Head as well, who was driven to joyful tears upon finally getting the fame and attention he so dearly desired. He is seen again in the episode "The Key to the Universe", but is already dead as his head is now a skeleton and is still floating in midair.

=== Garrett Bobby Ferguson Jr. ===
Garrett Bobby Ferguson Jr.
- First appearance: "Exit 9B" (2012)
- Last appearance: "The Real Thomas: An Intern Special" (2014) (in a flashback)
- Voiced by: Roger Craig Smith

In-universe information
- Species: Giant Floating Face
- Gender: Male
- Occupation: Contractor
- Family: Garrett Bobby Ferguson (father)

Garrett Bobby Ferguson Jr. (Voiced by Roger Craig Smith) is the main villain in "Exit 9B". He is the son of video gamer Garrett Bobby Ferguson, posing as a Contractor to turn the Park into a highway for the purpose of invoking a summon spell to bring his father and dozens of other villains, most of them killed by Mordecai and Rigby, back from the afterlife. He is first seen attacking the park gang (except Mordecai and Rigby, who both escaped through a time machine) with a stun gun that brainwashes its targets. Luckily, the groundskeepers all get their memory back and reunite thanks to Mordecai and Rigby. When his henchmen capture the park workers, GBF Jr. and the resurrected villains prepare to take revenge by killing them. However, Skips summons the Guardians of Eternal Youth and other friends, who free them, and a battle begins. With the help of their allies, the park workers are able to defeat their revived enemies. After the remaining villains are sent back through portal they emerge from, GBF Jr. self-destructs in the same way his father did after being shunned by him.

=== Natalia ===
Natalia "Natalie" (voiced by Laura Bailey) is the main antagonist of "The Real Thomas" and a Russian agent like Thomas (whom she calls by his real name, Nikolai). Under the alias of a preschool teacher named Natalie, she dates Benson when her group have begun the final phase of their plan. However, to Thomas' shock, Natalia reveals their goal to destroy the park and intended to have park gang killed. But Thomas helps his friends save the park while Natalia is assumed dead after being swallowed by a whale after being knocked from the helicopter to the ocean below.

=== Jackie Carmichael ===
Jackie Carmichael (voiced by Jennifer Hale) is a lady cyborg from the future (resembling a T-1000) who disguises as a sweet young lady. She first appeared in "1000th Chopper Flight Party" when she was trying to convince Frank (Margaret's father) to place her as his best person. She later appeared in "Local News Legend" as a news woman working in Frank's news company. Her true identity was eventually revealed to Margaret, battling to see who gets a free weekly statement. Although her physical body was destroyed by a bullet, her virus continued progressing at the end of the episode. Despite this, she is not seen again in later episodes.

=== Internet/Streaming ===
Internet (voiced by Roger Craig Smith as Internet and Keith David as Streaming) is a Wi-Fi computer robot created by DVD to seek revenge against his father. After they kill Betamax, Ampex Quadruplex, and Floppy Disc, Internet betrays DVD and kills his father when they try to reconcile, deeming both Laserdisc and DVD obsolete and declaring streaming, P.C.s, laptops, and tablets to be the future. Using the universal remote, the Disc Masters were able to defeat Internet by directing everyone on the battlefield to target the Wi-Fi server tower that's powering him, shutting him down. However, Internet survives and vows to return, planning to make streaming the future. When the park gang travel to Planet Nielsen to find the Seer, they discover it is under Internet's control (who is now upgraded to Streaming and now has a more powerful form) and they fight their way through Nielsen against Streaming and his stream box bots with the help from HD-DVD, Blu-Ray, Reel-to-Reel, and Black-and-White. Although the park gang, HD-DVD, and Blu-Ray manage to escape, Reel-to-Reel and Black-and-White are killed by Streaming. In the final season finale, he and the stream box bots assist Anti-Pops and his henchmen in the fight between Pops and the park gang and upgrades himself to a more powerful form with the help of his minions, but is defeated by the combined forces of the park gang, Guardians of Eternal Youth, Party Horse, HD-DVD, Blu-ray, Baby Ducks, Carter and Briggs, Gary, Death, and the Guardian of Lolliland.

==== Stream Box Bots ====
The Stream Box Bots are robots that resemble stream boxes and are Streaming's troops. In "Meet the Seer", when the park gang travel to Planet Neilson, they encounter some of the robot, who become hostile upon recognizing the Disc Masters. They continue to attack the park gang, Reel-to-Reel, Black-and-White, HD-DVD, and Blu-ray until Streaming joins the fight. They and Streaming join Anti-Pops in the fight between Pops and the park gang where they fuse with Streaming and upgrade him to a much stronger form.

=== Bring 'Em Back Jack ===
Bring 'Em Back Jack (voiced by John Cygan) is the bounty hunter and the main antagonist in "Benson's Car". He was hired by Benson to hunt down the thieves who stole his car, unaware that Mordecai and Rigby actually took it to be repaired. After a nasty encounter with Jack, Benson learns that truth and tries to get Jack to stop. Jack, in his thirst for violence, still attempts to shoot the duo, but ends up destroying Benson's car after Benson pushes them out of the way. Furious with Jack for double-crossing him, Benson refuses to hand over the reward money and calls the cops on him, forcing Jack to escape empty handed.

=== Ancient Order of the VHS ===
The Ancient Order of the VHS is an evil organization whose goal is to destroy all laserdiscs and laserdisc players in the world to prevent them from interfering with their products. Following their reign of terror, only one laserdisc and laserdisc player survived. After discovering the remaining laserdisc, Mordecai, Rigby, Muscle Man, and Hi Five Ghost (later revealed to be the four Disc Masters) encounter SP and LP, the leaders of the VHS and try to get them to watch VHS instead of laserdisc but are ignored. They later reveal themselves to the Disc Masters, Archie, and the Guardians of Obsolete Formats after the Disc Masters have obtained the last laserdisc player. A battle begins between the Disc Masters and the Guardians against the Order for the remaining laserdisc player, with the Guardians having the upper hand until the VC-Arbitrator arrives and overpowers them, killing the guardian 8-Track in the process. The Disc Masters transform Archie into the Laserdisc Guardian who takes out the Order and the VC-Arbitrator.

==== SP and LP ====
SP and LP (voiced by Steve Blum and Richard Doyle) are the leaders of the Ancient Order of the VHS. They are killed by the Laserdisc Guardian.

==== VC-Arbitrator ====
The VC-Arbitrator (voiced by Steven Blum) is VHS player-headed robot created by the Ancient Order of the VHS to help destroy the last laserdisc player. After it kills 8-track, it is destroyed by the Laserdisc Guardian.

=== David ===
David (voiced by Troy Baker) is Gary's half brother who took over Synthos after Gary's disappearance and forbids anything challenging. After Mordecai and Rigby foolishly tamper with Gary's synthesizer, they and Skips are sent to Synthos to repair it. David, refusing to let them revive his half brother, attempts to rocket them into the sun, but they escape with the help of Gary's synthesizer. Skips holds off David long enough for Mordecai and Rigby to revive Gary, who challenges David to a battle that ends with David being flown into the sun, while his disc was destroyed by two people who hated him to prevent his reconstruction.

=== Richard Buckner ===
Richard Buckner (voiced by J. G. Quintel) is a parody of then-businessman and future U.S. President Donald Trump. Aside from being a rich businessman, he had a main purpose in life: to have Thanksgiving all by himself. In "The Thanksgiving Special", Richard wanted to win the prized turducken from the Thanksgiving Song Contest, so he entered the contest with a song he paid a lot of people to sing (although most of them weren't even musicians): "Chewing On Freedom". Just as he was about to win the turducken, to his dismay, Mordecai and Rigby came in with their own Thanksgiving song: "What Are You Thankful For?". Richard was so disappointed that their song was better than his own, so he decided to steal the turducken from them since Farmer Jimmy wouldn't let him buy it. When Mordecai and Rigby caught up to him, he revealed that he didn't want to win the turducken so he could eat it, he wanted the golden wishbone from inside it, due to the fact that it actually grants wishes. He hired thousands of people to help him with his business, but no-one ever thanked him in return because they spent time with their families. So he planned to use the golden wishbone to have Thanksgiving to himself, and receive the thanks that he always wanted. Mordecai and Rigby wouldn't let him get away with it, so there was a quarrel between the three (with help from their friends) on Richard's blimp until they are kicked out of the blimp by Richard, who didn't know they had swapped the wishbone with the spoons Rigby used for their performance. Richard realized he had been tricked, and he was killed when his blimp was destroyed after it crashed into a bridge. The duo then use the wishbone to return to the park safely.

=== The F. E. (Chuck) ===
Chuck "the F. E." (Iron Stomach) (voiced by Roger Craig Smith) was the main antagonist in "Weekend at Benson's". He is Audrey's ex-boyfriend and the creator of the Mississippi Queen, a spicy cocktail drink, which he made Benson drink.

=== Geese ===
The Geese (voiced by Fred Tatasciore and Steven Blum) are the villains in "A Bunch of Full Grown Geese". After Mordecai and Rigby unsuccessfully try to get rid of them, they call the baby ducks to help them and they fight in their giant forms. Mordecai, Rigby, and the baby ducks successfully defeat the geese, who swear revenge before their destruction. They return in "Brilliant Century Duck Crisis Special" (apparently revived somehow) where they are hired by businessmen to destroy the park for a toy company. The park gang and baby ducks engage them in a space battle. Despite help from their allies, the geese overpower them, but when they learn they are assigned to play as the bad guys (which they did not like), they turn on their bosses and help the park gang defeat the businessmen. Afterwards, the baby ducks and geese formed a truce.

=== KILITDJ3000 ===
KILITDJ3000 (voiced by Courtenay Taylor) is an evil supercomputer who controls the KILIT radio station and appears in "K.I.L.I.T. Radio". After being activated, it turns rogue and forces everyone out except Donny G, who is forced to work as a janitor. When Muscle Man tries to get the song he wrote for Starla on the radio, the computer wouldn't let him do so, as playing the tape will activate its self-destruct program. He, Mordecai, and Rigby are able to convince Donny G to help stop the computer, but it soon discovers what they are up to. Despite its attempts to stop them (wounding Donny G in the process), it is defeated when Donny G plays Muscle Man's tape and causing the radio station to explode while the trio escape (although Donny G had somehow survived it).

=== Sacred Animals ===
The Sacred Animals (voiced by Fred Tatasciore) are spirit animals who reside in a sacred ground in the mountains and appear in "Blind Trust". After Benson angers them, he, Mordecai, and Rigby are forced to run from them, relying on each other's trust until they are forced to make a risky jump from a high cliff to escape from the leader. The Sacred Animals are based on the Great Spirits from the Disney movie, Brother Bear.

==== Moose ====
Moose (voiced by Fred Tatasciore) is the leader of the sacred animals. After Benson angers him and the other sacred animals, he attempts to kill them for trespassing. The trio manage to escape from him by trusting one other and jumping from a high cliff. Impressed by how much they trust each other, he decides to let them go if they manage to survive the fall (in which they do).

=== Peeps ===
Peeps (voiced by Richard McGonagle) is a giant floating eyeball who apparently runs the surveillance company that's named after him. Benson bought his products to keep Mordecai and Rigby from slacking off, but they manage to constantly evade him, causing Benson to accidentally summon him to the park to watch over everybody and as a result, he cannot leave until they die (due to the contract that Benson signed without even reading it). After spooking everyone with his gazes, Mordecai challenges him to a staring contest in which Peeps must leave if Mordecai wins, but if Peeps wins, he will harvest their eyes. However, Peeps cheats using numerous eyes but Rigby cheats back using a laser light that causes him to lose the staring contest, setting him on fire and crashing into the lake. He is blinded in the process, and is last seen taken to the hospital.

=== Hot Dogs ===
The Hot Dogs (voiced by Tim Curry, J. G. Quintel, Sam Marin, Mark Hamill and William Salyers) are the main villains of "Meat your Maker". After Mordecai and Rigby ruin the hot dogs Benson bought for the barbecue, they encounter them in the freezer, who reveal their desire to be eaten but they soon reveal their true intentions, which is to eat the park gang and avenge their kind. After trapping everyone but Rigby in a giant plastic bag filled with barbecue sauce, they try to do the same to Rigby, but he discovers that they cannot resist eating one another when covered in mustard and uses this opportunity to vanquish them. They are among the villains revived in "Exit 9B", but only having a brief cameo.

=== The Hammer ===
The Hammer (voiced by Sam Marin) is a video game boss and the villain in "Rage Against the TV". He comes to life when the park gang are about to witness Mordecai and Rigby beat him in the video game. They proved to be no match for him until Mordecai remembers that his weakness is furniture, which they then attack him with any household object they can find until the video game comes back on and Mordecai and Rigby succeed in defeating him in the game. He is one of the villains resurrected by GBF Jr. in "Exit 9B".

=== Blonde Men ===
The blonde men (leader is voiced by Mark Hamill, the rest are voiced by William Salyers and Roger Craig Smith) are a secret cult of identical men with blonde hair, some of which wear rings that fire lasers. They are the main villains in "Bet to Be Blonde". When Mordecai and Rigby are playing video games, they make a bet that whoever loses the next game has to wear his respective game character's haircut for a week. Rigby cheats to win, but later regrets it and feels ashamed when Mordecai (wearing a blonde wig) makes friends with blonde men and joins the group, who take Rigby hostage and force him to be turned into a blonde in the end. At that point, Rigby confesses to cheating on the bet to Mordecai, who frees him. Mordecai then reveals his wig to the blondes, which prompts them to attempt to kill the two. As Mordecai and Rigby escape, Mordecai sets his ring to self-destruct before the two evacuate the building, killing the blondes in the explosion. The blonde men were among the resurrected villains in "Exit 9B"; eventually, those who survived the battle were sent back to the portal. The blondes also appear in the online game "Fist Punch", where their leader serves as a boss.

=== Destroyer of Worlds ===
The Destroyer of Worlds (voiced by Mark Hamill) is a digital devil-head villain who appears in "Just Set Up the Chairs". He is released from a video game after Mordecai and Rigby defy Skips' warning and proceeds to wreak havoc until the trio summon the Lemon Chef to combat him, which ends with the Lemon Chef winning the battle. He is one of the villains revived in "Exit 9B", in which he fights the Lemon Chef for a second time, only to be destroyed again. He appears in the online games "Just a Regular Game" and "Fist Punch 2" as an enemy and boss.

=== Zombies ===
The Zombies made their first appearance in "Grave Sights". During a movie night in a cemetery hosted by the Park, when the movie tape is knocked out by accident, Rigby obliviously puts it in backwards, damaging the tape and somehow awakening the dead from the nearby graves, who attempt to attack the audience. Using Muscle Man's sports equipment, Mordecai, Rigby, Muscle Man, Hi Five Ghost, and Skips stop the zombies. When a strong, muscular zombie named Howard "Hellion" Fightington is revived, Mordecai and Rigby kill him by driving the cart into him. Howard Fightington and the other zombies appear again in "Exit 9B", as one of the resurrected villains. They also re-appear in the online game "Nightmare-athon".

=== Carlocks ===
The Carlocks (voiced by Mark Hamill, Roger Craig Smith, William Salyers and J. G. Quintel) are the villains that appeared in "Journey to the Bottom of the Crash Pit". They are the first and last of the mighty underground race. When Mordecai, Rigby, Muscle Man and Hi Five Ghost travel to their cave in search for a video camera, they find it in possession of the Carlocks, who refuse to give it back, forcing them to steal it an escape in a worn-out car. The Carlocks give chase to try and get the camera back, but the four manage to escape the hole. Skips' truck then dumped dirt into the hole, killing them for good. The Carlocks are based on the Morlocks from H. G. Wells' novel, "The Time Machine". Their appearance is based on the Morlocks seen in the 1960 George Pal Film of the same name. The Carlocks also appear in the online game "Fist Punch 2" as enemies.

=== Were-Skunk ===
Were-Skunk
- First appearance: "Skunked" (2011)
- Voiced by: Paul F. Tompkins

In-universe information
- Species: Were-Skunk (formerly); Human (currently)
- Gender: Male
- Home: A hut in the forest

The Were-Skunk (voiced by Paul F. Tompkins) is a mythical creature (parody of werewolf) and the villain in "Skunked", where he sprayed Rigby. As Rigby began a slow evolution into a Were-Skunk himself, he hunted down the skunk in exchange for learning how to stop the process. The skunk however, does not tell Rigby the truth, as he wants Rigby to suffer the same fate that he has. After a brief fight breaks out between the two, Mordecai, who has learned that tomato paste can stop the process, intervenes and blasts both Rigby and the skunk with a can of tomato paste, which turns them both back to normal. The skunk is revealed in his true form to be a normal man, who thanks Mordecai and Rigby for helping him return to normal, before passing out.

=== The Night Owl ===
The Night Owl (voiced by Roger Craig Smith) is the villain in "Night Owl". He starts up a contest that Mordecai, Rigby, Muscle Man, and Hi Five Ghost compete in with the desire to make a fortune. When the four are the only ones left in the contest, he turns them against on another and freezes them in ice until they thaw out in the future. Realizing what had happened, they use the prize car to escape while fighting the Night Owl's henchmen, who attempt to get them back in their glass case. When attempting to escape to the past using a time machine, the Night Owl (who is now a head inside an owl robot which kept him alive for many years) tries to stop them but fails, allowing them to get to the past and stop him from starting the contest. The robot version of the Night Owl returns in "Exit 9B" as one of the villains resurrected by GBF Jr., only to be sent back to the portal of afterlife. The human version later makes a cameo in "The Thanksgiving Special". In the online game "Fist Punch", and the robot is the final boss. He is also a boss in its sequel, "Fist Punch 2".

=== The Urge ===
The Urge (voiced by Roger Craig Smith) is the lead singer of a band and the main villain in "Trash Boat". He became famous by changing his name to "The Urge", inspiring Rigby to legally change his name to "Trash Boat". The Urge later travels back in time to kill Rigby for making him lose his fame after he changed his name. "Trash Boat" escapes with Mordecai and heads to the courthouse, where he officially changes his name back to "Rigby". When everything is back to normal, the Urge does not try to kill Rigby anymore. Just then, a portal opens up, revealing another rock star who kills the Urge for the same reason the Urge wanted to kill Rigby, followed by many others. The Urge appears again in "Exit 9B" as one of the resurrected villains.

=== Zingos ===
The Zingos (voiced by William Salyers, Sam Marin and Armin Shimerman) are the trio of giant two-legged hot chicken wing creatures who live in the Inferno, and are the villains in "Bachelor Party! Zingo!!". When Skips enters a hot wing eating contest, he nearly eats them all until there are only three wings left, and falls into a subconscious state. He finds himself in the Inferno when he opens his eyes, where he encounters the Zingos and defeats them. Skips then wakes up eating the final wing while being cooled by lemonade.

=== Master Prank Caller ===
The Master Prank Caller (voiced by Tim Curry and Sam Marin) is a giant living phone with arms and legs and the villain in "Prank Callers". When Mordecai and Rigby try to prank call him, they are transported to the past along with the rest of the park gang. Eventually, they come up with a plan to prank him back and shut him down, opening a portal that leads back to the present. He then reveals himself to be an old man in disguise who just wanted to be a brilliant prank caller and asks to go with them. He is last seen making a prank call to Benson with Mordecai and Rigby. He is one of the villains revived in "Exit 9B", despite that he later befriended Mordecai and Rigby and that he was never shown to have died.

=== Huggstables ===
The Huggstables (voiced by Amber Hood and J. G. Quintel) are the small pink creatures who love to give (almost fatal) hugs, which makes the people they hug explode into glitter. They are the villains in "Sleep Fighter". After being forced to watch eight seasons of Huggstable cartoons while babysitting Starla's sister's daughter, Muscle Man had nightmares about them that lead him to constantly attack his friends while sleeping. They come up with a plan to extract the creatures from his dream using a dream catcher, but because of the overwhelming number of huggstables, they are unwillingly brought into the real world. After defeating them all with dream catchers, the mother hugstable appears, but they manage to defeat it using a large dream catcher under Skips' van. They are the parody of Teletubbies.

=== Bodybuilder ===
The Bodybuilder (voiced by Jeff Bennett) is the villain in "Rigby's Body". His body quit on him due to him over-stressing it and attempts to take Rigby's body for himself, forcing Rigby and the park gang to chase him down. While he and Rigby fight over Rigby's body, he manages to overpower Rigby only to accidentally make Mordecai crash into him, sending him flying into a slide.

=== Doug McFarland ===
Doug McFarland (voiced by Andrew Kishino) is the main villain in "World's Best Boss". When the park gang found the package was delivered, they meet Doug McFarland who refuses to give them the mug. He calls his staff crew and a battle ensues. Benson arrives and tells Doug to stop the fighting, to no avail. Benson then helps the park gang defeat the staff crew, and punches Doug, who falls inside the delivery truck, his head hitting the gas pedal, causing it to drive off of a hill and crash into a semi-truck, killing him for good.

=== Soul-Sucking Death Worm ===
The Soul-Sucking Death Worm is a monstrous colossal worm from the book and the main villain in "Dead at Eight". After Mordecai and Rigby read The Hungry, Hungry Soul-Sucking Death Worm to Thomas, they pull a tab which releases the actual Soul Worm. Thomas tried to feed Muscle Man's soul to it but Mordecai and Rigby managed to lure it back into the book. He is an obvious parody of The Very Hungry Caterpillar.

=== Demon Gophers ===
The Demon Gophers (voiced by Armin Shimerman) are a group of gophers from the putt-putt golf set and the villains appeared in "Daddy Issues". After CJ prepares for her shot, only to be attacked by a couple of gophers. Hearing CJ screaming, Mordecai runs to help her. When Mordecai arrives, CJ tells him to clear a path. After knocking out most of the gophers, a gopher the size of a human (like the Stag-Man from "Camping Can Be Cool") comes in and prepares to attack CJ and Mordecai. Upon seeing the two in danger, Carl yells at the gopher-man not to mess with CJ while she tries to putt. He then pulls out a driver, and swings his ball right into the gopher-man's groin, which causes his head to explode. With the gophers all finished, Carl tells CJ to sink her ball.

=== Warden of the Internet ===
The Warden of the Internet (voiced by Mitzi McCall) is the villain in "Go Viral". She dislikes people making pop videos and imprisons them for all eternity in a digital prison. When Mordecai, Rigby, and Pops are brought to her dimension to be imprisoned, they evade her and free the prisoners while on the run from the warden. When they are about to escape, she manages to catch them but is stopped by Wedgie Ninja, who sacrifices himself to destroy her.

=== Manslaughter and Bloodshed ===
Manslaughter and Bloodshed (voiced by Julian Holloway and Sam Marin) are the punks and villains that appeared in "Cruisin'". Manslaughter also appeared in "Fist Punch 2" as first enemy.

=== Unicorns ===
The Unicorns (voiced by Sam Marin, J. G. Quintel, Mark Hamill, and S. Scott Bullock) are the villains in "The Unicorns Have Got to Go". Mordecai and Rigby befriend them at Margaret's cafe, but end up causing trouble for them and the park gang. They and Skips set up a drag race (which unicorns never say no to), leading the Unicorns to drive off a ramp and being blown up by Benson. However, they re-appear in "House Rules", coming across Mordecai and Rigby again. The Unicorns also appear in the online games "Ride'Em Rigby" and "Fist Punch 2" as enemies and boss.

=== Matchmaker McIntyre ===
Matchmaker McIntyre (voiced by William Salyers) is the CEO of Couple Corral.com and is the villain in "Real Date". After going bankrupt due to no one ever signing up for Couple Corral, he tried to get Mordecai to dump CJ. After many attempts to split them up, McIntyre confronts them near the docks in his submarine. After firing a bazooka at Mordecai (who jumped in the way to protect CJ), CJ turns into her storm cloud form and strikes McIntyre's car which was parked near the beach. McIntyre's horned hood ornament shoots at the blimp above McIntyre and plummets right into his sub, killing him. Unbeknownst to him, Mordecai survived the blast thanks to a gift box that he had.

=== Buttonwillow McButtonwillow ===
Buttonwillow McButtonwillow (voiced by Armin Shimerman) is an old gnome and villain who appeared in "The Best VHS in the World". After he steals the tape that Mordecai and Rigby need to return, they follow him to his hideout. After some convincing, he agrees to help them return the tape in exchange for being allowed to rent it again. In the end, he receives his own rental card and uses it to rent the tape. He later appears in "Terror Tales from the Park III" in his Halloween costume. He could be a reference to Gollum from The Lord of the Rings franchise.

=== Bistro en le Parc Employees and the Maitre'd ===
The entire staff at the park's esteemed restaurant Bistro en le Parc and are seen a couple of times in the show. The employees are voiced by several different actors, all in Italian accents. Their most significant appearance is in "Fancy Restaurant", when Muscle Man meets Starla's parents, Herb Herbert and Rose Guttsmandoittor. After learning that Muscle Man was faking being fancy, the Maitre'd (voiced by Roger Craig Smith) and the staff tried to kill Muscle Man, Rigby, Mordecai, and the Guttsmandoittors. Eventually their leader, the Maitre'd, is killed by Muscle Man, who trips him and causes him to fall out a window onto a car. They all re-appear as a stage in the online game "Fist Punch", where the staff serve as henchmen and the Maitre'd as a boss.

=== Duck Collector ===
The Duck Collector (voiced by Julian Holloway) is the antagonist in the episode "A Bunch Of Baby Ducks" who offers to buy the ducks from Mordecai and Rigby, only for them to turn down his offer on the account of him being too creepy. He eventually steals them and is pursued by the duo and the ducks' mother. After the mother duck is knocked unconscious during the fight, the Collector tries to kill Rigby using a military sword. Enraged, the Baby Ducks defend their surrogate father by turning into a Duck Man. They then chopped the Collector in two, killing him instantly. He is one of the numerous villains to be resurrected in "Exit 9B" but is once again chopped in half by the Ducks. He is the main villain in the online game "Winging It" in the game's story mode.

=== Youthtopia Members ===
The Youthtopia Members named Stan, Officer Hank and Officer Glenn (all voiced by Danny Cooksey and John Cygan) who are the main villains appearing in "I See Turtles". He was the owner of Youthtopia, an illegal spa. He realised his spa turtle was getting old, so he ordered brand new ones for himself. Later he asked Officer Hank and Officer Glen to arrest Mordecai and CJ for trespassing. He was killed by Eileen's turtles. The two are caught in the process, and after screaming at them, the two are thrown into a police car by two cops called Glenn and Hank, who are also members of the spa. Just as the Youthtopia guys and the police officers go to find more turtles, Mordecai and CJ are unsuccessful at escaping. Both of them along with the Youthtopia workers are killed by the Turtles.

=== No Rules Man ===
The No Rules Man (voiced by Roger Craig Smith) is the main antagonist in "House Rules". After Mordecai and Rigby, who were searching for a place to hang out, meet him, he introduces them to the Land of No Rules, the type of place that Mordecai and Rigby have been looking for. At first they enjoy, but when they spot the unicorns from "The Unicorns Have Got to Go", they tell the No Rules Man to get rid of them. This angers him, causing him to order everyone to stop the two, but it fails, and prompts Mordecai and Rigby to leave. Later, when the No Rules Man is playing video games, a note reading "no video games" is dropped and lands on his lap. After reading it, he explodes. He is one of the villains revived in "Exit 9B", and is killed by the Baby Ducks in their giant form.

=== Game Store Manager ===
The Game Store Manager (voiced by Roger Craig Smith) is the main antagonist in "But I Have a Receipt". Mordecai and Rigby buy a role-playing game called "The Realm of Darthon" from his store, but return it after the park gang does not enjoy it. When the manager refuses to refund them even though Mordecai and Rigby have a receipt, the duo manages to sabotage his business until he does. The angry manager eventually traps them in the game and becomes the knight Darthon. When he almost defeats them, the duo realize that players control the game by using their imagination. They finally win when Mordecai stabs Darthon with an immunity sword, and the three re-appear in the real world, in which the manager was really impaled by a ruler. Although the duo enjoy the game and decline the refund, the manager gives their money back and drives away before Mordecai and Rigby could help him. He supposedly died, as his Darthon version was one of the revived villains in "Exit 9B". However, he later makes a cameo in "That's My Television".

=== Ygbir ===
Ygbir (voiced by William Salyers and later, vocal effects provided by Roger Craig Smith) Rigby's majordomo and later negative counterpart who appears in "Dizzy" and "Jinx". When Pops enters his dream where he encounters some speech demons included Iacedrom, Mordecai's doppelganger and Ygbir, Rigby's majordomo and counterpart. After Pops gives Mordecai and Rigby his speech, they refuses saying "no speeches", he escapes from his dream, until they find a way out. Ygbir returns as a regular demon known as "Ybgir" in "Jinx" after Rigby tries to break his jinx. When Rigby tries to follow Muscle Man's instructions to un-jinx himself on his own he releases Ybgir from a bathroom mirror. Rigby and Mordecai must then try to stop Ybgir from turning the entire city into zombies. They eventually un-jinx Ybgir, which sends him back to the mirror, defeating him.

=== Mr. Ross ===
Mr. Ross (voiced by Jason Mantzoukas) is the main antagonist of "Regular Show: The Movie". He was the volleyball coach and science teacher at Mordecai and Rigby's high school. When Rigby screws up the school's chance to win the state volleyball championship, Ross plans an elaborate revenge plot to make a time machine to win the championship, and get revenge on Rigby. It is revealed that the reason why Rigby messes up Mr. Ross' school volleyball team from winning the match, was originally meant to teach his bully, Jablonski a lesson, as Ross was not aware of Jablonski's bullying nature. When Rigby tells his younger-self not to repeat his past mistake for unintentionally turning Mr. Ross into a villain, even Mordecai changes sides in the future without telling his reason why he ruined Mr. Ross' game, the younger Mr. Ross is relieved to hear the younger Rigby's apologies and his reasons for this before being sent to jail, retconning the fate of Mr. Ross and Mordecai's future. He is seen in the same cell as Doug Shablowski when the park is suddenly sent to space.

=== Halloween Villains ===
==== Percy ====
Percy
- First appearance: "Terror Tales of The Park" (2011)
- Last appearance: "Meet the Seer" (2017) (in a security camera)
- Voiced by: William Salyers

In-universe information
- Species: Doll
- Gender: Male

Percy (voiced by William Salyers) is the name of a Victorian Doll that Pops had owned ever since he was a child. He had the ability to talk and spoke with a deep voice, which is very strange, considering that his appearance is that of a cherubic, really young British boy. He was the most sophisticated doll of his day, with 250 phrases stored inside. Yet the only real phrases we heard him say had to do with an obsessive desire to draw on peoples' faces. Percy not only spoke of his obsession, but it was discovered that he was also an autonomous, "living doll" who actually carried out his intentions and threats of drawing on peoples' faces. He drew on Pops's face after Pops tried to throw him away, and when Pops tried playing teatime with him after Mordecai and Rigby threw him away, Percy became aggressive and wanted to draw on Pops's face even more. Mordecai and Rigby tried to rescue Pops, but Percy escaped and went into the basement. When Mordecai, Rigby, and Pops went after him, Percy knocked Mordecai and Rigby unconscious with a shovel. Percy demanded Pops to bring him a marker so he could draw on Mordecai and Rigby's faces, but then Pops stood up for himself and told Percy that it's not cool for a grown man like him to play with dolls and that Percy must go away. Percy then ran towards Pops to attack him, while Pops did the same. Pops kicked him into the furnace, where he started to melt. He then climbed back out of the furnace in one last attempt to draw on their faces, but instead ended up collapsing onto the floor.

==== Skull Punch ====
Skull Punch is the name of a supposedly British heavy metal band that had died and returned as ghosts, living in an old looking RV in The Park. After Muscle Man and Hi Five Ghost decided to crash their RV into a crash pit they had made two weeks ago, the ghosts captured them and planned to leave them inside of the RV when it exploded in the crash pit. They are one of the only people that died twice on Regular Show. They performed a rock song while the RV was going into the crash pit, but failed to jump off before it went into the hole, and they died again. The names of each band member (as revealed during the credits) are Harold (lead singer and guitarist) (voiced by Robin Atkin Downes), Nigel (bassist) (voiced by Sam Marin), and Archie (drummer) (voiced by Julian Holloway). All three band members were only seen in "Terror Tales of the Park", being in one of the shorts: "Death Metal Crash Pit". The Skull Punch are revived by Garrett Bobby Ferguson Jr. in "Exit 9B", despite that they appeared only in a horror story that may not have happened. But they were eventually sent back to the portal.

==== Halloween Wizard ====
Halloween Wizard
- First appearance: "Terror Tales of The Park" (2011)
- Voiced by: Mark Hamill

In-universe information
- Species: Human
- Gender: Male
- Occupation: Wizard
- Home: Haunted House

The Halloween Wizard (voiced by Mark Hamill) only appears in "Terror of the Park". He lives inside of a large, supposedly haunted mansion, which was egged by Rigby due to him turning off the light and not responding when being asked by Rigby to give him candy. This led him to seek revenge on Rigby. He later lurked around Pops's House and used his dark magic to turn Rigby into a nice-looking house. Later that night when it was dark, Muscle Man was on the porch and then saw him driving his car to the front of the house and comes out invisible. Muscle Man tells him to change Rigby back and to get out of there, as well as loading his shotgun telling him not to ask twice. The Halloween Wizard then teases him and asks Muscle Man if he has any clever jokes about his mom, Muscle Man tells him not to talk about his mom so he starts firing in random directions, to no avail. Everyone else watches him shooting the gun but Muscle Man gets knocked over. The wizard then drags him across the grass, yelling and holding his gun up in the air while being dragged and fires the gun a few more times before he goes into the woods. Mordecai, shocked, asks if they saw that. Then there is a knocking on the door, which opens and reveals Muscle Man, who has had his skin ripped off, showing only muscle (inferring that the Wizard had skinned him). Muscle Man says, "I told you I was ripped", then falls over and dies after that and scares the others then the phone rings. Hi Five Ghost goes to answer it, after Skips tells him not to, and answers the phone saying, "Hello?". The wizard then says "Good-bye!" and sucks him into the phone and turns him into liquid that squirts onto Mordecai and Skips. Mordecai is then knocked unconscious when the wizard throws him against the bookshelf. Benson and Pops see this and they both scream and run into different rooms. Then the wizard breaks Skips' crossbow and the wizard throws Skips into the chimney and burns him. Then he goes to the bathroom and pulls back the curtains for the shower and finds Benson and says, "What's up Gumball?". Benson then screams and gets flushed down the toilet. Then, Pops is on the bed terrified and the wizard comes in and Pops fires a rock at the wizard with his slingshot but misses and the wizard picks him up, drags him on the ceiling, and puts him in the closet which falls over, then disappears. Rigby is scared and asks if anyone was there. Mordecai then wakes up and tells him that he won't let anything happen to him, but the wizard decapitates him. Then, Rigby finds out that Mordecai has died and he says sorry to the wizard. Then the wizard comes and gives Rigby his punishment by throwing eggs at him. Then Rigby becomes angry because the wizard turned him into a house and killed everyone so he can egg him. The wizard then drowns him in a giant raw egg. It is then revealed that it was just a story that Rigby told. Muscle Man then makes fun of his story saying that it was weak and that his story about wrecking cars in a pit was way better. But Rigby says that "that's not it" and turns out to be the wizard who disguised himself as Rigby. Everyone else is freaked out and screams as the wizard finishes the episode by saying, "Happy Halloween!" The Halloween Wizard also appears in an online game "Fist Punch 2" as an enemy and boss.

==== Party Bus Driver ====
The Party Bus Driver (voiced by Mark Hamill) is a mummy with purple sunglasses who appeared in "Terror Tales of the Park II" as the main antagonist of the short, "Party Bus". Mordecai, Rigby, Margaret, and Eileen agreed to take a ride in the party bus but after realizing that they get older while the bus moves forward, they attempt to escape. After being threatened by Mordecai to stop the bus, his bandages fly off, revealing him to be a skeleton and he makes the bus go faster, causing the gang to age quicker. He was pulled out of the driver's seat by Mordecai, causing him to fly backwards and break into pieces. Mordecai then puts the bus in reverse causing them to get younger. After the four escape the bus through a roof hatch, they, along with the driver and the bus, disintegrate and the story ends.

==== Jan the Wallpaper Man ====
Jan the Wallpaper Man (or simply known as Jan or The Wallpaper Man) (voiced by Andrew Daly) is the main antagonist in "Terror Tales of the Park II's Wallpaper Man story. At first glance, he is but a simple, middle-aged, worker for hire guy, but in reality, he uses his wallpapering skills as an opportunity to feed himself. His true form is a giant, evil, predator tarantula. He can spin silk that looks like red and black wallpaper. He cocooned Pops and the gang but they are saved by Mordecai and Rigby. He was killed at the end of the story by Muscle Man's grenades, taking the duo with him.

==== Johnny Allenwrench ====
Johnny Allenwrech (voiced by William Salyers) appeared in "Terror Tales of the Park III" as the main antagonist of the short "Killer Bed". He was the spirit of a serial killer that got trapped into a bed. Rigby buys a bed from a company called UMÄK, not realizing that Johnny's body is in the box. After talking to Mordecai in the kitchen he brings the bed into his bedroom to assemble together, Rigby tries to assemble the bed by himself, but fails through attempting for four hours, afterwards he gets Skips to help build the bed which was completed by seven hours. After assembling the bed, Rigby lays down on the bed and finds it very comfortable. He then turns on the television and eventually tunes in to a live news channel where the news reporter asks a question, "Did you buy a bed recently?" Rigby replies by saying "Yes", the news reporter says this may have been a fatal mistake, he then explains during a shootout with police at a UMÄK factory, Johnny Allenwrench, a potential murderer fell into a UMÄK machine where he was manufactured into a bed. The reporter then goes on to say due to a clearing error, the bed was shipped out to stores, and now the company is reclaiming the KILLÜRGEN beds back. Rigby then says that he feels sorry for "the loser who brought that bed", but after finding out his new bed was made by the same company, he claims he's also "one of those losers". Eventually, the news reporter receives the code for the bed that contains the murderer. He then reads the code out saying: "If you have this bed code number you are sleeping on a murderer, 623570406 the last number is smudged he grabs his glasses and says it is an 8". The bed then molds and captures Rigby within it. The bed then threatens Rigby with a hex key, however Benson tells him that he'll give him a job if he lets Rigby free. The next day, Johnny is shown watering some flowers when he suddenly attacked by the groundskeepers who cut him down into a few pieces of wood. The scene then opens out, to show Benson and Rigby, who were watching the whole thing. Benson congratulates Rigby on planning the ambush, whilst Rigby congratulates Benson on lying to Johnny's face.

==== Scarecrow ====
The Scarecrow (voiced by Mark Hamill) is a character who appears in "Terror Tales of the Park III" as the main antagonist in "Jacked-Up Jack-o-Lantern". When Mordecai, Rigby, Muscle Man, and Hi Five Ghost destroy his pumpkin wife (after ignoring his warnings that say to leave them alone), he comes to life. He then proceeds to touch everybody, which turns them all into pumpkins before squishing them and eventually planting their seeds in the pumpkin patch so that their heads grow into pumpkins. By the end of the episode, he laughs while they all argue on who should go home with a mother and her son, knowing that he had avenged his wife. It is unknown why the female scarecrow wasn't able to come to life.

==== Jebediah Townhouse ====
Jebediah Townhouse (voiced by William Salyers) is a minor character in the show. He makes his debut in the episode "Terror Tales of the Park III". It is said that he lived in the house 200 years ago and was ahead of his time. More so than most others who are considered ahead of their time, since he acted and spoke like it was the 1980s. Since he behaved and talked oddly, the townsfolk thought that he was a wizard, and tried to murder him. Before they could, he put his soul into the house and exclaimed he would show them all and return in 200 years when everyone talked and acted like him, and he would be king of the world. When he realized everyone in his time would be long dead by then, he vowed to come back in the form of a murderous poltergeist to haunt and kill whoever is inside of the house, but before doing so, he signed his house over to Mr. Maellard. Unfortunately for Townhouse, his predicted time of return bypassed the eighties, when he would have been in style. Meaning now, instead of being far too ahead of his time, his mannerisms were considered old fashioned and out of touch. 200 years later on Halloween night, Benson told his fellow park workers the story of Jebediah as well as a scary story about him, which involved Mordecai, Rigby, Pops, Muscle Man, and Hi Five Ghost trying to escape from him after taking on a dare to survive the whole night in the house but are one by one killed, afterwards proceeding to tell them that he was indeed a real person. Jebediah then finally manifested and scared off everyone in the house and proceeds to wish the viewers a Happy Halloween.

==== Ghost Mordecai and Ghost Rigby ====
They are minor villains in "Terror Tales of the Park IV". After Mordecai and Rigby died, Skips warns Benson that they will keep haunting him until he fires them. After a battle between the ghosts, Benson successfully fired them but realizes that it was he who died, not the duo, who have been promoted.

==== The Hole ====
It is a minor villain in "Terror Tales of the Park IV". The park workers must sacrifice one another to prevent the hole from destroying the park. Hi Five Ghost was the first to be sacrificed and Pops was to be the next victim. Fortunately, his head was too big for the hole to swallow so the park workers no longer needed to make any more sacrifices.

==== John Wolfhard ====
John Wolfhard is one of the villains from "Terror Tales of the Park V". He is on trial for eating a man and the park staff were on the jury. He does a terrible job trying to defend himself as the evidence that were presented to him clearly proved that he ate someone. Before the park crew could vote him guilty, Pops decided to use the restroom first, which gave him the idea to ask the judge if he can use the restroom too, which the judge allowed him to do unsupervised. When inside the restroom, he first asked Pops for some toilet paper. He then turns into a werewolf and attacked him and then bit Pops to turn him into a werewolf so he can take his place. He tells Pops he's going to a place where his kind will be respected, London. After he left, Pops becomes a werewolf and everyone thinks he's Wolfhard. After Pops escapes to the airport as a werewolf and boards a plane to London, he runs into Wolfhard again. He apologizes to Pops for mauling and Pops is willing to let it go. He later invites Pops to have tea at the Royal Palace with him and his friends and will later try to eat the Queen, which Pops happily accepts. John Wolfhard also appears in an online game "Fist Punch 2" as an enemy and boss.

==== Barber ====
The Barber (voiced by John Cygan) is one of the villains from "Terror Tales of the Park IV". He not only cuts his victim's hair, but their heads too.

==== School Girl Villain ====
The School Girl Villain (voiced by Grey DeLisle) is one of the villains from "Terror Tales of the Park IV". If anyone tries to befriend her, she will swallow them whole.

==== Racki the Wishmaker ====
Racki the Wishmaker
- First appearance: "Terror Tales of The Park V" (2015)
- Voiced by: Steven Blum

In-universe information
- Species: Evil wishmaker machine
- Gender: Male
- Occupation: Wishmaker

Racki the Wishmaker (voiced by Steven Blum) is an evil wishmaker machine who appears in "Terror Tales of the Park V". Benson rented him for the Halloween party in the park house and shows anyone what happens if their wishes comes true through visions but they usually have a cruel twist to it. He would make his eyes glow red and makes the person who is asking the wish eyes glow red, too. He showed his wish visions to Benson, Pops, and Hi Five Ghost, but when he does Rigby, he has everyone see his vision. After finishing Rigby's vision, he robs the park staff and tries to escape with the other wishmakers. When he tries to use the catapult to escape, he is too heavy to be launched further and he ends up crashing a few feet from the catapult. While the park staff laughs at his misfortune, Racki laughs at Benson because now he cannot get his $500 security deposit back, result in Benson screaming "No!". It turns out that the entire episode was a vision for Benson who is at a Halloween store and he asked Racki on wishing to throw the best Halloween party ever. When the Halloween store worker asked how he likes it, Benson said it is terrible and he refuses to rent Racki if he cannot get his security deposit back so he went to the streamer store instead. The store worker scolds Racki for scaring away another customer but Racki responds by telling him that his boss should fire him which results in the store worker unplugging Racki. Racki also appears in the online game "High Flying Halloween".

==== Mr. Bossman ====
Mr. Bossman (voiced by Sam Marin) is a ventriloquist dummy and is one of the villains from "Terror Tales of the Park V". When Benson needed to motivate Mordecai and Rigby to work, he saw a commercial on TV about Mr. Bossman and that he would help motivate workers. While it does motivate Mordecai and Rigby, Mr. Bossman intends to take Benson's job away to support his family. Benson runs to the Park house to get help from Mordecai and Rigby but Mr. Bossman manages to catch up to him and he attacks Benson to prevent his escape. Mordecai and Rigby tell Benson to use the Salad Guillotine, which Mordecai and Rigby saw in a commercial and actually bought it, and Benson uses it to decapitate Mr. Bossman.

==== Elevator Repairman ====
Elevator Repairman
- First appearance: "Terror Tales of The Park V" (2015)
- Voiced by: Jeff Glen Bennett

In-universe information
- Occupation: Elevator repairman

The Elevator Repairman (voiced by Jeff Bennett) is one of the villains from "Terror Tales of the Park V". Hi Five Ghost first meets him when he's going to meet Celia and asked if the elevator was fixed and he said it was and he let Hi Five Ghost use the elevator. When the elevator stops working, Hi Five Ghost calls him to fix it but he messes with Hi Five Ghost by playing ominous music and making the elevator go up and down very fast. When Hi Five Ghost finally meets Celia, she informs him that the elevator has been broken the entire time and the elevator repairman died 40 years ago. When Hi Five Ghost and Celia hears the elevator door opening, they both look inside and see the repairman transform into a ghoul. He grabs Hi Five Ghost and makes the elevator crash into the bottom which then explodes in flames.

==== Chocolate Witch ====
The Chocolate Witch (voiced by Courtenay Taylor) is one of the villains from "Terror Tales of the Park VI". She has the power to transform victims into chocolate statues.

==== Sharks ====
The Sharks are one of the villains from "Terror Tales of the Park VI". They serve as Benson's greatest fears on Fear Planet.

==== Flying Disc Freestylers ====
The Flying Disc Freestylers are one of the villains from "Terror Tales of the Park VI". They serve as Skips' greatest fear on Fear Planet.

==== Amusement Park Mascots ====
The Amusement Park Mascots are one of the villains from "Terror Tales of the Park VI". They are Rigby's greatest fears on Fear Planet.

==== Vampires ====
The Vampires are one of the villains from "Terror Tales of the Park VI". When Mordecai, Rigby, Muscle Man, Eileen and Skips arrive in their mansion, they are one by one captured and turned into vampires and join them into catching their next victims.

==== Shannon Acidbutt ====
Shannon Acidbutt (vocal effects provided by Roger Craig Smith) is the antagonist in "Alien Roommates" from "Terror Tales of the Park VI". In her first appearance, she appeared in an interview for a position as new roommate. She was accepted for her large amount of money, despite being creepy to them. She has shown to be very obnoxious and after a while, the park gang decide to kick her out, but she refuses to leave and continue watching TV. After Muscle Man turns off the TV she goes on a crazy rampage and they use the TV to get her out. They lead her to a space vacuum but uses her acid to melt the controls to release her in space. But Muscle Man grabs her in a robot suit and gets himself stuck in space forever with her.

=== Musical Villains ===
The following characters are villains who are also professional or small-time performers.

==== CrewCrew ====
The CrewCrew was a rap group who tried to insult Pops. They were later defeated by Pops with the help of Mordecai and Rigby in a rap battle. Led by Alpha-Dog (voiced by Donald Glover), members of the CrewCrew were Blitz Comet (voiced by Tyler, The Creator), Demel-Ishun (voiced by MC Lyte), François (voiced by Kevin Michael Richardson) and V-Tron (voiced by Jeffery Todd Fischer).

==== Summertime Song ====
The Summertime Song (voiced by Sean Szeles) is a living tape with the fictional band "Solid Bold" song Summertime Lovin' on it. After coming to life and brutally annoying the park gang, Mordecai, Rigby, Skips, and the rest come up with an even catchier song and destroy the tape for good. The Summertime is revived in "Exit 9B", but is killed again, this time by Mordecai with a pole.

==== Future Mordecai and Future Rigby ====
Future Mordecai and Future Rigby are Mordecai and Rigby's future counterparts who appeared in "Mordecai and the Rigbys". They appear when soda was spilled on some record players, which summoned Mordecai and Rigby's future selves, who taught them how to be musicians. When Mordecai and Rigby perform on stage, they stop when they realize that the music was playing from a tape. After Mordecai criticizes how lip-synching is "not cool", the future counterparts disappear. They make a cameo in "Bad Kiss", seen when Mordecai and Rigby travel back in time.

=== Happy Birthday ===
Happy Birthday (voiced by Kevin Michael Richardson) is an evil cake and the main antagonist in "Happy Birthday Song Contest". When he heard that Farmer Jimmy was holding a contest to change his song, and that Mordecai and Rigby were going to sing a new original song, he interrupted the competition and proved his song was still good through the use of a hypnotic confetti and singing in a slow, crooner-like fashion. Mordecai and Rigby, however, beat him with their lighter and shortened version of the song. Everyone enjoyed it and they ended up winning, but he swears revenge by saying that everyone will grow tired of Mordecai and Rigby's new song one day, and that his song will be popular again.

=== Coffee Bean and the Translator ===
The Coffee Bean (voiced by S. Scott Bullock in the first appearance, Sam Marin in later appearances) is, as his name states, an anthropomorphic coffee bean. He can only say the word, "coffee", which is why he is followed by a man known as the Translator (voiced by Mark Hamill), who resembles a Japanese businessman and translates his speech. They are first seen in "Caffeinated Concert Tickets", where they are in line to get tickets for the Fist Pump reunion concert. After over-hearing Mordecai and Rigby's plan to put more time in at work, the duo show up with a contract that Rigby immediately signs for both of them. After forgetting to buy Coffee Bean and the Translator's tickets, they are put under by chamomile tea, "the sleepiest of all teas", and awake to find that the duo have stolen their tickets. After reclaiming their tickets, Mordecai and Rigby enter the concert hall, ditching Coffee Bean and Translator. They are mentioned in "Cool Cubed". The Cool Cubed drink resembles an anthropomorphic slushie drink. He can say the word "freeze", instead of "coffee", which is why he is followed by a man known as the Translator, who resembles a Siberian Yupik and translates his speech. When Mordecai and Rigby entering Thomas' brain, they found the Cool Cubed drink and the Translator who is going to freeze Thomas' brain core. Mordecai and Rigby must stop and melt them, killing them for good. They later make cameos in "Dodge This" and "I Like You Hi". The Coffee Bean also appears in an online game "Fist Punch 2" as an enemy and boss and the Translator appears an online game "Battle for the Behemoths" as the master of Snowballs.

=== Reaper Bots ===
The Reaper Bots are the main villains in "Cool Bro Bots" who call themselves "Bro Bots" to hide their identity. They come to the park dome and pretend to be nice to steal their environment to gain money for the black market. Mordecai and Rigby are suspicious of their antics, which causes a wedge between them and the rest of the park gang through a series of disbelief and causes Benson to send them away in anger. After Chance Sureshot, Toothpick Sally, and Recap Robot show up and reveal their scheme (which is backed up by the giant lumberjack and bull robots and thus, proving Mordecai and Rigby right), they blow their cover and attack the park gang and the trio but are eventually destroyed in the end.

=== Grand Master Sensei of Death Kwon Do ===
The Grand Master Sensei of Death Kwon Do (voiced by Steve Blum) is the cruel sensei and adopted father of the Sensei. In "Sandwich of Death", the Sensei takes Mordecai, Rigby and Benson to the Grand Master's dojo for the Sandwich of Life, the only known cure for Benson's potentially fatal illness as a result of him unknowingly eating the Sandwich of Death the wrong way. Because the Sensei could not request a meeting since his master holds a grudge against him, the four manage to sneak into the building, going through the obstacles and fighting past the guards. In the final chamber, they confront the Grand Master of Death Kwon Do, who is protecting the Sandwich of Life and the Double Death Sandwich. There, the Master Sensei reveals that he is angry at the Sensei for stealing his recipe of the Death Sandwich and mass-producing it without his permission. After Sensei apologizes and accepts full responsibility for his actions, the Master does not forgive him and orders his guards to kill him, Mordecai, Rigby and Benson. When he sends the Double Death Sandwich flying at Mordecai and Rigby, the Sensei quickly teaches them a move called the "Bicycle Kick of Death", which the duo uses to kick the sandwich into the mouth of the Grand Master, killing him. The Grand Master's death also resulted in the destruction of his dojo and mountain, although the gang manage to escape before the entire mountain collapses. The Grand Master of Death Kwon Do is the final boss in the video game "Fist Punch 2".

=== Guardian of Secrets ===
The Guardian of Secrets (voiced by Janie Haddad-Tompkins) is a giant being who resembles Margaret and the protector of Margaret's secrets who appears in "Diary". Rigby unleashes her after foolishly looking at Margaret's secrets while repairing Margaret's diary, and she attempts to destroy Mordecai, Rigby, and Skips for looking at Margaret's secrets. This forces the trio to each reveal a secret of their own to defeat her. The Guardian of Secrets appears in an online game, Battle of the Behemoths.

=== Bert Coleman ===
Bert Coleman (voiced by Troy Baker) is the main antagonist in "Expert or Liar". After humiliating Rigby on the penultimate episode of a season of his show, Rigby seeks out revenge. After tricking Bert into letting him back onto the show (even though "repeat guests" are forbidden), Bert brings Rigby to a video game-esque dimension, and asks Rigby questions. After revealing himself as a video game expert, Rigby punches Bert off of a platform, making him fall to his death and being devoured by a pixelated version of Garrett Bobby Ferguson before exploding.

=== Angus ===
Angus (voiced by Robin Atkin Downes and Roger Craig Smith) is the main antagonist in "Mordecai and Rigby Down Under". He is first seen at Outback Joey's, drinking a Koala Cola and ranting about the Australian Prime Minister's return, while Mordecai and Rigby are trying to find a way to get back to USA after being accidentally shipped to Australia while sleeping in the box. When he hears the news about the Prime Minister returning to Australia after a surgery on his stomach, Angus made a vow to punch the Prime Minister before going to toilet. The following day, he arrives at the airport, around the same time when Mordecai and Rigby accidentally released the kangaroos into attacking the Prime Minister and his bodyguards. Angus charges towards the Prime Minister while his bodyguards were occupied by the kangaroos, and aims his punch towards the Prime Minister's stomach However, Mordecai was able to thwart this attempt by stealking a nearby rugby team's football and pitching it towards Angus. The ball hits the back of Angus's head causing him to barely miss the Prime Minister's stomach and punch himself instead, knocking him unconscious. He then falls down the stairs where he is noticed by the news reporters who recognize that he was a former candidate for the position of Prime Minister of Australia and laugh at him for still being mad that he lost the election.

=== Benson Slides ===
The Benson Slides (voiced by Sam Marin) are five living 2D slides of Benson who have the same behavior as the real Benson. They appear in "Bad Portrait" after Rigby damages a projector camera that brings them to life. They are unhappy with the duo for destroying a painting of Benson and recreating it in a bad way, leading them to attack the duo and try to destroy the deformed painting, but with the help of a hologram of Benny Harris, they defeat the slides using paint.

=== British Taxi ===
The British Taxi (voiced by Mark Hamill) is a murderous British taxi who appears in "Ello Gov'ner". After watching a horror movie about it, Rigby begins to have nightmares as well as seeing hallucinations of it. It later apparently becomes real and chases Rigby, Mordecai, and Pops until it corners Rigby, who overcomes his fear and attacks it, which soon reveals that the taxi was actually a mascot in a costume. This whole episode and car could be a parody of The Car (1977) or Christine (1983).

=== Limosaurus ===
The Limosaurus is a fire-breathing dinosaur made of limos who first appears in "Limousine Lunchtime". He is the last challenge of the Limo Demolition Derby that Mordecai and Rigby must face to win the contest. Although it overwhelms them, they manage to defeat it with the help of a meatball sub and a missile from their limo.

=== Snow Mammoth ===
The Snow Mammoth (voiced by Jeff Bennett) is a giant snow monster who first appears in "The Ice Tape".

=== Sandwich Monster ===
The Sandwich Monster (also known as "The Number 46") (voiced by William Salyers) is a creature from an imaginary story told by Mordecai and Rigby in "Lunch Break". In the story, they are disgusted from eating nutrition cubes that are the only thing that they can find since the earth blew up. Then a collision occurs and Rigby is sent to investigate after inevitably losing in punchies, where he finds truck of sandwiches to eat. They microwave what they find and try to eat it. But when Mordecai tries to cut it, the sandwich reveals itself to be alive and they chase after it, through the Park and house, a mountain, a stage, until they reach a rooftop. But then the sandwich is catapulted to another rooftop by a spatula from the sky, and then the spatula swats Mordecai and Rigby into the ocean. through space, and into a building where they meet RGB2.

=== Stag Man ===
The Stag Man (voiced by Robert Englund) is a part-stag, part-human creature and the main antagonist in "Camping Can Be Cool". He is angry with Mordecai, Rigby, Margaret, and Eileen for unawarely trespassing in his forest and intends to hunt them down, but plays fair and lets them get a head start. He proceeds to chase them down until he is hit by a truck and taken into custody by the forest rangers. The Stag Man later makes a cameo in "Bad Kiss", seen when Mordecai and Rigby travel back in time. He then re-appears in "Exit 9B", as one of the revived villains. His appearance is similar to that of the legendary creature known as the Wendigo or maybe the Pope Lick Monster. His appearance and hunter-like nature is also very similar to that of Hircine, the daedric prince of the hunt from the Elder Scrolls series.

=== Mordecai and Rigby Holograms ===
The Mordecai and Rigby Holograms (voiced by J. G. Quintel and William Salyers) are the villains in "The Best Burger in the World". Mordecai and Rigby create them to trick Benson long enough to get the burger they want, but they come to life and also want to get their hands on the burger, leading to a fight between the duo and their holograms (with Benson being caught in the middle of it), until the former defeat the latter with rocks.

=== Country Club Leader ===
The Country Club Leader (voiced by Mark Hamill) is the manager of a rich country club that has a history of confiscating objects from other people, including the groundskeepers, and turning them into toilets with a toilet-making machine. In "Country Club", his guards take the golf cart away from Mordecai and Rigby. The duo sneaks inside the main country club house to retrieve it, only to be captured. The manager tells them of his plans to not only turn the cart into a toilet, but to shoot it into outer space as well for the summer solstice event, with a rocket on a ramp. He then decides to turn Mordecai and Rigby into toilets and launch them into space as well. Just as he is about to do so, the rest of the park gang crash through the country club gate and free the two. As a battle between the park gang and the country club henchmen happens, Mordecai and Rigby climb into the cart and drive into the country club leader, pushing him in the toilet-making machine, where he was turned into a toilet and placed onto the rocket, launching him into space.

=== Milk People ===
The Milk People are white colored creatures who wear masks that cover their fangs and have the power to turn victims into one of them. They are the villains of "Guy's Night". After Pops nearly completes the milk drinking challenge, he is brought to their lair. When he and the other competitors realize that they've been keeping them here to prevent them from completing the challenge, they become hostile, forcing them to escape. Although Pops manages to escape with the other competitors, two of them are left behind.

=== Mitsuru Shinehara and Announcer Bot ===
Mitsuru Shinehara (voiced by Andrew Kishino) and Announcer Bot (voiced by Sam Marin) are the villains appeared in "Fool Me Twice". When Mordecai, Rigby and Benson entered the Fool Me Twice game show, They met Mitsuru Shinehara and Announcer Bot who announces the Fool Me Twice game show is about to begin. The game show begins and the three completes all the challenges and gets their prize, killing them for good.

=== Wickets ===
The Wickets are a street gang who have an obsession for croquet and hatred of cell phones. They are the villains of "Picking Up Margaret". Mordecai obliviously walks into the turf while answering a phone call from Margaret, whom he planned to take to the airport. He is encountered by the Wickets, who strictly warn him about their prohibition of cell phones, and then arrives at the auto shop to pick up Benson's car, since the cart is unavailable for use. When Raymond the mechanic talks to Benson about an issue via Mordecai's cell phone, he and Mordecai are ambushed by the Wickets. While the mechanic distracts the Wickets with a flamethrower, Mordecai gets into Benson's car and drives off to pick up Margaret. On their way to the airport, the Wickets catch up with them in a truck and two motorcycles and attack the car. Mordecai drives into a ramp under construction and shakes them off, causing one of the motorcycles to crash into a box and the other to bump into a wall as its two drivers fall to their death. Mordecai then drives off the railing of an unfinished bridge. Unable to turn, the last three Wickets drive off the end of an unfinished bridge into a cell phone billboard, killing them.

=== Barry ===
Barry (voiced by Lex Lang) is a criminal from the 70s and the villain who appeared in "Every Meat Burritos", where he steals a bag of burritos from Mordecai, Rigby, Muscle Man, and Hi Five Ghost while they were in his car and was arrested by them to the police.

=== Knitted Muscle Man ===
The Knitted Muscle Man (voiced by Sam Marin) is the main antagonist in the Season 7 episode "Favorite Shirt", he is created after Mordecai and Rigby put Muscle Man's favorite shirt into a 3D knitting machine after ruining it. However one of his hairs on the shirt causes an error thus creating the evil Knitted Muscle Man monster. The knitter scans and starts to put the shirt together, and it goes well until it stumbles on an error: a foreign object which is just Muscle Man's hair. It asks if they want to use all detected materials, and Rigby, who wants to hurry, says they don't have time for this and presses yes, much to HFG's dismay, who tried to pull him away. Rigby insists it's fine, trying to tell them they need to act on their instincts, but a shocked HFG and Mordecai point behind him - to a knitted-up Muscle Man figure. The inside of Knitted Muscle Man's mouth resembles that of The Muppets.

=== Broseph Chillaxton ===
Broseph Chillaxton (voiced by Robin Atkin Downes) is an invisible man who is the judge of a galactic court and appears in "Cool Bikes", in which Mordecai and Rigby are arrested for being "too cool" and taken to "Intergalactic Cool Court". Benson, who kept denying that they were cool, finally admits that they are when he is brought as a witness, but helps them escape after the judge sentences them to death. As the three exit the court's ship, Mordecai and Rigby throw their bicycles into a satellite dish, which explodes and destroys the whole court. Broseph Chillaxton later makes a cameo in "Exit 9B" as one of the revived villains.

=== President of Tants Co. ===
The President of Tants Co.(voiced by Roger Craig Smith) is a president and villain of the Tants Co. Company who appeared in "Tants".

=== Renaissance Dragon ===
The Renaissance Dragon is the villain appeared in "Marvelo the Wizard".

=== Hector ===
Hector (voiced by Andres Salaff) is a fireworks dealer and the main villain in "Firework Run". He runs a secret firework and chile relleno-selling business called "South of the Line" and is an old friend of Muscle Man, who visits his warehouse to buy fireworks for the Park's Fourth of July event, accompanied by Mordecai, Rigby and Hi Five Ghost. Rigby spies on a jumbo-sized firework called "El Diablo", which Hector reveals a prophecy that if it is lit, it would kill him. When Mordecai, Rigby, Muscle Man and Hi Five Ghost stumble upon his secret for chile rellenos (gunpowder stuffed in jalapeños), Hector tries to kill them so his secret would not be shared. The four are captured and chained to a bench in his warehouse, and Hector lights an explosive made from his chili rellenos. However, the park workers walk up and as the bench is destroyed in the explosion. Rigby steals the El Diablo firework, and Muscle Man traps Hector and his henchmen inside the warehouse, which he then blows up using one of Hector's chili rellenos. After the groundskeepers return to the Park with the El Diablo, Hector suddenly appears, having survived the explosion and revealing himself as a cyborg. He shoots a firework at the park gang, but hits El Diablo instead, setting it off. A firework version of the "South of the Line" mascot appears and shoots him with fireworks, catapulting Hector into the billboard of his business, where he explodes, setting off the other fireworks in his nearby warehouse.

=== Doug "The Doppelganger" Shablowski ===
Doug Shablowski
- First appearance: "Temp Check" (2011)
- Last appearance: "Rigby's Graduation Day Special" (2016) (non-speaking cameo)
- Voiced by: Roger Craig Smith

In-universe information
- Species: Shapeshifter
- Gender: Male
- Occupation: Conman

Douglas "The Doppelganger" Shablowski, or Doug for short (voiced by Roger Craig Smith), is the antagonist in the episode "Temp Check". He is an anthropomorphic otter who is a serial scam artist whose strategy involves presenting himself as a drifter seeking work with the intention of taking over other people's lives, and is hired by Rigby as a temporary employee at the park to perform duties typically assigned to him by Benson. His relationship with Mordecai ends up making Rigby jealous. He eventually becomes a clone of Rigby and even sounds the same. After doing multiple tests with Rigby's favorite things, Mordecai tricks Doug into revealing himself by offering a hug and he accepts (which the real Rigby would never do). Upon realizing that his cover is blown, Doug attempts to flee but is quickly apprehended by Skips and placed in custody by the local authorities for his crimes. It is also revealed that he had been pulling the same scam all over the country. As he is being arrested, Doug, as a sign of good faith, tells Rigby that while he himself does not have much to be thankful for, Rigby has friends, a job, and a home – something the raccoon should not take for granted. He is last seen in the same cell with Mr. Ross when the park is sent into space even after serving over five years, suggesting he received a lengthy prison sentence for all his scandals.

=== Vince and Tommy ===
Vince and Tommy (voiced by Roger Craig Smith and Andrew Kishino respectively) are two businessmen who only appeared in "Party Re-Pete" and work for the mysterious company called "Party Starter" which are disguised to clone party throwing people such as Party Pete. They then attempt to turn Benson into a party machine too when he signs up for a job at their company. After the park gang rescue Benson, Party Pete, and other captured party throwers, the two try to stop them from escaping, but are defeated when Benson feeds the Party Pete a large galleon of soda, causing an explosion that destroys the building. They are then arrested by the police for their crimes.

=== Cube Bros. ===
The Cube Bros. (all voiced by Roger Craig Smith) are the people that turning into robots and the villains in "Cube Bros". They are three drones called Randy, Andy & Gill. Randy has long black hair, a black tie, and a long nose, Andy has a brown beard and hair, with a red tie, and Gill has grey long spiky hair with a brown tie. Randy seems to be an equivalent to Mordecai, and has similarities to J.G. Quintel, Andy is an equivalent to Rigby and Gill is an equivalent to Hi Five Ghost.

=== Park Avenue ===
The Park Avenue (voiced by Troy Baker) is a living spray can who appears in "Under the Hood". His graffiti led to Muscle Man getting fired from his job, forcing Mordecai and Rigby to chase him down and expose his scheme to Benson to get Muscle Man rehired. After surviving his traps and graffiti monsters, they catch him in his invisible house and force him to admit the truth to Benson. When Benson attempts to call the police, he tries to escape but fails.

=== Warlock ===
The Warlock (voiced by James Hong) is the villain in "Fortune Cookie". He is first seen playing cards with Benson, who tries to win back his luck after a series of misfortunes that were prophesied from the fortune of a fortune cookie. However, he gambles away the Park to the warlock, who then opens his fanny pack that sucks everything it gets. When Rigby confesses that in reality he switched fortunes with Benson behind his back, they trade fortunes again. Afterwards, the warlock disappears and everything is back to normal. The Warlock appears in an online game "Battle for the Behemoths" as the boss.

=== Cat Masterson ===
Cat Masterson (voiced by Paul Scheer) is a director at Cat Masterson Studios and the villain in "Cat Videos". He tricks people to act like cats such as Benson wearing a suit when he entered his studio and turned him into Lil Benny, a cat version of himself. When Mordecai and Rigby entered his studio looking for Benson, he tricks them into wearing the same suits into cat versions of themselves and renamed them Stretch and Runty while also trying to turn them into real cats just like Benson. In the end, he is defeated when the duo rescue Benson and damage said his suit, revealing he is also cat and is last seen taken away to the vet.

=== Carrey O'Key ===
Carrey O'Key (voiced by Richard McGonagle) is the manager of Carrey O'Key's, a karaoke bar, and the main antagonist in "Karaoke Video", where the park gang visit his place for the night. When he releases Mordecai and Rigby's embarrassing promo tape without their permission, the duo manage to cut it after the first seconds of the video. As Carrey and his security guard Carl fight Mordecai and Rigby for the tape, the entire club gets involved in the massive brawl but Benson. When the tape gets into his hands, Carrey punches and yells at him for it. Benson then furiously smashes it into Carrey's face, knocking him unconscious and destroying the tape as well. Carrey O'Key and Carl are not seen again later on in the episode, but they make a cameo in "Return of Mordecai and the Rigbys".

=== Underworld Playground Monsters ===
The Underworld Playground Monsters are the group of monsters who lived in the underworld playground and the villains appeared in "Play Date". When Mordecai, CJ and Thomas entered the Underworld Playground, they encounter some Underground Playground Monsters who invade our playground. They give chase to try and kill them, but the three manages to escape from the Underworld. Thomas uses his scare power to make an earthquake like a bridge, killing them for good.

=== Frank Jones ===
Frank Jones (voiced by John Cygan) is the main villain in "Trailer Trashed". Posing as a health inspector, he arrives at the Park. When he takes a look inside Muscle Man's trailer (which Muscle Man won in a hot dog eating contest), he initially plans to take it to the dump, but gives Muscle Man a chance to get it "up to code". However, when Frank shows up again, he gets two of his henchmen to destroy some parts of his trailer, claiming that it was still not "up to code". After Muscle Man refuses to let him take away his trailer, Frank warns that he will return with an army and drives off. Muscle Man then calls his brother Muscle Bro, who brings his truck, as a reinforcement and forms a strategy. As the park workers (except Hi Five Ghost) are pursued by Frank and his henchmen, they are en route to the border, where there was a cliff at the end. After the park gang and Frank's minions are all defeated during the chase, Frank scuffles with Muscle Man in Muscle Bro's truck. When Muscle Man calls him the "most insane health inspector ever", Frank reveals that he is not a real health inspector: he was the runner-up at the hot dog eating contest that Muscle Man won, and he wanted to take the trailer for revenge. Muscle Man gets out of the truck, telling Frank to take it, but not before tying the truck's wheel up with his shirt and removing the brake pedal. Frank Jones reaches the back of the truck where the trailer was to be stored, only to find a sign that it was a prank. He is killed when the truck drives off the edge of the cliff.

=== Christmas Villains ===
==== Quillgin ====
Quillgin
- First appearance: "The Christmas Special" (2012)
- Voiced by: Thomas Haden Church

In-universe information
- Species: Elf
- Gender: Male

Quillgin (voiced by Thomas Haden Church) is an evil elf who resembles a human being and only appears in the "Regular Show Christmas Special". He made a magical present that was so powerful that it can give people anything they want and only lava could destroy it. However, as he used dark magic as a key component, it also turns people evil and he got so angry that he tried to use it to end Christmas forever and kill Santa, but it fails when Santa reveals to be wearing a bulletproof vest and steals the present from Quillgin. After Santa, the park gang, and the rival park team up, Mordecai and Rigby attempt to destroy the present by throwing it into the East Pines lava pit. Quillgin fights Mordecai and Rigby for the present while falling in the volcano and was killed after landing into the lava pit with the magical present. The Christmas Special is a parody of The Lord of the Rings, so Quillgin is a parody of Sauron who was originally an elf before his transformation into the Dark Lord.

==== Polar Bear ====
The Polar Bear (voiced by Fred Tatasciore) is a bear and side boss character who appears in the "Regular Show Christmas Special". In the last trial, Skips translates and states that someone must wrestle a bear. Being a skilled wrestler, Pops challenges the bear, despite protests from the others. Pops is initially overwhelmed by the bear, but he eventually overpowers him and wins. The bear is soon after revealed to be a guardian who said they passed the test. The bear opens a portal in his stomach to allow the group into the lava pit.

==== Celsius Snow Monsters ====
The Celsius Snow Monsters are one of the villains from "Regular Show: Christmas in Space". They are cute and harmless in the day but at night, they become large terrifying monsters.

==== Rocker Caroler ====
The Rocker Caroler (voiced by Roger Craig Smith) is one of the villains from "Regular Show: Christmas in Space". He is a magical caroler who madly desires cookies. After arriving at the park dome and constantly threatening the park gang with his magic, they manage to defeat him by feeding him cookies. Now satisfied with what he had mostly desired, he explodes into snow.

==== Krampus ====
The Krampus (voiced by Fred Tatasciore) is one of the villains from "Regular Show: Christmas in Space". Benson pranks Rigby by calling Krampus due to his misbehavior, but little does he realize that Krampus is real. Upon arriving at the park dome, he attempts to abduct Rigby and later the rest of the park gang when they try to protect Rigby. They eventually defeat him using hand-bells, freeing his trapped victims.

=== Laundry Margaret ===
Laundry Margaret (voiced by Janie Haddad-Tompkins) is the villain in "Laundry Woes". She is a pink hallucination of Margaret who tempts Mordecai into going to return Margaret's sweater after they broke up while ignoring the fact that he should move on. When he attempts to resist, she takes control of Mordecai's mind, making him crash into a statue in front of Margaret's college. She disappears afterwards.

=== Parkie Award Ghosts ===
The Parkie Award Ghosts (voiced by Mark Hamill, Roger Craig Smith, Fred Tatasciore and Ali Hillis) are the villains that appeared in "The Parkie Awards".

=== Promise Pie ===
The Promise Pie (voiced by J. G. Quintel) is the villain in "Pie Contest". He first appears inside a garbage can and lies to Mordecai and Rigby when they ask him to help judge the contest without hurting anyone's feelings (although Mordecai at first refuses his help, as he didn't trust him earlier), but he actually intended on eating everybody instead, making him grow to a gargantuan size and claiming that he was lowering the competition to make judging simpler for them. This forces the duo to tell the truth to everyone, shrinking him down to size. Mordecai ended up smashing him against a garbage truck, killing him for good.

=== Principal Party Horse ===
Principal Party Horse (voiced by John Cygan (original series), Eric Bauza (The Lost Tapes)) is a principal of Party Horse 42699 and villain who lives in Party Horse Public School and appeared in "Party Horse" and "The Return of Party Horse". He first appears in a flashback where he makes the Party Horses take a US History test in order for them to become real Party Horses, however, Party Horse 42699 escapes to Earth. He then follows Party Horse to Earth, where he threatens to blow up Earth if Party Horse doesn't take his test, but gives Party Horse an hour to study. When Party Horse comes to take the test, he makes a video of Party Horse to show students on their home planet, knowing he'll fail. Towards the end of the test, Party Horse's pencil breaks, and Principal tries to stop Rigby from handing him a sharpener. When Party Horse completes the test, he makes the Principal not blow up Earth, whatever the result. He accepts, but is then revealed Party Horse tricked him, and he follows Party Horse back into space.

=== Joanne Hanatronic ===
Joanne Hanatronic (voiced by Minty Lewis) is the main antagonist in "Eileen Flat Screen", it is revealed that Joanne is Eileen's roommate. Joanne is shown to be ill-tempered, domineering and protective of her belongings. She goes as far as to threaten Eileen if she touches her television. When Joanne found out that Rigby moved her TV plug down to plug in Eileen's new flat screen, she got furious, and stole Eileen's TV. She also steals an old man's car to drive to a bridge, so she can throw Eileen's TV off of it. Rigby steals her TV and follows her (with Mordecai and CJ), to the bridge. When Mordecai, Rigby, and CJ catch up to her, she is seen holding the TV above the river below the bridge. Rigby dedicates a speech about how Eileen deserves the TV, but to no avail. Joanne unsuccessfully throws the TV into the river, with Rigby catching it with his whip/rope. When Joanne requests her TV back, the wind causes it to fall into the river. Her family inheritance's lawyer appears, calling her grandfather (voiced by Julian Holloway), much to her dismay. It is revealed that she comes from a wealthy family, and that her TV was the family heirloom, which was the first TV her family's company ever invented. The lawyer also revealed that Joanne was allowed to live her life as a normal person, as long she protected her family's heirloom, and since it was destroyed, she will no longer be able to take over the company. She will no longer be able to stay at Eileen's house, either, and is forced to go back to a wealthy lifestyle.

=== Cash Bankis ===
Cash Bankis (voiced by Phil LaMarr) is the antagonist of "Bank Shot". Cash Bankis has a basketball backboard and net for a head and wears a red hoodie and gray sweatpants. Cash is very good at the game of Bank Shot. Cash first appears when Rigby asks if there's anyone who would like to play Bank Shot against him, Cash requests to plays. The two agree on a wager; the loser pays for the winner's bill. When Cash wins the bet, he shows Rigby the bill – $12,000 for a night of eating gold plated chicken. As Rigby is unable to pay that much, he decides to take the bet up a notch (double or nothing). He bets Cash that he can make "the greatest bank shot of all time" off the wall. He accepts. but only if Rigby passes off his Eggscellent hat as a side deal. When Rigby's guts "fail" him, he steals the hat and demands Rigby to pay up $24,000. Rigby didn't have that kind of money on him, so he threatens his friends to pay the money. This forces Rigby to demand another rematch (triple-or-nothing). Cash gives Rigby until the following day to get prepared. He tells him not only will he pay him the money, but he and his friends will be forbidden to hang out at Wing Kingdom. When Rigby is fully prepared, the two meet up at Wing Kingdom again and begin the rematch. After Cash makes his first successful shot, Rigby makes his successful shot. They go at each other with amazing bank shots, until Cash fails one. Rigby makes another shot, and wins the triple-or-nothing bet. That meant Cash had to pay for his own bill, and Rigby asked for his hat back. Cash said he won the hat fair and square on the side deal. Then, the God of Basketball appeared and told Rigby his double or nothing bet was still in play. It's revealed that Rigby's ball continued to bank after going out the window. It returns to Wing Kingdom, and bounces the hat off Cash's head before going through the hoop. Which meant Rigby truly made the greatest bank shot of all time.

=== Hurl, Merle, and Burl ===
Hurl Hurlbutt, Merle, and Burl (voiced by Roger Craig Smith, Matthew Yang King and Troy Baker respectively) are a trio of brawny surfers and the main antagonists in "Catching the Wave". Pops first encounters them at a beach when he was learning how to surf, and is made fun of by them. The trio become more hostile toward him after he accidentally collides into them in an unsuccessful attempt to surf. Many scenes later, they appear again at the Park lake, where a wave machine was installed for Pops to practice surfing, turning violent on Pops. When the park gang fend off the surfers in a paddle boat, the trio call for reinforcements. While the groundskeepers defend him, Pops goes to ride the wave, but Hurl cranks the machine up to its highest level before the rest of the park gang stop him. After Pops successfully rides it, Hurl Hurlbutt and his friends are crushed by some dolphins from Pops's newfound bond with nature, seemingly killing them.

=== Snowballs the Ice Monster ===
Snowballs (vocal effects by Mark Hamill) is a giant snow monster can breathe fire (despite the fact that it is made of ice) who appears in "Appreciation Day". It is brought to life by Mordecai and Rigby after they foolishly write lies in the book of park records. The monster steals the book and rips out its pages while wreaking havoc in the park. Although the duo manage to collect all the pages, Snowballs still had the book's cover, which is needed to defeat the monster. Skips and Rigby both manage to retrieve the cover from Snowballs, allowing Mordecai to write an ending to make Snowballs disappear and everything go back to normal. Snowballs appears in an online game, "Battle for the Behemoths" as a boss.

=== Stress Monster ===
The stress monster (vocal effects by David Kaye) is a five-headed monster who appears in "Skips Stress". It is formed after Skips rings an ancient stress bell to remove his, along with Benson, Pops, Mordecai, and Rigby's stress, with each head resembling the five. They prove to be no match for the monster until Skips points out that they must cut off all of its heads to kill it. They succeed in cutting off all but one head, which Skips kills with a sharp flagpole.

=== Party Pete ===
Peter "Party Pete" Hermanverfal (voiced by Jeff Bennett) is the antagonist of the episode "Party Pete" and a dueter-protagonist in "Party Re-Pete", who talks with a German accent. He is invited by Mordecai and Rigby to spice up their party. After learning Benson was returning to the park, Mordecai and Rigby tried to stop Party Pete, who was hopped up on Radi-Cola. Eventually, Mordecai and Rigby stuff him with so much cola that he explodes to death just before Benson arrives. It is revealed that Pete was one of the many people to be captured by Party Planners and be cloned for parties, meaning that the Party Pete that died was only a clone. The Party Pete Clone made an appearance as one of the resurrected villains in "Exit 9B".

=== Drumatron VI ===
The Drumatron VI is a special machine and the main antagonist in "150 Piece Kit". It is Benson's replacement to the band Hair to the Throne. During the concert, Mordecai and Rigby tied the Drumatron to prevent him from performing the solo, but when Benson tries to prove to everyone that he can play the drum solo, the Drumatron's top detaches, and tries to stop Benson from finishing the solo. While close to finishing the solo, it tries one final attempt to stop Benson but he manages to overpower it and finish the solo.

==== Hair to the Throne ====
The Hair to the Throne (voiced by Roger Craig Smith, Mark Hamill, and William Salyers) are a hair metal band. Benson was formerly part of the band, but due to his "legendary drum solo" performance on their first album, he was fired, for if anyone knew of his role he would achieve the most fame out of the four members. His replacement is the machine known as the "Drumatron VI". In "150 Piece Kit", the Hair to the Throne are scheduled to perform a concert at the Park. Benson plans to perform the solo again at the concert, and takes his drum kit to the park, where it is destroyed by the Hair to the Throne but Mordecai and Rigby help him fix and set it up during the concert. During Benson's performance, the Drumatron VI and the other band members attempt to stop him, but he overpowers the Drumatron and finished the performance. Afterwards, the Hair to the Throne apologize to Benson for their past actions, and ask him to rejoin them, which he declines.

=== Grease Monster ===
The Grease Monster is the main antagonist in "Gut Model". After Muscle Man puts plates, utensils and a microphone in the fry vat, he seemed to be unstoppable when encountered and spat out a frying liquid. He only be stopped by being attacked with bread crumbs. Muscle Man was able to jump toward it for everyone to get to safety, although he got severe burns.

=== Wall Buddy ===
Wall Buddy is a wall product who appears in "Wall Buddy". Rigby buys it to separate the bedroom, but after he and Mordecai abuse it, it gets too confused and begins to spread across the park, but the duo manage to catch it and hit the reset button, turning it off and returning it to normal. Wall Buddy is not technically evil and its destructive nature is only caused by Mordecai and Rigby overstressing it.

=== Bouncer ===
The Bouncer (voiced by Mark Hamill) is the owner of the club and the villain in "Guitar of Rock".

=== Ladonna ===
Ladonna (voiced by Natasha Leggero) is the owner of a dance club who first appears in "Access Denied". Mordecai and Rigby go to her club, but are kicked out after Mordecai criticizes the club members for their arrogance. Ladonna also makes a cameo in "The Thanksgiving Special" and "Return of Mordecai and the Rigbys".

=== Moon Monster ===
The Moon Monster (vocal effects by Mark Hamill) is a hybrid monster who only appears in the episode "The Power" After Rigby sends several items to the moon, including "a bunch of baby ducks", and a soda machine that doesn't work using a magic keyboard called the Power. He also sends the Moon Monster there. After the park gang are accidentally sent to the moon, the monster proceeds to attack them, until Rigby uses "hamboning" to help them escape. The monster runs after the gang and unsuccessfully attempts to kill them as they use the Power to escape back home. The Moon Monster appears in the online games, Just a Regular Game and Power Keys.

=== Doom Ma Geddon ===
Doom Ma Geddon, commonly known as Error 220 which was formerly called Error 219, is an evil computer virus who appears in the episode "Skips vs. Technology", having resided in Mordecai and Rigby's computer. As Techmo tries to eliminate him, Doom Ma Geddon takes over Techmo's body and tries to kill Mordecai, Rigby, and Skips. He can disintegrate anything his body touches by turning said objects into cubes. He is ultimately defeated when Mordecai and Rigby open up too many programs on the computer, slowing him down. This enables Skips to smash the computer with a sledgehammer, thus destroying the computer and Doom Ma Geddon at the same time and freeing Techmo from the virus's control.

== Other characters ==
=== Muscle Bro/John Sorrenstein ===
John "Muscle Bro" Sorrenstein (voiced by Steven Blum) is a truck driver who is also Muscle Man's elder brother. He's made appearances in "My Mom", "Trucker Hall of Fame" (once before his father's funeral, and once during a flashback sequence), "Trailer Trashed", "The End of Muscle Man", and in "Terror Tales of the Park IV".

=== Muscle Dad ===
Muscle Dad
- Regular Show character
- First appearance: "Trucker Hall of Fame" (2012)
- Last appearance: "Dumped At The Altar" (2015) (cameo)
- Created by: Toby Jones; Calvin Wong
- Designed by: Toby Jones
- Voiced by: Fred Tatasciore

In-universe information
- Species: Pig-nosed humanoid (before death); Ghost (after death)
- Gender: Male
- Spouse: Muscle Mom
- Children: Muscle Bro & Muscle Man (sons)
- Nationality: American

"Muscle Dad" Sorrenstein (voiced by Fred Tatasciore) is Muscle Man's deceased father who died after unloading a box on to a bear by accident. He always wanted to make Muscle Man proud of him and lied about being a forklift driver and told Muscle Man that he was a trucker ever since Muscle Man was a kid. He was a good prankster and a great dad. He made his ultimate prank by leaving Muscle Man a note after his death, the note asked Muscle Man to spread his trucker hat ashes over the Trucker Hall of Fame and said that it was his last wish and final prank from beyond the grave. Muscle Man completes the task with the help of Mordecai and Rigby, and he comes back and saves them from the ghosts of famous truckers. He made post-death appearances in the episodes "Trucker Hall of Fame" and "The Thanksgiving Special". He also appears in "Power Tower".

=== Quips/Quintin Quippenger ===
Quintin Q. "Quips" Quippenger (voiced by Matt Price) is Skips's cousin who appeared in "Quips" and "Bachelor Party! Zingo!". He is also engaged. Quips is often found saying his catchphrase "Zingo!" When Quips is invited to game night by Skips to hang out with the guys Quips annoys everyone with his childlike jokes. This gets so bad that after almost everyone gets offended Reggie throws a temper tantrum and almost destroys the seven layer dip. After this, Skips suggests that Quips does his routine at a kids show and it works out great. Quips makes his appearance in a few episodes and has inspired a fan base for his famous catchphrase, "Zingo!"

=== Carty ===
Hecho En "Carty" Mexico (voiced by Toby Jones), is the golf cart Mordecai and Rigby use as their way of transportation. His most distinctive appearance was when Mordecai and Rigby accidentally bring him to life (with soda spilled over his engine) while having to replace him in "Out of Commission". After doing many activities, Carty dives into sea with fireworks firing from his trunk as a final activity to do before going to the dump. After finding out he was going to stay (due to Benson being unable to afford the new cart thanks to an accounting error), Mordecai and Rigby fished him out, repaired him, and drove him back. After these events, Carty could no longer speak or move by himself. He mistakenly believes that his name is "Hecho En Mexico" because that's what is written on him ("Hecho en Mexico" means "Made in Mexico" in Spanish and is actually meant to indicate where the cart was manufactured).

=== Johnny Skydiver ===
Johnny Skydiver (voiced by Steve Blum) is a skydiver and a friend of Muscle Man who flies the airplane and lives on an airfield and appeared in Rigby in the Sky with Burrito.

=== Suit ===
An outfit which is simply called Suit (voiced by Dean Cameron) is a suit-like cybernetic talking exo-suit that Benson wears in "Benson's Suit". He was created by his father, a tailor, to serve an evil boss like Rich Steve. His father refused to accept $10 since it was not enough, so Rich took the suit by force and killed his father along with Rich's guards. He later escaped from Rich after his father died, until Benson found him and wore it without knowing who the suit was. Thought it was an ordinary suit and quickly gets dirty when Benson stained it. The next day, the suit cleaned himself suddenly and appeared in front of Benson. He later revealed to Benson who he was and praised Benson as a worthy boss. He then claimed that he would help him to manage slackers like Mordecai and Rigby. When Rich Steve found him, the suit and Benson fought back and defeated Rich Steve. In the end, knowing so many evil bosses are still after him, he tells Benson to "wash" him in the washing machine in Inferno Mode to destroy him, but before he is "washed" for the greater good of peaceful kind, they admit that they will never forget their times together.

=== Mona ===
Desdemona "Mona" (voiced by Grey DeLisle), was Skips' girlfriend who knew him in the 19th century under his former name Walks. She appeared in "Diary", "Exit 9B", and had a major role in "Skips' Story". When Walks transferred to her school, she heard his plans of trying to defeat Klorgbane and tried to keep her distance from him. Eventually, the two become a couple, only for Klorgbane to accidentally kill her in a fight he was having with Walks.

=== Muscle Mom/Monique Sorrenstein ===
Monique "Muscle Mom" Sorrenstein (voiced by Edie McClurg) is a middle-aged woman who is constantly referenced in many of Muscle Man's jokes. Her first appearance is in "Terror Tales of the Park IV" and her last appearance was in "Dumped At The Altar".

=== John ===
John (voiced by Roger Craig Smith) is Margaret's cousin who has a prosthetic leg. He appears in "Yes Dude Yes" and "Family BBQ".

=== Headmaster Bennett ===
Headmaster Bennett (voiced by Sam Marin) is the headmaster of Skips' old high school. He is similar to Benson and appeared in the episode "Skips' Story".

=== Hillary and William ===
Hillary (voiced by Jennifer Hale in the first appearance, Katey Sagal in later appearances) and William (voiced by Alastair Duncan in the first appearance, Ed Begley Jr. in later appearances) are Mordecai's middle-aged parents. They first appeared on The Thanksgiving Special.

=== Barbara and Sherm ===
Barbara (voiced by Courtenay Taylor in the first two appearances, Ali Hillis in later appearances) and Sherm (voiced by William Salyers in the first appearance, Eddie Pepitone in later appearances) are Rigby's middle-aged parents. They first appeared on The Thanksgiving Special. Not much is known about Rigby's parents, but they seem very proud of Rigby, even though he is lazy and rarely gets things done. When Rigby was in high school, he was expelled and his mother had to come pick him up. She was upset and tells him that "You're always making so much trouble for yourself". Whenever Sherm yells, makes fun of Rigby, or talks to Don, Barbara sometimes defends Rigby. In "Rigby Goes to the Prom" It is shown that he highly favors his younger son, Don, over Rigby, and thinks that Rigby is a loser and a screw up who messed up him and his family's lives to make up for his own short comings. Rigby manages to maneuver Sherm's prized car to the bottom of a mountain after Sherm lost control while driving and nearly went over a cliff (which he blamed on Rigby), confronting his dad about how even though he's getting his GED and bettering himself, that he still won't trust him and he cares more about his car and younger son than his first son. Afterwards, he appeared to have more respect for Rigby.

However, unknown to his parents, Rigby had more experiences involving more dangerous situations to survive in than Don, until they finally acknowledged him, particularly on their elder son's graduation speech about the situations he was in. As they were heading to the party, they saw the park going up into space and worriedly watch their elder son go up.

=== Stef ===
Stef is a bat woman who appears in the series finale. Mordecai met her while working in art school and they married and had kids.

=== Andy ===
Andy (voiced by Sean Szeles) is the older brother of the Baby Ducks. He first appears in "Brilliant Century Duck Crisis Special", where he joins the battle between his brothers and the Geese in combiners. He re-appears in "A Regular Epic Final Battle Part 2" where he tries to join the battle against Anti-Pops and Streaming, but is too late to do so.

=== Simon and Mikey ===
Simon and Mikey (voiced by Roger Craig Smith) are two kids who appear in "High Score". They are experienced with the game "Broken Bonez", and disrespect Mordecai and Rigby until they beat their high score. They appear again in "Terror Tales of the Park III", when Benson encounters them after they egg Skips's house. One of the kids make a cameo in "Happy Birthday Song Contest". Although they are never called by their names in the show, their names appear on the credits of "High Score".

=== Jeremy and Chad ===
Jeremy and Chad (both voiced by Roger Craig Smith) are an ostrich and possum respectively who appear in "Replaced". Mordecai and Rigby attempt to sabotage them to ensure that Benson doesn't replace them, leading to massive brawl on the lake. Benson stops the fighting, quickly has Mordecai and Rigby fired and makes them leave before offering Chad and Jeremy the job. They turn it down due to what they had been through and leave, much to Benson's dismay. This also allows Mordecai and Rigby (who didn't actually leave the park) to keep their jobs. The duo may also both suffer with anger management issues, where they become very hostile to Mordecai and Rigby, using violence as their first resort against them when they begin to interfere in their job. They later make a cameo appearance in "Every Meat Burritos". Their names are a reference to the band Chad & Jeremy.

=== Lake Monsters ===
The Lake Monsters only appear in the episode "Replaced" where they help Mordecai and Rigby sabotage Chad and Jeremy's chores. One of the monsters later starts a fight between them. They also appear in the online game "All Nighter" (with their designs being slightly altered) where they serve as obstacles.

=== Jack Farley ===
Jack Farley (voiced by Mark Hamill) is a man who appears to be a businessman, who first appears in "High Score" when he respects Mordecai and Rigby after they beat him in "Broken Bonez". He also made a cameo in "That's My Television".

=== Gregg ===
Gregg (voiced by Sam Marin) is a man who is first appeared in "Caveman". He was a caveman when Mordecai and Rigby found him in the cave, but when he was fully civilized, he basically became a human. Before being tested by Benson, Gregg asked the two if he could meet his old girlfriend Diane (voiced by Courtney Taylor). When they agreed, she ended up releasing the rest of the cavemen, and they destroyed most of the park. However, Mordecai, Rigby, and Gregg lead the tribe back to the meat locker, where Gregg and his tribe ended up getting frozen once again.

=== Leon ===
Leon (voiced by Steve Blum) is a homeless person and the park manager before Benson who appears in "Benson Be Gone". After Benson was fired by Susan, the new park manager, he met Leon. But when he is disgusted by Leon's careless lifestyle, he returns to the Park. Later, Leon sacrifices himself by driving into Susan in her giant form and ripping off the heels of her shoes, killing her too.

=== Principal Dean ===
Principal Dean (voiced by David Koechner) is the principal of West Anderson High School. He first appeared in Regular Show: The Movie. He is a person with little patience and easily upset as Benson. He has been shown a calmer side during his appearance in Season 7. Rigby's laziness is the reason why he is frustrated at him as similar to Mordecai, because both characters end up being frustrated at Rigby because of his laziness causing him to be failing science with Mr. Ross as his teacher.

=== Mr. Sengley ===
Mr. Sengley (voiced by Roger Craig Smith) is a ceremony announcer who first appears in "Bad Portrait", "The Parkie Awards" and "Chili Cook-Off".

=== Francis Jablonski ===
Francis Jablonski (voiced by Roger Craig Smith) is a former student and a substitute gym coach of West Anderson High School and older brother of Aiden Jablonski and the former nemesis of Rigby. He made his first appearance in Regular Show: The Movie.

=== Benny Harris ===
Benny Harris (voiced by Chris Cox) was a character in "Bad Portrait". Harris is first shown as Mordecai watches a television program, Painting is Great with Benny Harris, as "inspirational" material for drawing Benson's self-portrait. Harris reappears seemingly as a ghost during Mordecai and Rigby's fight between the animated, incomplete Benson drawings to assist them in battle. He suggests using paint to eradicate the alive "Bensons", which successfully destroys the Bensons in turn by dirtying Mordecai's self-portrait of Benson. The current fate of Benny Harris's phantom is unknown. Benny Harris is a parody of the late artist, Bob Ross.

=== Carl Putter ===
Carl Putter (voiced by Christopher Mcdonald) is CJ's father who appeared in "Daddy Issues". When CJ was young, Carl would take her out to play mini golf with him. However, she did not take the game as seriously. He would often pressure her to try harder, and sometimes when trying to make a hole in one, he wouldn't let her win. He'd brag about it in front of her face, making her feel bad. During the Junior Championship Mini Golf Tournament, Carl pressured CJ to not mess up, and when she made her shot just up to the obstacle, he scolded her for trying to "play it safe". That was when she decided to quit playing minigolf. Years later, Carl learned his daughter won the Sink Hole ide Queso challenge, and was going to compete in the Putter Palooza. He joins in so he can beat her. They both made excellent shots, and were both eventually neck-in-neck for first place. As a result, they had to take the sudden-death putt-off. After missing the final hole and preparing to flee the demons that appeared to attack him and CJ, he has a change of heart when CJ stands her ground and alongside Mordecai, helps defend CJ as she hits the final hole. Afterwards, he congratulates his daughter and apologizes for the verbal abuse and constant golf beatings he put her through, saying it was the only way he knew to prepare her for the world.

=== The Eggscellent Knight ===
The Eggscellent Knight (voiced by Jeff Bennett) is a character who first appeared in "Eggscellent", where he protected the Eggscellent Hat. He also appeared later in "Gamers Never Say Die", as the guardian of a golden game stamp. He once again appears in "Garage Door" as an employee of Hardware Emporium. He also made a cameo appearance in “Ace Balthazar Lives” when he tried to join the party was knocked out. He made his final appearance in “The Ice Tape” where he guards three tapes that would reveal Pops's destiny. He is a parody of the Grail Knight from Indiana Jones and the Last Crusade.

=== Spacey McSpaceTree ===
Spacey McSpaceTree (voiced by Steve Little) is a minor character in Regular Show. He made his debut in the Season Eight episodes "Spacey McSpaceTree" and "Space Escape". He is the mascot of the Space Tree Station and he was put into cryo-sleep for 30 years.

=== Turtles ===
The Turtles (voiced by John Cygan) are a group of turtles who is first appeared in "I See Turtles".

=== Bird Greeter ===
Bird Greeter (voiced by Dee Bradley Baker) is a minor character in Regular Show. He made his debut in the Season Eight episode "New Beds" He is the mascot of the UMÄK. He greeted the guys at the UMÄK store and resembles Big Bird from Sesame Street.
