= Regular Show season 8 =

Regular Show
- Season 8
- Region 4 DVD cover
- Showrunner: J. G. Quintel
- Starring: J. G. Quintel; William Salyers; Sam Marin; Mark Hamill; Minty Lewis
- No. of episodes: 27

Release
- Original network: Cartoon Network
- Original release: September 26, 2016 – January 16, 2017

Season chronology
- ← Previous; Season 7 Next → The Lost Tapes

The eighth and final season of the American animated comedy television series Regular Show (promoted as Regular Show in Space), created by J. G. Quintel, originally aired on Cartoon Network in the United States. Quintel created the series' pilot using characters from his comedy shorts for the canceled anthology series The Cartoonstitute. He developed Regular Show from his own experiences in college. Simultaneously, several of the show's main characters originated from his animated shorts The Naïve Man from Lolliland and 2 in the AM PM. The series was renewed for an eighth and final season on July 7, 2015. The season ran from September 26, 2016, to January 16, 2017, and was produced by Cartoon Network Studios.

Taking place shortly after the seventh season finale, Mordecai and Rigby along with rest of the park itself eventually find themselves in space, where they must learn to adapt to their newfound surroundings all while getting into the same comedic antics as with the previous seasons. The season later progresses to being narrative-driven once the crew ends up confronting Pops's brother Anti-Pops, a cataclysmic being, forcing them to uncover the truth behind Pops's past.

The series finale included a reference to Quintel's original short "The Naive Man from Lolliland", in which Pops's original design is created. The episodes "Can You Ear Me Now?" and "The Ice Tape" feature the final voice performances of both John Cygan, who died on May 13, 2017, and David Ogden Stiers, who died on March 3, 2018.

== Development ==
=== Production ===
The series was renewed for an eighth season on July 7, 2015, along with many other Cartoon Network shows. Regular Show is one of two Cartoon Network series ever to get an eighth season, the other being Adventure Time. The release date was announced at San Diego Comic-Con, and the season premiered on September 26, 2016. In March 2016, Kacie Hermanson was announced as the new main character designer for the season, replacing long-time designer Ben Adams, who left the show after the sixth episode of the season to work on Billy Dilley's Super-Duper Subterranean Summer for Disney XD. Calvin Wong served as supervising director for the season. The story writers for the season are Quintel, Sean Szeles, Gina Ippolito, Patrick Baker, and Matt Price, who is also the story editor, while being produced by Cartoon Network Studios. Szeles also served as supervising producer, while Ryan Slater served as producer. A former writer and storyboard artist Andres Salaff briefly returned to work on the final episode.

After production on the series wrapped up, several crew members continued to work with Quintel on his next series, Close Enough. On June 12, 2024, Warner Bros. Discovery announced that a new series featuring some characters from Regular Show had been greenlit, with Quintel returning as showrunner. The series was soon revealed to be titled Regular Show: The Lost Tapes and premiered worldwide on May 11, 2026.

== Episodes ==
No. overall	No. in season	Title	Animation direction by	Written and storyboarded by	Original release date	Prod. code	U.S. viewers (millions)
218	1	"One Space Day at a Time"	Robert Alvarez	Owen Dennis and Sean Glaze	September 26, 2016	1043-234	1.14
After the events of "Rigby's Graduation Day Special", the Park crew must formulate a plan to survive in space and how to live in it.
219	2	"Cool Bro Bots"	Robert Alvarez	Benton Connor and Sam Spina	September 26, 2016	1043-235	1.14
The crew has an encounter with "brobots" whose purpose is to serve others, but Mordecai and Rigby are suspicious of them.
220	3	"Welcome to Space"	Robert Alvarez	Madeline Queripel and Alex Cline	September 27, 2016	1043-236	0.96
After learning their true mission in space, the crew is excited to make history, but Benson still wants to return home.
221	4	"Space Creds"	Robert Alvarez	Casey Crowe and Gideon Chase	September 27, 2016	1043-237	0.96
Mordecai and Rigby volunteer to rescue a scientist's ex-husband in exchange for space creds so they can buy hover shoes.
222	5	"Lost and Found"	Robert Alvarez	Minty Lewis and Ryan Pequin	September 28, 2016	1043-239	0.96
Chance Sureshot loses his wallet and is enclosed in a robot's bubble until he can pay for his food. To free him, Mordecai, Rigby, Toothpick Sally, and Recap Robot must travel to the Mantis Planet to get it back.
223	6	"Ugly Moons"	Robert Alvarez	Benton Connor and Sam Spina	September 29, 2016	1043-240	0.98
To get back at the Bush Station, Colonel Rawls hires Muscle Man to prank them.
224	7	"The Dream Warrior"	Robert Alvarez	Madeline Queripel and Alex Cline	September 30, 2016	1043-241	1.09
When Pops continues to have nightmares of an extraterrestrial creature asking for his address, the gang tries to help him. Guest voices: Armin Shimerman as The Nightmare Alien, Robert Englund as Anti-Pops
225	8	"The Brain of Evil"	Robert Alvarez	Owen Dennis and Sean Glaze	October 3, 2016	1043-238	0.82
Mordecai and Rigby must stop an evil brain after Rigby releases it from a cage. Guest voices: Wallace Shawn as The Evil Brain
226	9	"Fries Night"	Robert Alvarez	Casey Crowe and Gideon Chase	October 4, 2016	1043-242	0.95
After getting dumped by Pam, Benson goes looking for French Fries ingredients with a female asteroid named Roxy. Guest voices: Kate Micucci as Roxy
227	10	"Spacey McSpaceTree"	Robert Alvarez and Brian Sheesley	Benton Connor and Sam Spina	October 5, 2016	1043-243	1.04
Colonel Rawls puts Rigby through safety training by pairing him with the unbearable Spacey McSpaceTree.
228	11	"Can You Ear Me Now?"	Robert Alvarez and Brian Sheesley	Madeline Queripel and Alex Cline	October 6, 2016	1043-246	0.92
Mordecai and Rigby must go to court after accidentally creating a barrage of sounds on a planet entirely inhabited by sensitive ears.
229	12	"Stuck in an Elevator"	Robert Alvarez and Brian Sheesley	Casey Crowe and Gideon Chase	October 7, 2016	1043-247	0.95
Mordecai and Rigby see Fist Pump perform at the Tree Station but get stuck in a space elevator while traveling to the top.
230	13	"The Space Race"	Robert Alvarez	Owen Dennis and Sean Glaze	October 10, 2016	1043-248	0.93
Mordecai and Rigby have to beat the Space Bush station in a dangerous race.
231	14	"Operation Hear No Evil"	Robert Alvarez	Minty Lewis and Ryan Pequin	October 11, 2016	1043-249	0.91
Mordecai and Rigby try to avoid spoilers of their favorite show, but Benson wants to spoil it to get revenge on them for forgetting to vacuum the house.
232	15	"Space Escape"	Robert Alvarez	Benton Connor and Sam Spina	October 12, 2016	1043-250	0.84
A mysterious new enemy, Anti-Pops, is after Pops forcing everyone on the Space Tree Station to evacuate.
233	16	"New Beds"	Robert Alvarez	Madeline Queripel and Alex Cline	October 13, 2016	1043-251	1.15
After escaping Anti-Pops, the gang makes a quick stop to buy new beds only to encounter a bounty hunter who is after Pops.
234	17	"Mordeby and Rigbecai"	Robert Alvarez	Casey Crowe and Gideon Chase	October 14, 2016	1043-252	0.88
Mordecai and Rigby's butts get swapped after playing with a teleportation machine. Over time, the swapping spreads to other features, so they enlist Muscle Man for help.
235	18	"Alpha Dome"	Brian Sheesley and Robert Alvarez	Owen Dennis and Sean Glaze	October 20, 2016	1043-253	0.99
The Park crew encounters the Alpha Dome, the first dome sent into space. When the crew goes to investigate, they find that its inhabitants believe that it is 1690.
236	19	"Terror Tales of the Park VI" (Note: This is a half-hour episode.)	Robert Alvarez and Brian Sheesley	Sean Glaze ("Fear Planet"), Owen Dennis ("King-Sized Candy Bars"), Minty Lewis and Ryan Pequin ("Alien Roommate")	October 27, 2016 (Note: This episode was first released online on October 15, 2016.)	1043-244; 1043-245	1.05
The Park crew encounter a black hole whilst telling stories on Halloween. • "Fear Planet" - The gang make a quick stop on a planet that brings their greatest fears to life. • "King-Sized Candy Bars" - While Trick or Treating on the Space Tree Station, the gang encounter a house full of vampires. • "Alien Roommate" - In a parody of the Alien franchise, the crew must deal with an obnoxious new roommate. Guest voices: Neil deGrasse Tyson as himself
237	20	"The Ice Tape"	Robert Alvarez	Madeline Queripel and Alex Cline	November 3, 2016	1043-256	0.92
The gang must travel to an ancient VCR that will play a VHS tape made of ice so that they can learn Pops' origins.
238	21	"The Key to the Universe"	Robert Alvarez	Casey Crowe and Gideon Chase	November 10, 2016	1043-257	1.02
Earl, an ancient sensei, begins training Pops for his fight with Anti-Pops, but Pops is unsure if he can or should go along with it.
239	22	"No Train No Gain"	Robert Alvarez	Owen Dennis and Sean Glaze	November 17, 2016	1043-258	0.99
Earl begins training Pops through the technique of the training montage which allows trainers to bend space and time while leveling up. Mordecai and Rigby use one of their songs to help Pops and end up trapping the Park crew in a montage. Song: "Through the Fire and Flames" by DragonForce
240	23	"Christmas in Space"	Robert Alvarez and Brian Sheesley	Minty Lewis, Ryan Pequin, Benton Connor, and Sam Spina	December 1, 2016	1043-254A; 1043-254B	0.92
The gang celebrate Christmas in space and decide to tell stories while opening presents, but Benson keeps trying to insert his love for hand bells. • Skips' Story - In a parody of Pitch Black, the crew stop by an ice planet to have fun in the snow, but get attacked by large yeti creatures. • Benson's First Story - A supernatural, guitar-playing caroler terrorizes the crew by attacking them with the twelve days of Christmas. • Mordecai and Rigby's Story - Mordecai and Rigby forget to get a gift for Pops, so they need to go to the "Theoretical Mall" which is located in another dimension. • Benson's Second Story - The crew get a visit from the Krampus. Song: "Christmas Eve/Sarajevo 12/24" by Savatage (later re-released by Trans-Siberian Orchestra)
241	24	"Kill 'Em with Kindness"	Robert Alvarez and Jeff Hall	Minty Lewis and Ryan Pequin	January 14, 2017 (Note: This episode was first released online on December 19, 2016.)	1043-259	1.08
Despite all of his training, Pops still does not want to fight, so he sets up a meeting with Anti-Pops to settle things peacefully.
242	25	"Meet the Seer"	Robert Alvarez and Jeff Hall	Benton Connor and Sam Spina	January 14, 2017 (Note: This episode was first released online on December 19, 2016.)	1043-260	1.08
The crew arrive on Planet Nielsen where they are reunited with the Guardians of Obsolete Formats and meet the Seer who has been watching them since the very beginning. Guest Voices: Trevor Devall as HD DVD, Gillian Jacobs as Blu-ray, Yvette Nicole Brown as The Seer and Keith David as Streaming
243	26	"Cheer Up Pops"	Robert Alvarez and Jeff Hall	Casey Crowe and Gideon Chase	January 16, 2017	1043-261	1.33
Before arriving at Lolliland, Pops becomes despondent due to his impending battle. The crew then tries to cheer him up by recording their memories. Guest Voices: Trevor Devall as HD DVD and Gillian Jacobs as Blu-ray
244	27	"A Regular Epic Final Battle" (Note: This is a special extended 33-minute episode.)	Robert Alvarez, Richard Collado and Jeff Hall	Minty Lewis, Ryan Pequin, Andres Salaff, Benton Connor, Owen Dennis, Alex Cline, Madeline Queripel, Sam Spina, and J. G. Quintel	January 16, 2017	1043-262; 1043-264A; 1043-264B	1.37
The crew arrive at Lolliland early, so they set up traps for Anti-Pops. Things seem to go off smoothly, but Anti-Pops is unfazed by their futile attempts. Allies from both sides rally together for the epic fight. However, Pops and Anti-Pops are once again at a stalemate. Mordecai and Rigby are forced to jump between the two factions after time resets. They relive the first episode, but soon realize that they need to help Pops, so they use the Power to go back. Pops realizes that he must reach out to Anti-Pops and finally saves the universe at the cost of his life. The entire park crew returns home to their friends and family. After erecting a memorial statue of Pops, a montage shows what happened to the park crew after their adventure in space: Mordecai quits his job at the park, becomes a painter, and meets a woman (a female bat); Rigby marries and has children with Eileen; Muscle Man and Starla move into a nicer trailer and have more children; Benson reunites with Pam the scientist, the two raise four cats and a pig, and Benson becomes park owner after Mr. Maellard's death; High Five Ghost reunites with his human girlfriend, Celia, and the two become popular party DJs in Prague; and Skips is still single and working at the park, only now, he wears shorts instead of jeans. Twenty-five years later, the entire crew return and Mordecai and Rigby reflect on Pops' sacrifice and how immature they used to be before deciding to play some old arcade games. The scene pans out with Pops watching his friends' lives from Heaven. He ejects a VHS tape labeled "Regular Show". He says "Jolly good show" for one last time and the series concludes. Song: "'Heroes'" by David Bowie Guest Animator: James Baxter
