= Regular Show season 7 =

Regular Show
- Season 7
- Region 4 DVD cover
- Showrunner: J. G. Quintel
- Starring: J. G. Quintel; William Salyers; Sam Marin; Mark Hamill
- No. of episodes: 36

Release
- Original network: Cartoon Network
- Original release: June 26, 2015 – June 30, 2016

Season chronology
- ← Previous; Season 6 Next → Season 8

The seventh and penultimate season of the American animated comedy television series Regular Show, created by J. G. Quintel, originally aired on Cartoon Network in the United States, and was produced by Cartoon Network Studios. Quintel created the series' pilot using characters from his comedy shorts for the canceled anthology series The Cartoonstitute. He developed Regular Show from his own experiences in college. Simultaneously, several of the show's main characters originated from his animated shorts The Naïve Man from Lolliland and 2 in the AM PM. The series was renewed for a seventh season on July 25, 2014, ahead of its sixth-season premiere. The previous season contained 28 episodes to accommodate the film, and this season contained 36 episodes.

The first episode of the seventh season, "Dumptown U.S.A.", aired on June 26, 2015, as a "season sneak preview". The seventh season officially premiered on August 6, 2015.

== Development ==
=== Production ===
The series was officially renewed for a seventh season on July 25, 2014, at San Diego Comic-Con. Regular Show and Adventure Time are the first Cartoon Network series to be renewed for a seventh season. Toby Jones announced on June 21, 2015, that the previous season would only contain 31 episodes because of the production of the upcoming movie and that season seven would have 40 episodes, making "Dumptown U.S.A." the season premiere, with the rest of the season officially beginning later in the year. For the whole season, the story writers were Quintel, Sean Szeles, Michele Cavin, and Matt Price, who was also the story editor, while being produced by Cartoon Network Studios. It was the last season for Calvin Wong as writer/storyboard artist, as his last episode was "Win That Prize," and he became a supervising director as of the episode "Benson's Pig." It was also the last season for Jones as writer/storyboard artist, leaving the show to become the supervising director for OK K.O.! Let's Be Heroes shorts. Szeles served as supervising producer and Ryan Slater as a producer. This was the last season where John Infantino, previously the supervising director for seasons 2 through 6, wrote for the show (leaving after "The Dome Experiment Special," though "Terror Tales of the Park V" was aired out of order). This was also the last season for writer Michele Cavin (who left at the end of the season to write for Pickle and Peanut, Future-Worm!, and Amphibia).

During a press interview by Bubbleblabber, Quintel confirmed that during the season, a special "wintery-themed" episode would air later in the year and that the season seven finale would be a half-hour special titled "Rigby's Graduation Day Special" that would change the course of the series.

== Episodes ==
No. overall	No. in season	Title	Animation direction by	Written and storyboarded by	Original release date	Prod. code	U.S. viewers (millions)
182	1	"Dumptown U.S.A."	Robert Alvarez	Benton Connor and Sam Spina	June 26, 2015	1035-195	1.29
Two weeks after the events of "Dumped at the Altar", Mordecai disappears to a mysterious city called Dumptown, populated by men who live a trashy and aimless lifestyle after being dumped. Either Rigby has to find him or Mordecai will be fired by Benson. Note: This is a season sneak preview.
183	2	"The Parkie Awards"	Robert Alvarez	Madeline Queripel and Alex Cline	August 6, 2015	1035-196	1.60
When Benson is yet again snubbed for a Parkie Award for Manager of the Year in favor of Gene the Vending Machine, the rest of the gang try to make Benson feel better with a guy's night out, after Rigby makes off with the award Gene just won. Note: This is the official season seven premiere.
184	3	"The Lunch Club"	Robert Alvarez	Calvin Wong and Casey Crowe	August 13, 2015	1035-197	1.55
When Rigby ruins Maellard's fancy lunch, either he or Benson have to write a letter of resignation before 5:00pm, or both of them will be fired.
185	4	"Local News Legend"	Robert Alvarez	Madeline Queripel and Alex Cline	August 20, 2015	1035-200	1.49
Margaret auditions for the chance to host a weekly news segment by doing an undercover investigation piece. Still, a mysterious, trenchcoated informant à la Deep Throat keeps giving her bogus leads.
186	5	"The Dome Experiment Special" (Note: This is a half-hour episode.)	Robert Alvarez	Toby Jones, Owen Dennis, Minty Lewis, and Ryan Pequin	August 27, 2015	1035-198; 1035-199	1.60
Benson is determined to prove he was right about the date of the "Dome Experiment," a month-long experiment in which the park workers are locked in a bio-dome. After the dome comes a day early, all signs point to a possible conspiracy over the dome's real intentions.
187	6	"Birthday Gift"	Robert Alvarez	Benton Connor and Sam Spina	September 3, 2015	1035-201	1.43
After overhearing Mordecai tell Skips that he gives the worst birthday presents, Rigby teams up with a video game programmer to make Mordecai the best gift ever. Guest stars: Steve Agee as Zaxon
188	7	"Cat Videos"	Robert Alvarez	Calvin Wong and Casey Crowe	September 10, 2015	1035-202	1.31
When Benson threatens to blow the whistle on Mordecai and Rigby's Funny Video Fridays, the duo distracts Benson with viral videos showing cats doing cute and crazy things, turning their boss into a cat video addict. Guest stars: Paul Scheer as Cat Masterson.
189	8	"Struck by Lightning"	Robert Alvarez	Toby Jones and Owen Dennis	September 17, 2015	1035-203	1.39
Muscle Man and Hi-Five Ghost get struck by lightning and develop a kind of amnesia causing them to forget their friendship. Song: "Jesu, Joy of Man's Desiring" by Johann Sebastian Bach.
190	9	"Terror Tales of the Park V"	Robert Alvarez	Toby Jones, Owen Dennis, Ryan Pequin, and Minty Lewis	October 29, 2015	1035-193; 1035-194	1.31
Benson tries to spice up the park's annual Halloween party by renting a wish-making machine. • "Mr. Boss Man" – Benson purchases a doll from TV that he hopes will make Mordecai and Rigby work, but it has other plans. • "WerePops" – Pops and the other park workers trial on a werewolf. • "Going Up" – Hi-Five Ghost gets stuck in an elevator while visiting Celia. • "Chocolatude" – Mordecai and Rigby are taken into an old hag's house and uncover a big secret. Note: This episode was first set to air on October 28, 2015, but was delayed by one day.
191	10	"The Return of Party Horse"	Robert Alvarez	Minty Lewis and Ryan Pequin	November 9, 2015	1035-204	1.03
Mordecai and Rigby want to help Party Horse get back together with his girlfriend. Note: This episode was first set to air on September 24, 2015, but was pulled due to the premiere of Wabbit. Guest voices: Chelsea Kane as Chrissy
192	11	"Sleep Cycle"	Robert Alvarez	Madeline Queripel and Alex Cline	November 10, 2015	1035-205	1.32
Mordecai and Rigby watch movies for three whole nights, throwing off their sleep cycles. Note: This episode was first set to air on October 1, 2015, but like the previous episode, it was pulled.
193	12	"Just Friends"	Robert Alvarez	Calvin Wong and Casey Crowe	November 11, 2015	1035-206	1.26
Rigby and Eileen get called away to Don's black belt ceremony, forcing Mordecai and Margaret to hang out alone – and Mordecai to confront his feelings for Margaret now that he is single. Guest voices: George Takei as Daisuke
194	13	"Benson's Pig"	Robert Alvarez	Benton Connor and Sam Spina	November 12, 2015	1035-207	1.16
Benson gets a pet pig named Applesauce and asks Mordecai and Rigby to look after him. Guest Stars: James Adomian as Harry
195	14	"The Eileen Plan"	Robert Alvarez	Minty Lewis and Ryan Pequin	November 13, 2015	1035-209	1.13
Rigby goes back to high school to graduate and earn his diploma, something he keeps secret from Eileen. But Eileen becomes suspicious when Rigby repeatedly cancels their dates.
196	15	"Hello China"	Robert Alvarez	Toby Jones and Owen Dennis	November 30, 2015	1035-208	1.25
To get high school credits, Rigby has to pass a foreign language class taught by Benson in China. Note: This episode was initially set to air on November 13, 2015, but was replaced by "The Eileen Plan."; Guest voices: Awkwafina as Apple
197	16	"Crazy Fake Plan"	Robert Alvarez	Madeline Queripel and Alex Cline	December 1, 2015	1035-211	1.25
Rigby is irate that Eileen always correctly guesses the surprise dates he plans for her, sometimes before he can even tell her. He develops an elaborate, circuitous plan involving numerous fake locations and a fake biker gang to throw her off.
198	17	"Win That Prize"	Robert Alvarez	Calvin Wong and Casey Crowe	December 2, 2015	1035-212	1.16
Pops is chosen to appear on a game show called Win That Prize and ends up being hired to a local TV station when his ideas and appearances become popular.
199	18	"Snow Tubing"	Robert Alvarez	Benton Connor and Sam Spina	December 3, 2015	1035-210	1.18
Eileen, Rigby, Mordecai, and Margaret go on a snow tubing trip while Eileen tries to conquer her fear of snow tubing.
200	19	"Chili Cook Off"	Robert Alvarez	Toby Jones and Owen Dennis	March 5, 2016	1035-213	1.08
Benson tries to defeat Gene in the Park Manager's Association's big chili cook-off. Note: This episode was first set to air on December 3, 2015, but it was pulled and replaced by "Snow Tubing."
201	20	"Donut Factory Holiday"	Robert Alvarez	Ryan Pequin and Nathan Bulmer	March 12, 2016 (Note: This episode was first released online on February 6, 2016.)	1035-214	1.02
The guys try to return a movie before they get hit with a late fee. Still, the tape gets stuck in the VCR. Note: This episode was first set to air on December 4, 2015, but along with the previous episode, it was pulled.
202	21	"Gymblonski"	Robert Alvarez	Benton Connor and Sam Spina	March 19, 2016 (Note: This episode was first released online on February 13, 2016.)	1035-215	1.17
Rigby's high school nemesis returns and tries to stop him from graduating from high school by making sure he fails gym class.
203	22	"Guys Night 2"	Robert Alvarez	Madeline Queripel and Alex Cline	March 26, 2016 (Note: This episode was first released online on February 20, 2016.)	1035-216	1.00
Thomas reunites with the Park Crew for one last Guys Night together.
204	23	"Gary's Synthesizer"	Robert Alvarez	Owen Dennis and Casey Crowe	April 2, 2016 (Note: This episode was first released online on February 27, 2016.)	1035-217	1.00
When Mordecai and Rigby mess around with the cables in an old synthesizer, Gary disappears, and the guys then have to find a way to bring him back.
205	24	"California King"	Robert Alvarez	Ryan Pequin	April 9, 2016	1035-219	1.10
After Rigby wins a king-size bed, he gets rid of his trampoline but quickly regrets his decision and tries to get his trampoline back. Guest voices: Jemaine Clement as Ziggy, a tribute to David Bowie as he appeared in Labyrinth.
206	25	"Cube Bros"	Robert Alvarez	Benton Connor and Sam Spina	April 16, 2016	1035-220	0.79
Feeling that the park workers only care about his strength, Muscle Man decides to prove that he can be smart by working in a corporate office.
207	26	"Maellard's Package"	Robert Alvarez	Madeline Queripel and Alex Cline	April 23, 2016	1035-221	0.94
Mordecai and Rigby wait for the delivery of a package at Maellard's mansion.
208	27	"Rigby Goes to the Prom"	Robert Alvarez	Toby Jones and Owen Dennis	May 5, 2016	1035-218	1.02
Rigby must borrow his dad's car and return it unnoticed so he can take Eileen to his school prom.
209	28	"The Button"	Robert Alvarez	Toby Jones and Owen Dennis	May 12, 2016 (Note: This episode was first released on iTunes on May 2, 2016.)	1035-223	1.40
"The Dome Experiment" is back on again and the guys are tasked to protect a large red button. Note 1: This episode was originally set to air on April 30, 2016, but it was delayed to May 12. 2016. Guest voices: Troy Baker as Dr. Langer
210	29	"Favorite Shirt"	Robert Alvarez	Ryan Pequin	May 19, 2016	1035-224	1.17
When Mordecai, Rigby, and Hi-Five Ghost accidentally destroy Muscle Man's favorite shirt, they have to replace it before Muscle Man finds out. Guest voices: Troy Baker as Dr. Langer
211	30	"Marvolo the Wizard"	Robert Alvarez	Benton Connor and Sam Spina	May 26, 2016	1035-225	1.35
Being unaware that a Renaissance Fair is being held at the park, Pops believes he has been sent back in time the Middle Ages.
212	31	"Pops' Favorite Planet"	Robert Alvarez	Madeline Queripel and Alex Cline	June 2, 2016	1035-226	1.25
Pops tries to see a planet that only passes by every 25 years.
213	32	"Pam I Am"	Robert Alvarez	Casey Crowe and Gideon Chase	June 2, 2016	1035-227	1.25
Benson hangs out with a dome worker named Pam. Song: "Friday I'm in Love" by the Cure. Note: The title is a pun on Sam-I-Am, the main character from Green Eggs and Ham by Dr. Seuss.
214	33	"Lame Lockdown"	Robert Alvarez	Benton Connor and Sam Spina	June 9, 2016	1035-230	1.02
Mordecai and Rigby are put on a 24-hour lockdown inside the house, but they want to see one of their favorite bands.
215	34	"VIP Members Only"	Robert Alvarez	Madeline Queripel and Alex Cline	June 16, 2016	1035-231	0.98
Mordecai, Rigby, Muscle Man, and Hi-Five Ghost want to be VIP members at Cheezer's.
216	35	"Deez Keys"	Robert Alvarez	Casey Crowe and Gideon Chase	June 23, 2016	1035-232	1.18
The duo deals with The Dome's scientists to help them search for Benson's car keys.
217	36	"Rigby's Graduation Day Special"	Robert Alvarez	Toby Jones, Owen Dennis, Ryan Pequin, and Minty Lewis	June 30, 2016	1035-228; 1035-229	1.10
Rigby must write a speech for his high school graduation that will be broadcast on national television. Meanwhile, Mordecai sinks into a depression over how Rigby is now more successful than he is and the park workers finally find out the true purpose of the dome experiment. Song: "Here Comes a Regular" by the Replacements.
