= Regular Show season 6 =

Regular Show
- Season 6
- Region 4 DVD cover
- Showrunner: J. G. Quintel
- Starring: J. G. Quintel; William Salyers; Sam Marin; Mark Hamill
- No. of episodes: 28

Release
- Original network: Cartoon Network
- Original release: October 9, 2014 – June 25, 2015

Season chronology
- ← Previous; Season 5 Next → Season 7

The sixth season of the American animated comedy television series Regular Show, created by J. G. Quintel, originally aired on Cartoon Network in the United States. Quintel created the series' pilot using characters from his comedy shorts for the canceled anthology series The Cartoonstitute. He developed Regular Show from his own experiences in college. Simultaneously, several of the show's main characters originated from his animated shorts The Naïve Man from Lolliland and 2 in the AM PM. Following its fifth season's success, Regular Show was renewed for a sixth season on October 29, 2013. The season ran from October 9, 2014, to June 25, 2015, and was produced by Cartoon Network Studios.

For this season, the writers were J. G. Quintel, Mike Roth, John Infantino, Sean Szeles, Michele Cavin and Matt Price, who is also the story editor.

== Development ==
=== Concept ===
Two 23-year-old friends, a blue jay named Mordecai and a raccoon named Rigby, are employed as groundskeepers at a park and spend their days trying to slack off and entertain themselves by any means. This is much to the chagrin of their boss Benson and their coworker Skips, but the delight of Pops. Their other coworkers, Muscle Man (an overweight green man) and Hi-Five Ghost (a ghost with a hand extending from the top of his head) serve as their rivals.

=== Production ===
Many of the characters are loosely based on those developed for Quintel's student films at California Institute of the Arts: The Naive Man From Lolliland and 2 in the AM PM. Quintel pitched Regular Show for Cartoon Network's Cartoonstitute project, in which the network allowed artists to create pilots with no notes to be optioned as a show possibly. After The Cartoonstitute was scrapped, and Cartoon Network executives approved the greenlight for Regular Show, production officially began on August 14, 2009. After being green-lit, Quintel recruited several indie comic book artists to compose the show's staff, as their style matched close to what he desired for the series. For this season, the writers were J. G. Quintel, Mike Roth, John Infantino, Sean Szeles, Michele Cavin, and Matt Price, who is also the story editor, while being produced by Cartoon Network Studios. This was the last season Roth was involved in, before he left to work with the Cartoon Network Studios shorts program; in which Szeles took his place as sole supervising producer.

The sixth season of Regular Show was produced between September 2013 and August 2014. It utilizes double entendres and mild language; Quintel stated that, although the network wanted to step up from the more child-oriented fare, some restrictions came with this switch.

== Episodes ==
No. overall	No. in season	Title	Directed by	Written and storyboarded by	Original release date	Prod. code	U.S. viewers (millions)
154	1	"Maxin' and Relaxin'"	Robert Alvarez (animation)	Calvin Wong and Ryan Pequin	October 9, 2014	1029–163	2.19
Mordecai fears of being embarrassed by his mother when C.J. wants to come over for a family dinner. Song: "Whoomp! (There It Is)" by Tag Team; Guest voices: Katey Sagal and Ed Begley Jr. as Mordecai's parents
155	2	"New Bro on Campus"	Robert Alvarez (animation)	Benton Connor and Madeline Queripel	October 16, 2014	1029–164	2.24
After ending his friendship with Hi-Five Ghost over an embarrassing video, Muscle Man recounts to Mordecai and Rigby the story of how they met back in high school. Guest voices: Danny Cooksey as Reggie
156	3	"Daddy Issues"	Robert Alvarez (animation)	Benton Connor and Sarah Oleksyk	October 23, 2014	1029–165	1.71
C.J. competes in a mini-golf tournament to win a card that permits people to cut in line at their favorite restaurant, but things hit a snag when C.J. has to compete against her overly-competitive father. Guest voices: Christopher McDonald as Carl Putter
157	4	"Terror Tales of the Park IV" (Note: This is a half-hour episode.)	Robert Alvarez (animation)	Toby Jones and Owen Dennis, Sarah Oleksyk and Minty Lewis ("Scary Movie Night" only)	October 29, 2014	1029–161	1.74
157	4	"Terror Tales of the Park IV"	Robert Alvarez (animation)	Toby Jones and Owen Dennis, Sarah Oleksyk and Minty Lewis ("Scary Movie Night" only)	October 29, 2014	1029–162	1.74
The park workers tell scary stories to keep Muscle Man awake while driving to visit his mother on Halloween. • "The Hole" ("The Wonderful Adventure of the Mysterious Hole in the Park") – Parodying "The Lottery" by Shirley Jackson, Pops has to be sacrificed to a sacred hole but tries to get the group to think of another way. • "Unfinished Business" – After Mordecai and Rigby die, Benson has to get the two fired in order to get them to stop haunting the house, only to realize he himself was the ghost all along. • "Scary Movie Night" – Mordecai, Rigby, Eileen and C.J. get stuck in a horror film and have to survive it until the end. Note: In the United Kingdom, this episode airs without the final story, "Scary Movie Night", due to scenes of horror deemed too strong for younger viewers.
158	5	"The End of Muscle Man"	Robert Alvarez (animation)	Minty Lewis and Sarah Oleksyk	October 30, 2014	1029–167	1.38
Muscle Man gives the group a list of things that he wants to do before "the end". When everyone realizes he is serious, they decide to make Muscle Man's final wishes come true.
159	6	"Lift with Your Back"	Robert Alvarez (animation)	Toby Jones and Owen Dennis	November 6, 2014	1029–166	1.71
Feeling unappreciated, Rigby quits his job at the park and gets a job with a moving company.
160	7	"Eileen Flat Screen"	Robert Alvarez (animation)	Minty Lewis and Sarah Oleksyk	November 13, 2014	1029–172	1.60
Rigby plans to surprise Eileen by setting up her new flat screen television set for her, but things take a turn when Eileen's roommate interferes.
161	8	"The Real Thomas"	J. G. Quintel; Robert Alvarez (animation)	Calvin Wong and Ryan Pequin	November 20, 2014	1029–169	1.71
161	8	"The Real Thomas"	J. G. Quintel; Robert Alvarez (animation)	Calvin Wong and Ryan Pequin	November 20, 2014	1029–170	1.71
Rigby suspects that Thomas is a Russian spy and, when he finds out that it is true, it is up to him, Mordecai, and Benson to save the park.
162	9	"The White Elephant Gift Exchange"	Robert Alvarez (animation)	Benton Connor and Madeline Queripel	December 4, 2014	1029–168	2.12
The park workers plot revenge against Muscle Man for giving them prank gifts every year during their White Elephant Gift Exchange. Song: "A Holly Jolly Christmas" by Burl Ives
163	10	"Merry Christmas Mordecai"	Robert Alvarez (animation)	Benton Connor and Madeline Queripel	December 4, 2014	1029–173	2.12
Margaret returns to town for Eileen's Christmas party, which complicates things for Mordecai now that he is with C.J. -- and things get worse when Mordecai breaks C.J.'s heart.
164	11	"Sad Sax"	Robert Alvarez (animation)	Ryan Pequin	January 8, 2015	1029–175	1.85
Following the events of the previous episode, Mordecai tries to make things right with C.J. with the help of a shirtless street saxophonist, but each of his solutions makes things worse. Guest voices: Katey Sagal as Mordecai's mother and Jason Mantzoukas as Sad Sax.
165	12	"Park Managers' Lunch"	Robert Alvarez (animation)	Toby Jones and Owen Dennis	January 15, 2015	1029–171	1.84
Benson is invited to a park managers' luncheon by Gene, but his employees worry that it might be a trap.
166	13	"Mordecai and Rigby Down Under"	Robert Alvarez (animation)	Calvin Wong and Casey Crowe	January 22, 2015	1029–174	1.88
Mordecai and Rigby are accidentally sent to Australia, so they have to look for a way to get to the airport or else Benson will have them fired for being late.
167	14	"Married and Broke"	Robert Alvarez (animation)	Toby Jones and Owen Dennis	January 29, 2015	1029–176	1.80
After his stockbroker is arrested on fraud charges, Muscle Man and Starla compete on a game show where couples compete to win an all-expenses-paid wedding.
168	15	"I See Turtles"	Robert Alvarez (animation)	Benton Connor and Madeline Queripel	February 5, 2015	1029–178	1.72
Mordecai, Rigby, C.J., and Eileen head to the beach to watch the sea turtles hatch and head into the ocean, but they stumble upon a beachside resort where the wealthy are using turtles in their spas as a fountain of youth. Guest voices: John Cygan as the sea turtles and Officer Hank and Danny Cooksey as the resort's manager and Officer Glenn
169	16	"Format Wars II"	Robert Alvarez (animation)	Calvin Wong and Casey Crowe	February 12, 2015	1029–179	1.67
Mordecai, Rigby, Muscle Man, Hi-Five Ghost and Benson set out to stop an impending war coming from a new format, DVD. Guest voice: Joel McHale as DVD
170	17	"Happy Birthday Song Contest"	Robert Alvarez (animation)	Minty Lewis and Sarah Oleksyk	February 19, 2015	1029–177	2.08
Mordecai and Rigby are determined to win a happy birthday song contest so they can get a year's supply of cake.
171	18	"Benson's Suit"	Robert Alvarez (animation)	Ryan Pequin	February 26, 2015	1029–180	1.86
Benson finds a suit in the park and begins wearing it to command respect — only to learn that the government made the suit and corrupt leaders and business people will stop at nothing to get it.
172	19	"Gamers Never Say Die"	Robert Alvarez (animation)	Toby Jones and Owen Dennis	March 5, 2015	1029–181	1.73
Mordecai, Rigby set out to find a rare video game patch from an old video game.
173	20	"1000th Chopper Flight Party"	Robert Alvarez (animation)	Minty Lewis	March 12, 2015	1029–182	1.66
Mordecai tries to avoid further relationship problems with Margaret when he attends a party commemorating the one thousandth flight of her father’s helicopter.
174	21	"Party Horse"	Robert Alvarez (animation)	Benton Connor and Madeline Queripel	March 19, 2015	1029–183	1.49
An alien horse known as Party Horse turns to Mordecai and Rigby to help him pass a test on the history of the United States. Guest voice: Adam Pally as Party Horse 42699
175	22	"Men in Uniform"	Robert Alvarez (animation)	Calvin Wong and Casey Crowe	March 26, 2015	1029–184	1.95
The park workers try to find different ways to save the park when Mr. Maellard announces his plans to put it out of business due to lack of attendance.
176	23	"Garage Door"	Robert Alvarez (animation)	Benton Connor and Madeline Queripel	April 2, 2015	1029–188	1.63
Mordecai and Rigby have to buy a new garage door after they damage the old one.
177	24	"Brilliant Century Duck Crisis Special"	Robert Alvarez (animation)	Toby Jones and Owen Dennis	April 9, 2015	1029–190	1.99
177	24	"Brilliant Century Duck Crisis Special"	Robert Alvarez (animation)	Toby Jones and Owen Dennis	April 9, 2015	1029–192	1.99
In an homage to the mecha anime genre, Mordecai and Rigby have to get rid of a cassowary in the park, which turns into an epic battle over merchandising rights when the Baby Ducks and Geese return to enlist the help of the park workers to defeat a pair of businessmen from PlayCo and their iron-clad contract. Song: "Daybreak on a Rose~Petal" by Mutato Muzika and Owen Dennis
178	25	"Not Great Double Date"	Robert Alvarez (animation)	Toby Jones and Owen Dennis	June 22, 2015	1029–186	1.66
After the events of "1000th Chopper Flight Party", C.J. comes over to forgive Margaret for what happened then (and what happened during the events of "Merry Christmas Mordecai") and invites her on a double date with her and Mordecai. The trouble is, Margaret lied about having a boyfriend so she could calm C.J. down from her rage — and must keep up the masquerade with the help of Eileen and Rigby's outlandish story of how they met.
179	26	"Death Kwon Do-Livery"	Robert Alvarez (animation)	Calvin Wong and Casey Crowe	June 23, 2015	1029–189	1.70
Mordecai and Rigby fight with the power of death-kwon-do to help Sensei obtain a new stomach for his much need stomach transplant. But his trainee, Jimmy, wants it for himself.
180	27	"Lunch Break"	Robert Alvarez (animation)	Minty Lewis and Ryan Pequin	June 24, 2015	1029–191	1.60
Mordecai and Rigby have to remember all of their food challenges so that they can eat a ten-foot sandwich.
181	28	"Dumped at the Altar"	Robert Alvarez (animation)	Minty Lewis and Ryan Pequin	June 25, 2015	1029–187	1.59
The park workers help Muscle Man and Starla on their wedding day. Meanwhile, Mordecai finds his relationship in danger when Margaret gets invited to the wedding and an awkward speech leads to a final falling-out between him and C.J.
