= Fastest Man Alive =

The Fastest Man Alive may refer to:

- The world record holder of the men's 100 metres dash, held by Usain Bolt as of May 31, 2008
  - Previous record holders of the men's 100 metres world record progression
- The Flash, several DC Comics superheroes with super speed:
  - Jay Garrick
  - Barry Allen
  - Wally West
  - Bart Allen
  - "Fastest Man Alive" (The Flash), a 2014 TV episode
- "Fastest Man Alive" (The Marvelous Misadventures of Flapjack), a 2010 TV episode
