= Regular Show: The Lost Tapes =

American animated series

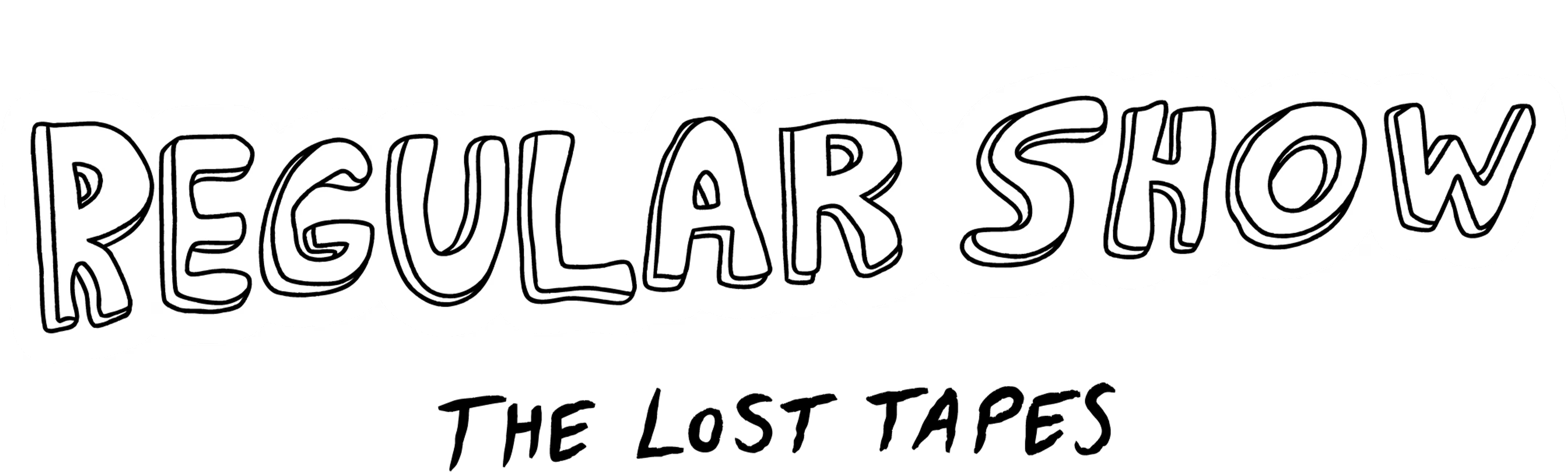
- Genre: Action adventure; Animated sitcom; Science fantasy; Surreal comedy; Black comedy; Comedy drama
- Created by: J. G. Quintel
- Showrunner: J. G. Quintel
- Voices of: J. G. Quintel; William Salyers; Sam Marin; Mark Hamill
- Theme music composer: J. G. Quintel
- Composers: Mark Mothersbaugh; John Enroth; Albert Fox
- Country of origin: United States
- Original language: English
- No. of seasons: 1
- No. of episodes: 19 (list of episodes)

Production
- Executive producers: J. G. Quintel; Sean Szeles; Sam Register
- Producer: Ryan Slater
- Running time: 11–22 minutes
- Production company: Cartoon Network Studios

Original release
- Network: Cartoon Network
- Release: May 11, 2026 – present

Related
- Regular Show; Regular Show: The Movie; Close Enough

Regular Show: The Lost Tapes is an American animated sitcom created by J. G. Quintel for Cartoon Network. A revival of Quintel's series Regular Show (2010–2017), the series premiered globally on May 11, 2026.

Similar to the original series, it follows the daily adventures of blue jay Mordecai and raccoon Rigby, who work as groundskeepers at a local park. Other members of the park include their grumpy, austere, no-nonsense but well-meaning boss Benson (a gumball machine), the childlike lollipop-shaped owner of the park Pops, and their coworkers, Skips (a yeti), Muscle Man, and Hi-Five Ghost.

== Premise ==
The series follows the lives of Mordecai (J. G. Quintel) and Rigby (William Salyers), two best friends and groundskeepers at a park where they often avoid work to have fun, much to the annoyance of their boss Benson (Sam Marin) and to the delight of Pops (Marin), the owner of the park. Other characters include their coworkers Skips (Mark Hamill), Muscle Man (Marin) and Hi-Five Ghost (Quintel). In every episode, Mordecai and Rigby face a new set of surreal situations at the park.

Every episode (as revealed in the first episode) is told under the framing device of Pops in the afterlife following the events of the series finale of the original series, in which each untold adventure is played out through footage from a box of VHS tapes Pops found, aptly titled "The Lost Tapes". As a result, any episode can theoretically take place in different time periods of the original series instead of following a linear timeline.

== Production ==
On June 12, 2024, Warner Bros. Discovery announced that a new Regular Show series titled Regular Show: The Lost Tapes had been greenlit for two seasons, with J. G. Quintel returning as showrunner. On September 30, 2024, Mark Hamill confirmed that he would reprise his role as Skips. Later it was unveiled that much of the original cast—including Quintel, William Salyers, Sam Marin, and Minty Lewis—were returning. The series is produced by Cartoon Network Studios, with Quintel and Sean Szeles returning as executive producers alongside studio president Sam Register.

== Episodes ==
No.	Title	Written and storyboarded by	Story by	Original release date	Prod. code	U.S. viewers (millions)
1	"Fix That Tape" (Note: Afterlife episode)	Written by : J. G. Quintel, Sean Szeles, Toby Jones, and Calvin Wong; Storyboarded by : Siti Lu and Calvin Wong	Matt Price	May 11, 2026	324	0.20
Following the events of the series finale of the original series, Pops, now residing in the afterlife, accidentally breaks his memory VHS tape and tries to find another copy. Song: "Mr. Blue Sky" by Electric Light Orchestra
2	"Skips' Luau"	Maddie Brewer and Ryan Pequin	Minty Lewis	May 11, 2026	321	0.20
Mordecai and Rigby use a hovercraft to take out the trash after Benson revokes their wheel privileges so they can attend Skips' luau and eat a special burger. An FBI agent mistakes them for aliens. Song: "Kiss on My List" by Daryl Hall & John Oates
3	"Blade Games"	Sam Lane and Bryan Mann	Minty Lewis	May 12, 2026 (Note: This episode first premiered on HBO Max internationally on May 11, 2026, ahead of its official air date.)	323	0.17
Benson watches a motivational VHS tape to find ways to improve Mordecai and Rigby's work ethic.
4	"Nap Spot"	Alex Cline and Monty Ray	Michele Cavin and Matt Price	May 13, 2026	322	0.08
When Mordecai and Rigby discover Muscle Man's secret nap spot, Muscle Man has to enter their dreams to rescue them from its horrors.
5	"Coffee Shop Wars"	Maddie Brewer and Ryan Pequin	Michele Cavin	May 14, 2026	325	0.08
Margaret and Eileen create a new recipe to compete with a nearby fusion restaurant threatening their coffee shop.
6	"Boba or Bo-Bust"	Alex Cline and Monty Ray	Minty Lewis	May 18, 2026	326	0.16
After replacing all the food in the snack bar with boba, Mordecai and Rigby have to sell it and repay the money they spent. They later use Pops as a mascot for the boba, which transforms him into a new persona, "Boba Casanova."
7	"Corpse Flower"	Monty Ray and Alex Cline	Minty Lewis	May 19, 2026 (Note: This episode first premiered on HBO Max internationally on May 18, 2026, ahead of its official air date.)	330	0.12
When Eileen learns that her trip to see the blooming of a corpse flower coincides with Margaret's poetry recital, Rigby helps her attempt to attend both events in time.
8	"Beginson"	Hilary Florido and Madeline Queripel	Michele Cavin	May 20, 2026	328	0.10
Benson recounts how he was kicked out of his band, Hair to the Throne, and later became the park manager after dealing with a lazy coworker named Talks.
9	"Good Mitch Spiking"	Sam Lane and Bryan Mann	Michele Cavin	May 21, 2026	335	0.12
Muscle Man recounts his first breakup with Starla and how he pursued a volleyball career to win her back.
10	"Stilt Walkers"	Maddie Brewer and Ryan Pequin	Matt Price	May 22, 2026	329	0.21
When Rigby uses a pair of stilts as chopsticks for old Christmas decorations to act as sushi, and wants a picture taken out of it, the others call it a terrible idea. This leads him to move to a small civilization led by Uncle Sam, where everyone walks in stilts.
11	"Spice It Up"	Maddie Brewer and Ryan Pequin	Minty Lewis	September 19, 2026 (Note: This episode premiered on HBO Max internationally and YouTube on September 7, 2026, ahead of its official air date.)	337	N/A
Wanting to recreate a spicy wing challenge with his afterlife friends that he once did with the park crew when he was alive, Pops goes to the underworld to obtain a special bottle of hot sauce.
12	"Secret Menu Item"	Sam Lane and Bryan Mann	Matt Price	September 26, 2026 (Note: This episode premiered on HBO Max internationally on September 7, 2026, ahead of its official air date.)	327	N/A
After discovering that the restaurant "Taco the Morning" is offering a secret menu item exclusively for 2 customers, Rigby is bent on getting that item. Due to Mordecai and the rest of the park crew being occupied with their own things, Rigby ends up taking Eileen with him to the restaurant where they eventually find themselves exploring an underground cave that leads to the menu item. While traversing the cave, Rigby and Eileen get to learn more about each other by discussing their favorite interests and memories.
13	"Terror Tales of the Park VII" (Note: This is a half-hour episode.) (Note: While the episode mainly takes place in the afterlife, the stories featured in it are presented as video tapes.)	Hilary Florido and Madeline Queripel ("Y.A.M." and "Killer Workout"), Maddie Brewer and Ryan Pequin ("Feedback Goop")	Matt Price, Michele Cavin and Minty Lewis	October 3, 2026	340	N/A
13	"Terror Tales of the Park VII"	Hilary Florido and Madeline Queripel ("Y.A.M." and "Killer Workout"), Maddie Brewer and Ryan Pequin ("Feedback Goop")	Matt Price, Michele Cavin and Minty Lewis	October 3, 2026	341	N/A
Pops throws a Halloween party where him and his afterlife friends watch scary video tapes featuring him and the park crew. • "Y.A.M." - The gang (except for Benson and Hi-Five Ghost) go to eat at a revolving sushi bar, but they eventually find themselves becoming part of the menu. • "Killer Workout" – After discovering many reports about Eileen's garage being a recurring spot for various deaths in the past, she and Margaret try to find the cause of them. The girls soon discover that the deaths are connected to 80's Aerobics instructor Tina Timber (nicknamed the "Leg Warmer Maniac"). • "Feedback Goop" – When Mordecai and Rigby buy a Video camera at an Estate sale, they are warned by the seller to not use it to film a feedback loop with a television or else they'll release a monster trapped inside the camera. Rigby of course ignores the seller's instructions and ends up unintentionally releasing the monster loose into the park, and now him, Mordecai, and the rest of the park crew must get it back into the camera via the television.
14	"Smoke Alarm on the Water"	Sam Lane and Bryan Mann	Matt Price	October 10, 2026 (Note: This episode first premiered on HBO Max internationally on September 14, 2026, ahead of its official air date.)	331	N/A
When the park temporally gets shut down by a safety inspector after Mordecai and Rigby take out all the smoke alarms in the house due to their constant beeping keeping the two up all night, Benson has the duo replace all the smoke alarms or else the park will be closed permanently. The duo end up purchasing hi-tech smoke alarms called "Toby Tilapia 2.0", but Skips becomes skeptical about them.
15	"Party Horse 4: Third Time's a Charm"	Maddie Brewer and Ryan Pequin	Matt Price	October 17, 2026	333	N/A
Wanting to throw Skips an awesome birthday party (despite him saying that he doesn't want one), Mordecai and Rigby try to see if Party Horse can come and help them out, but the duo forgot that he has now become the new Principal Party Horse on his planet after the previous PPH tricked him into getting sprayed with gas that transformed him into the new principal. Mordecai and Rigby try to change Party Horse back into his normal partying self before Skips' birthday is over.
16	"Clean the Living Room"	Owen Dennis and Monty Ray	Matt Price	October 24, 2026	334	TBD
17	"Artist's Block"	Hilary Florido, Madeline Queripel, J. G. Quintel and Sean Szeles	Michele Cavin	October 31, 2026 (Note: This episode was accidentally added to Hulu and Disney+ via a bundle subscription prematurely on May 28, 2026. It would later be taken down hours later.)	332	TBD
18	"That's Funny"	Owen Dennis and Monty Ray	Michele Cavin	November 7, 2026	338	TBD
19	"Cool Boss"	Sam Lane and Bryan Mann	Minty Lewis	November 14, 2026	339	TBD
20	"Skips' Van"	Owen Dennis and Monty Ray	TBA	2027	342	TBD
21	"Super Strong Johns"	TBD	TBA	2027	343	TBD
22	"Car Wash"	TBD	TBA	2027	336	TBD
23	"All You Can Fit"	Hilary Florido and Madeline Queripel	Matt Price	2027	344	TBD
24	"Don's Back"	TBD	TBA	2027	359	TBD
25	"Life & Death of Robot Dog"	TBD	TBA	2027	345	TBD
26	"Before Sunrise"	TBD	TBA	2027	349	TBD
27	"Recycle Yo!"	TBD	TBA	2027	346	TBD
28	"Hi Five's Throat"	TBD	TBA	2027	347	TBD
29	"Carter & Briggs Are Here"	TBD	TBA	2027	348	TBD
30	"Wet Phone"	TBA	TBA	TBA	TBA	TBD
31	"Dip Deep"	TBA	TBA	TBA	TBA	TBD
32	"Ketch of the Day"	TBA	TBA	TBA	TBA	TBD
33	"Thanks for the Memories"	TBA	TBA	TBA	TBA	TBD
34	"Master Curator"	TBA	TBA	TBA	TBA	TBD
35	"12,000 Seconds"	TBA	TBA	TBA	TBA	TBD
36	"The Afterheist"	TBA	TBA	TBA	TBA	TBD
37	"Japlan"	TBA	TBA	TBA	TBA	TBD
38	"The Ultimate Format War"	TBA	TBA	TBA	TBA	TBD
38	"The Ultimate Format War"	TBA	TBA	TBA	TBA	TBD

== Release ==
Regular Show: The Lost Tapes officially premiered on Cartoon Network feeds worldwide on May 11, 2026. In Canada, the series aired on YTV the same day. The series is also streaming on HBO Max and Hulu, starting in the United States on June 8, 2026. Internationally, the series is streaming on StackTV and Teletoon+ in Canada, Neon in New Zealand, Now in Italy, and Movistar Plus+ in Spain. Select episodes are available to stream for free on Sling TV.

=== Critical reception ===
Chris Gallardo of Tell-Tale TV gave the series a positive review, assuring that the humor of the series is "still as absurd as ever, blending its off-beat, surreal humor with the fast-paced energy" and that "the comedy still hits relatively the same". Sean Isaacs of The Fanboy Factor praises the series for retaining its original format and "presenting the episodes as stories that could have existed alongside the original run rather than continuing it."

Guy Dolbey of DiscussingFilm rated the series 2 out of 5 stars; he critiqued the material as too familiar to the original series, lacking in surprises, and deemed the humor as "not very funny", while comparing to the perceived decline in quality of The Simpsons. Wilson Chapman of IndieWire criticized the series for "failing to stack up to the original run at its best" and being "a bit frantic and poorly paced, lacking the contrast between the chill, down-to-earth characters and the absurdity surrounding them that gave the series its initial hook".
