= A Regular Epic Final Battle =

28th, 29th, and 30th episodes of the 8th season of Regular Show

- Regular Show episode
- Episode no.: Season 8 Episode 27
- Directed by: Calvin Wong (supervising director); Mike Roth (creative director)
- Written by: Minty Lewis; Ryan Pequin; Andres Salaff; Benton Connor; Owen Dennis; Alex Cline; Madeline Queripel; Sam Spina; J. G. Quintel
- Story by: J. G. Quintel; Matt Price; Patrick Baker; Gina Ippito; Sean Szeles
- Production codes: 1045-262; 1045-264A; 1045-264B
- Original air date: January 16, 2017
- Running time: 33 minutes (combined)

Episode chronology
← Previous "Cheer Up Pops"	Next → —
- Regular Show season 8

"A Regular Epic Final Battle" (subtitled "Part 1" and "Part 2") and "The Power" form the three-part series finale of the American animated television series Regular Show. It originally aired on Cartoon Network in the United States on January 16, 2017. All parts are 11 minutes long. The finale follows Mordecai, Rigby and their co-workers assisting their friend Pops in the final battle against Pops' evil twin, Anti-Pops to prevent the destruction of the universe.

1.33 million viewers watched Part 1 and 1.37 million viewers watched Parts 2 and 3, making it the most viewed episode of the eighth season.

== Plot ==
=== "A Regular Epic Final Battle" ===
==== Part 1 ====
Pops has a nightmare about his upcoming fight with his brother Anti-Pops, and Mordecai and Rigby comfort him. A short time later, the park crew arrives at Lolliland. They meet a group of Lolliland natives: Frivola-Kranus, Quadravi-Kranus, and Weird Mushroom Guy. The natives explain that Pops is the perfect creation of their planet called Mega-Kranus and Anti-Pops was created as his opposite to maintain balance in the universe called Malum-Kranus, respectively. The natives show the park crew ancient tapestries of the previous battles between Pops and Anti-Pops, which detail prior incarnations of the park crew fighting alongside Pops. Knowing that all the prior battles have ended in a stalemate (resulting in the universe resetting), Mordecai comes up with setting traps for Anti-Pops to give Pops an upper hand, which he did not have in previous battles. Pops reluctantly agrees to do so. After Anti-Pops and his bounty hunters arrive in an Uber-like taxi following the destruction of most of the former's ship, Pops tries to convince him not to fight because they are brothers. Anti-Pops refuses and attacks Pops but is caught in all the traps laid by the park crew. The victory is short-lived, however, as Anti-Pops emerges unscathed.

==== Part 2 ====
To ensure his friends' survival, Pops makes a deal with Anti-Pops: whoever lands the first blow in battle gets to decide the fate of the universe. Pops successfully injures Anti-Pops, but Anti-Pops breaks the agreement and continues the fight. Streaming, who still has his sights on destroying the Disc Masters, suddenly arrives with his Stream Box Bot minions and aids Anti-Pops in the battle. Meanwhile, the park crew, HD DVD, Blu-ray, the Baby Ducks, Toothpick Sally, Recap Robot, Chance Sureshot (whose prior "death" in "Space Escape" is revealed to be that of a clone), the Guardians of Eternal Youth, Gary, Carter and Briggs, Death, Party Horse 42699, and the Guardian of Lolliland (who is supposed to remain neutral) fight against Anti-Pops's minions, Streaming, and the Stream Box Bots (who merge with their master to power him up) and manage to defeat them. However, Anti-Pops assumes his titan form and begins erasing Lolliland. The erasing of Muscle Man and Hi Five Ghost causes Pops to assume his titan form as well. Anti-Pops proceeds to erase the rest of Pops' allies and friends except Mordecai and Rigby, and kick his brother into a portal. Mordecai and Rigby realize that the only way to stop time from resetting is to get in between them while they are about to punch each other. As the two brothers' punches collide (with Mordecai and Rigby between their knuckles), it obliterates the entire universe and resets time.

=== Part 3 ===
Part 3 begins precisely like the first episode of Season 1, "The Power," seemingly "resetting" time back to the series' beginning. After experiencing déjà vu, Rigby quickly remembers the events of the prior episodes and the rest of the series, but Mordecai doesn’t remember until Rigby shows him the stash of buried Blu-rays (from the previous episode "Cheer Up Pops"), which triggers his memories of the series' events after touching it. Realizing that time did not correctly reset, they use the Power to take them to the future and back to the battle between Pops and Anti-Pops. Anti-Pops attacks them, destroying the Power in the process. As Pops continues to fight, it becomes clear that fighting Anti-Pops will inevitably lead to another stalemate, which he realizes through flashbacks to the first two parts of the episode and "Kill 'Em with Kindness." Pops grabs Anti-Pops and flies toward the sun, telepathically comforting Mordecai and Rigby. Anti-Pops reconciles with his brother, and the two are finally at peace before they fly into the sun. With the resetting cycle broken, the effects of Anti-Pops' erasing are reversed, and the erased workers and allies are revived. After three years in space, the park workers fly back to Earth, where they reunite with their friends and families and are welcomed as heroes.

The park workers and Mr. Maellard erect a memorial statue in honor of Pops and mourn him. After six years of working at the park, Mordecai and Rigby quit their jobs and move on with their lives. Mordecai becomes a successful artist, marries a female bat named Stef, and has three children with her. Rigby and Eileen get married and raise two daughters. Muscle Man and Starla move into a better trailer in the park and have many children, who adopt many of his mannerisms (like taking off their shirts and yelling). High-Five Ghost and his girlfriend, Celia, become party DJs touring in Prague and later have a son. Benson, who has now become the park owner after Mr. Maellard's death, reunites with and marries his girlfriend, Pam (who becomes co-manager alongside her husband), and the two adopt five cats along with Applesauce, Benson's pig. Skips continues happily working in the park, but ditches his trademark jeans for jean shorts. At their 25th anniversary reunion, the park crew raises a statue of the now-deceased Mr. Maellard next to the one of Pops and take a picture in front of it with their families. As the reunion party commences, Mordecai and Rigby (now 54-years-old) reminisce on Pops' sacrifice and how none of them would have been able to lead such beautiful lives without him. They decide to play some old arcade games in the shed before saying their catchphrases and laughing about how immature they used to be. It is then revealed that Pops is watching his friends in what seems to be an afterlife (presumably Heaven) on a VHS tape labeled "Regular Show". He ejects the video and says "Jolly good show".

== Development ==
Regular Show was renewed for an eighth and final season on July 7, 2015, with release date of the three-part series finale announced at San Diego Comic-Con, and the season premiered on September 26, 2016. The writers and storyboard artists were Benton Connor, Madeline Queripel, Casey Crowe, Owen Dennis, Minty Lewis, Ryan Pequin, Sam Spina, Gideon Chase, Alex Cline, and newcomer Sean Glaze. Kacie Hermanson served as the new main character designer, with Calvin Wong serving as supervising director, J. G. Quintel, Sean Szeles, Gina Ippolito, Patrick Baker, and Matt Price serving as story writers, and the latter serving as story editor, while being produced by Cartoon Network Studios. Szeles also served as supervising producer, while Ryan Slater served as producer. The finale also marked the return of former Regular Show writer and storyboard artist Andres Salaff. After production on the series wrapped up, several crew members continued to work with Quintel on his next series Close Enough.

Mordecai's wife, introduced during the closing montage of the finale, was not given a name in the show. Head writer Matt Price, on Reddit, gave her the name Stef when asked about it due to Quintel's love for The Goonies, with writer Owen Dennis stating on Tumblr that there had not been previous plans to give a name to the character.

== Broadcast ==
The episode premiered on Cartoon Network on January 16, 2017, at 6:00pm ET/PT. It was viewed by 1.33 million viewers in part one and 1.37 million viewers each in parts two and three, making it the most-watched episode of the eighth season.

== Reception ==
Eric Thurm of The A.V. Club praised the finale, stating that the finale was "a fight that cyclically bookends the destruction and rebirth of the Regular Show universe. Thurm also praised the finale for the future lives of the characters who have their own brief sendoff, and describes Regular Show itself as two things: "a frequently surreal, borderline adult show on a network primarily for children", and "a product of ’80s nostalgia that preceded a boom in similar, less inventive shows, and found much of what was fun in that era’s pop culture."

Lorinda Marrian of Screen Rant places all three parts of the finale at the top of the "15 Best Episodes Of Regular Show, According To IMDb", claiming that the first part was the perfect start to the finale and that the last part, in his own words, "was an action-packed and heartfelt sendoff to one of Cartoon Network's best shows."

== Continuation ==
On June 12, 2024, Warner Bros. Discovery announced that a new Regular Show series had been greenlit for two seasons, with Quintel returning as showrunner. On September 30, 2024, Mark Hamill confirmed that he would reprise his role as Skips. On October 11, 2024, an intern job was listed on the Warner Bros. Discovery website, revealing the show's working title to be "Regular Show: Lost Tapes". On November 19, 2024, William Salyers revealed via his Instagram that he had returned to Cartoon Network Studios (now located within Warner Bros. Animation Studios) to record for the series, reprising his role as Rigby. Later in the same month, Janie Haddad confirmed that she had recorded lines for the series, reprising her role as Margaret.

== Cultural references ==
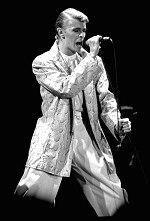
The episode's ending montage features the song "Heroes" by David Bowie (pictured in 1978) as a tribute to the late musician.

"Heroes" by David Bowie is played during the montage at the end of the third part. This also served as a tribute to him as he had died about one year prior to the episode's release.

During the fight scene between Pops and Anti-Pops towards the end of Part 2, many fourth wall breaks occur, one of which being Pops interacting with himself from the Regular Show pilot short "The Naive Man from Lolliland."
