= Dream Warrior =

Dream Warrior or Dream Warriors may refer to:

- Dream Warrior Pictures, an Indian film studio
- Dream Warriors (band), Canadian hip hop duo
- "Dream Warriors" (song), song by American metal band Dokken
- A Nightmare on Elm Street 3: Dream Warriors, 1987 American slasher fantasy film
- "The Dream Warrior", a 2016 episode of Regular Show in Space
