= Regular Show: The Movie =

2015 film by J. G. Quintel

- Release poster
- Directed by: J. G. Quintel
- Screenplay by: J. G. Quintel; Sean Szeles
- Story by: J. G. Quintel; Matt Price; John Infantino; Mike Roth; Michele Cavin; Sean Szeles
- Based on: Regular Show by J. G. Quintel
- Produced by: Ryan Slater
- Starring: William Salyers; J. G. Quintel; Sam Marin; Mark Hamill; Jason Mantzoukas; David Koechner
- Edited by: Bobby Gibis
- Music by: Mark Mothersbaugh; John Enroth; Albert Fox
- Production company: Cartoon Network Studios
- Distributed by: Warner Bros. Pictures
- Release dates: August 14, 2015 (Downtown Independent release); September 1, 2015 (Digital release); October 13, 2015 (DVD release); November 25, 2015 (TV release)
- Running time: 68 minutes
- Country: United States
- Language: English

Regular Show: The Movie is a 2015 American animated science fiction comedy film set within the television series of the same name. (Note: J. G. Quintel confirmed that Regular Show: The Movie is canon to Regular Show and is set during the events of the series' seventh season.) Produced by Cartoon Network Studios, the film was co-written and directed by series creator J. G. Quintel, who stars alongside William Salyers, Sam Marin, and Mark Hamill, reprising their respective roles from the series, with Jason Mantzoukas and David Koechner joining the cast. The film follows Mordecai and Rigby, along with their groundskeeping co-workers Muscle Man, Hi-Five Ghost, and Skips, boss Benson, and park manager Pops, as they embark on a mission to save the universe and their friendship from a vengeful volleyball coach who plans to erase all time.

The film premiered on August 14, 2015, at the Downtown Independent theatre in Los Angeles, where it was shown until August 20. It is the third film based on a Cartoon Network property to receive a theatrical release, after The Powerpuff Girls Movie and Aqua Teen Hunger Force Colon Movie Film for Theaters, and the first Cartoon Network original film since Ed, Edd n Eddy's Big Picture Show in 2009. The film was released digitally on September 1, 2015, on DVD on October 13, 2015, and ultimately had its television premiere on November 25, 2015, on Cartoon Network.

== Plot ==
In the distant future, Rigby, Benson, Skips, Hi-Five Ghost, Muscle Man, and Pops fight Lord Ross, a madman plotting to erase time itself. Aiding him is a cybernetic Mordecai, who is estranged from Rigby for a past transgression. The entire team is killed except for Rigby, who escapes by using a "timeship", a time-traveling space vehicle, to travel to the past, though not before Mordecai mortally shoots him.

In the present, Mordecai and Rigby barely convince Benson not to fire them after running late due to Rigby's idea to get breakfast burritos. Future Rigby crash-lands in the park and reveals that, when Mordecai and Rigby were in high school, they built a time machine that backfired and created a "Time-nado", a tornado able to travel through space and time; its power was later harnessed and weaponized by their former science teacher and volleyball coach, Mr. Ross, who was held responsible for the incident and arrested. Before dying, future Rigby tells his present self that he will soon have to reveal a secret from his past to save the universe, even if it destroys his friendship with Mordecai. Mordecai explains that they created the time machine because Rigby got into their dream college, College University, but he did not.

After preparing for the mission, Mordecai, Rigby, and their co-workers use the timeship to travel back in time, damaging the ship's engines in the process. Skips, Muscle Man, and Hi-Five Ghost stay behind to fix them while the others go to Mordecai and Rigby's old high school to destroy the time machine that their past selves are working on. Mr. Ross is angry at Rigby for costing his volleyball team the championship, but is forced to let him do an extra credit assignment to pass his class. After an encounter with the volleyball team, who mistake Benson and Pops for spies from a rival school, Mordecai and Rigby meet their past selves and convince past Rigby to make a model volcano instead, before destroying the time machine.

Believing their mission to be over, Mordecai, Rigby, Benson, and Pops return to the timeship, but after it is repaired, temporal ruptures begin appearing, as Rigby and Mordecai's past selves are about to finish a second time machine planted by Lord Ross. The employees race back to the school but are held up by Ross and future Mordecai, allowing past Mordecai and Rigby to botch the second time machine and create the Time-nado. Ross then forces Rigby to admit the truth: he never got into College University, but Mordecai did; unwilling to get separated from Mordecai, Rigby created his fake rejection letter to maintain their friendship. Ross then tries to kill Mordecai with a volleyball bomb, but future Mordecai, having a change of heart, jumps into the bomb's path, forcing Ross to retreat.

Enraged at Rigby's duplicity, Mordecai ends his friendship with him. Heartbroken, Rigby runs off with the timeship, leaving the group behind. Before dying, future Mordecai gives his present self his timeship and advises him to patch things up with Rigby, expressing regret over the corrupt path he chose that led him to kill future Rigby. As the group tries to rebound, a distress call from future Gene the Vending Machine prompts them to help out. Following a suicide attempt by flying into the Sun, Rigby encounters Father Time, who is falling apart due to the Time-nado. He convinces Rigby to head to the future and apologize to Mordecai. At the Time-nado space station, Lord Ross intercepts Rigby and Mordecai. With Techmo's help, they defeat Ross and restore their friendship before using the plutonium from Mordecai's timeship to destroy the Time-nado. Later, they convince past Rigby to apologize to Mr. Ross before the latter is arrested, ending the feud between them.

Returning to the present, Mordecai and Rigby promise not to let their friendship degrade into trying to kill each other, altering the future and erasing their dead future selves. The next day, as Benson catches them out of the park, the pair race back in the timeship from a fast food place, glad that they will "never be late again".

== Cast ==
=== Main voices ===
- William Salyers as Rigby
- J. G. Quintel as Mordecai and Hi-Five Ghost
- Sam Marin as Benson, Pops and Muscle Man
- Mark Hamill as Skips
- Jason Mantzoukas as Mr. Ross
- David Koechner as Principal Dean

=== Additional voices ===
- Minty Lewis as Eileen
- Roger Craig Smith as Francis Jablonski, Frank Smith, Fast Food Guy
- Ali Hillis as Ship Computer, Barbara
- Kurtwood Smith as Gene
- Eddie Pepitone as Sherm
- Paul F. Tompkins as Gino
- Fred Tatasciore as Father Time, Security Guard, Timenado Mechanic, Willy, News Reporter
- Steve Blum as Techmo, Brit, Commander, TV Game
- Janie Haddad as Margaret

== Production ==
The film was first announced in February 2015 during the Cartoon Network upfront. Regular Show creator J. G. Quintel announced on June 11, 2015, via Twitter that the production of the film had been completed. A trailer for the film was shown at the 2015 Comic Con International event on July 10 and was later released online on July 12. Despite being announced in February 2015, the film had already begun production in 2014.

During production of the show's fourth season, the network asked Quintel if he would like to do a forty-minute special episode. Quintel turned down the offer and asked to do a film instead. The network agreed, and the idea was put into development.

Quintel confirmed that the film is canon to the events of the show, and is set directly after the events of season six.

The sixth season of Regular Show was affected by the film. It was set to have 40 11-minute segments, but due to the production of the film, only 31 were produced, for a total of 28 episodes (the half-hour episodes take up two production codes). The seventh season featured 36 episodes.

== Soundtrack ==
The soundtrack for the film featured three real-life songs, namely "March of the Swivel Heads", "The Future's So Bright, I Gotta Wear Shades", and "Pale Blue Eyes".

== Release ==
=== Theatrical limited release ===
The film had its world premiere at the Downtown Independent theatre on August 14, 2015, and continued to play there until August 20. The film also screened at select Alamo Drafthouse Cinemas across the United States, and had a select showtime at the SVA Theatre of New York and in Montreal, Canada, during October 2015.

=== Television premiere ===
Regular Show: The Movie premiered on Cartoon Network in the United States and Cartoon Network in Canada on November 25, 2015. It premiered on Cartoon Network in the United Kingdom and Ireland and Cartoon Network in Australia and New Zealand on November 28, 2015.

=== Home media release ===
The film was released on digital platforms such as iTunes and Google Play Movies & TV on September 1, 2015. It was later released to DVD by Warner Home Video on October 13, 2015. This version includes an audio commentary, deleted scenes, film animatics, the trailer, the original board pitch, concept art, and film art galleries. It is estimated to have grossed $186,865 in domestic DVD sales.

== Reception ==
=== Critical response ===
Emily Ashby of Common Sense Media said in her review, "Regular Show: The Movie is full of far-fetched scenarios and story tangents. There's a lot of cartoon violence, including some fistfights, explosions, the use of hand-held blasters, and the disintegration of some characters. Language is marginal ("stupid," "butt," and the like), and the characters sometimes act on selfish or vengeful urges. That said, a main character realizes when his actions affect others in a negative way and attempts to set things right in the end." Felix Vasquez Jr. of Cinema Crazed called it "a great treat for devotees of the series; it's simple, very entertaining, and never loses sight of what makes the show so excellent."

=== Ratings ===
The film was watched by 2.17 million viewers and received a 0.5 Nielsen rating in adults 18–49.
