= List of The Marvelous Misadventures of Flapjack episodes =

The Marvelous Misadventures of Flapjack is an American animated television series created by Thurop Van Orman for Cartoon Network. The series centers on Flapjack, voiced by Van Orman, an aspiring young sailor raised by Bubbie the whale and mentored by the grisly ex-pirate Captain K'nuckles. Flapjack, K'nuckles, and Bubbie reside in Stormalong Harbor, where they are always in search of the elusive Candied Island. While in Stormalong Harbor, Flapjack and company are surrounded by a cast of recurring characters that include Peppermint Larry, the owner of a candy store; Doctor Julius Barber, Stormalong's doctor and barber; Dock Hag, the law enforcement officer; Sally Syrup, a young girl who sells seashells; and Eight-Armed Willy, an octopus with a secret stash of candy.

The Marvelous Misadventures of Flapjack ran for 46 episodes across three seasons (90 episode segments). Originally airing in 2007 as a series of five animated shorts, Flapjack premiered as a full series on June 5, 2008, with the episode "Several Leagues Under the Sea". The series finale, "Fish Out of Water", aired on August 31, 2010.

== Series overview ==
Season	Segments	Episodes	Originally released	
Season	Segments	Episodes	First released	Last released
Pilots	N/A	2	May 7, 2007	
Shorts	N/A	5	July 27, 2007	August 24, 2007
1	40	20	June 5, 2008	July 23, 2009
2	38	20	July 30, 2009	June 28, 2010
3	12	6	July 5, 2010	August 31, 2010

== Episodes ==
=== Shorts (2007) ===
These shorts were shown as part of Cartoon Network's Wedgies in 2008, and have a shorter length (about five minutes) than a standard episode (about 22 minutes, without commercials).

No.	Title	Original release date
1	"Flagship"	July 27, 2007 (Note: This short aired almost one year before the actual show debuted as part of Cartoon Network's "Sneaky Sunday", where they aired sneak peeks of shows that were set to debut in 2008.)
Flapjack finds Peppermint Larry sending messages to ships offshore using signal flags, which Flapjack imitates with disastrous results.
2	"Fishmonger"	August 3, 2007
K'nuckles tries to haggle-free fish from a shop owner, while Flapjack earns extra money entertaining the crowd.
3	"Sea Sick"	August 10, 2007
Flapjack keeps jumping into the sea, only to be tossed back out again. When K'nuckles sees this, he says the sea is sick of Flapjack.
4	"I Flushy My Brushy"	August 17, 2007
Captain K'nuckles convinces Flapjack that a true adventurer doesn't brush his teeth.
5	"Starry Night"	August 24, 2007
Flapjack keeps bothering a tired Captain K'nuckles about the stars.

==== Pilot and "Captain and ToeNeil" ====
"Captain and ToeNeil" is the name incorrectly used for the pilot short that was supposed to originally air as part of Cartoon Network's Wedgies. After it was canceled it was advertised as a bonus feature on the Flapjack, Volume 1 DVD; however, it was not on the DVD when it was released. Series creator Thurop Van Orman later asserted that "Captain and ToeNeil" was a regular short and not the pilot. A short clip of the pilot was shown during an interview with Thurop on Cartoonnetwork.com. As of 2011, "Captain and ToeNeil" has only aired in France, the UK, and Poland during commercial breaks.

No.	Title	Original release date
0	"Pilot"	May 7, 2007
0	"Captain and ToeNeil"	May 7, 2007
Flapjack and Bubbie meet K'nuckles. Flapjack proves that he is an adventurer by beating Eight-Armed Willy at arm wrestling. K'nuckles is cutting his toenails; Flapjack is collecting them to make a ship out of toenails. After Flapjack makes K'nuckles drink whale milk, his toenails grow again.

=== Season 1 (2008–09) ===
The first season of 20 episodes officially premiered with "Several Leagues Above the Sea" and "Eye Sea You" on June 5, 2008, and ended with "Tee Hee Tummy Tums" on July 23, 2009. The segment "That's a Wrap!" aired as a sneak peek on May 26, 2008. "Candy Cruise Blues", "My Guardian Angel Is Killing Me!!", and "Dear Diary" were shown on Comcast On Demand several months before their actual air dates. This is the longest season of the show with each half-hour episode containing two 11-minute segments.

No. overall	No. in season	Title	Creative direction	Written and storyboarded by	Story by	Original release date
1	1	"Several Leagues Under the Sea"	J. G. Quintel	Thurop Van Orman & J. G. Quintel	N/A	June 5, 2008
1	1	"Eye Sea You"	J. G. Quintel	John Infantino & Patrick McHale	N/A	June 5, 2008
After Flapjack brags about Bubbie's speed, he ends up involving himself, K'nuckles, and Bubbie in a race through the Sea of Teeth against an evil inventor and his mechanical Alpha-Whale. While doing their laundry K'nuckles and Flapjack decide to spy on Bubbie, to find out what she does all day.
2	2	"Kid Nickels"	J. G. Quintel	Mike Roth & Pendleton Ward	N/A	June 12, 2008
2	2	"The Sweet Life"	J. G. Quintel	John Infantino & Patrick McHale	N/A	June 12, 2008
K'nuckles bets Flapjack in a poker game, resulting in the two having a falling-out. K'nuckles replaces Flapjack with a young boy named Kid Nickels, while Flapjack becomes a banker's apprentice. K'nuckles ends up missing Flapjack and challenges the banker to win him back. Flapjack and K'nuckles befriend the richest lady in Stormalong, Lady Nickelbottoms, to steal from her mansion (which is made from candy). When their plans go awry, K'nuckles finds himself challenging Lord Nickelbottoms in a candy-based duel to the death.
3	3	"Several Leagues Above the Sea!"	J. G. Quintel	Kent Osborne	N/A	June 19, 2008
3	3	"That's a Wrap!"	J. G. Quintel	J. G. Quintel	N/A	June 19, 2008
The evil inventor's twin brother builds a "Grand Flying Contraption" to impress Bubbie, on whom he has a crush. However, when Bubbie does not return the same feelings (she sees him as a friend, rather than a love interest) he becomes very sad. Because of this, Flapjack and crew are inadvertently led into danger. In a scheme to trade wrappers with Peppermint Larry in exchange for candy, K'nuckles and Flapjack search for a "+" because Peppermint Larry says he will give them 100 pieces of candy in exchange for it. Flapjack catches K'nuckles trading in wrappers for candy and eating it all, which results in the two having a falling-out. K'nuckles goes into the Candy Barrel and sneaks into a room and discovers that Peppermint Larry wants the "+" (which K'nuckles discovers is actually an "x") for his map to Candied Island made out of candy wrappers, which will show him where Candied Island is located. K'nuckles runs out to tell Flapjack and Flapjack rips up the x, mistakenly thinking K'nuckles has come to apologize. K'nuckles tells Flapjack what is going on and Flapjack is horrified. So they take a wrapper and draw an x on it and give it to Peppermint Larry for candy. Peppermint Larry ends up on Pickle Island instead of Candied Island.
4	4	"Shave and a Haircut... Two Friends!"	J. G. Quintel	John Infantino & Kent Osborne	N/A	June 26, 2008
4	4	"Cammie Island"	J. G. Quintel	John Infantino & Patrick McHale	N/A	June 26, 2008
When Captain K'nuckles believes he has found a map to Candied Island, he wants Flapjack to read it to reach their destination. However, Flapjack (in dire need of a haircut) cannot. They go to Doctor Barber for a haircut, only to find that the barber has stolen the map. Captain K'nuckles and Flapjack stow away on a ship that they believe will take them to Candied Island. Instead, they end up on the mysterious Cammie Island; Flapjack befriends the misunderstood (and lonely) monster of the island.
5	5	"Skooled"	J. G. Quintel	Mike Roth & Pendleton Ward	N/A	July 3, 2008
5	5	"Snarked"	J. G. Quintel	Brett Varon	N/A	July 3, 2008
When Flapjack thinks he's unable to tell directions, he and K'nuckles decide to go to school. But K'nuckles finds himself unable to keep up with the other students and later plans to steal the candy rewards that the teacher gives out. However, he finds out something strange about the school. When they assume that Bubbie has been kidnapped by a group of foreign sailors known as the Snarks, Flapjack and K'nuckles sneak aboard their ship to locate her.
6	6	"Foot Burn"	J. G. Quintel	Brett Varon	N/A	July 10, 2008
6	6	"Hand It Over"	J. G. Quintel	John Infantino & Patrick McHale	N/A	July 10, 2008
Flapjack and Captain K'nuckles suffer from a severe case of foot burn (sunburned feet) after sleeping in the sun. On their quest to treat it, they discover a hideous trolley driver whom K'nuckles knew from his past. Captain K'nuckles is accused by a pirate captain of stealing his hand, leading Flapjack to believe that K'nuckles is nothing but a liar. This puts a strain on their friendship, causing everyone else believes that K'nuckles stole from them.
7	7	"How the West Was Fun"	J. G. Quintel	Mike Roth & Pendleton Ward	N/A	July 17, 2008
7	7	"K'nuckles Is a Filthy Rat"	J. G. Quintel	Kent Osborne	N/A	July 17, 2008
For Flapjack's birthday, K'nuckles, Bubbie, and Flapjack sail west in search of Candied Island. Flapjack adopts a rat he rescues from a flood and names it K'nuckles II, but his new pet ends up infecting everyone in Stormalong with the plague.
8	8	"Sittin' Muscle"	J. G. Quintel	Kent Osborne	N/A	July 24, 2008
8	8	"Knot Funny"	J. G. Quintel	Mike Roth & Pendleton Ward	N/A	July 24, 2008
Flapjack, Captain K'nuckles, and Bubbie journey to the Bottom of the World to reclaim K'nuckles' long-lost "sittin' muscle" (his buttocks). When Captain K'nuckles believes he has accidentally cursed Flapjack with the inability to speak he tries to find a cure, only to discover it to be a ruse by Flapjack to attend the local Knot Festival.
9	9	"Lookin' for Love in All the Wrong Barrels"	J. G. Quintel	Mike Roth & Pendleton Ward	N/A	July 31, 2008
9	9	"Beard Buddies"	J. G. Quintel	Mike Roth & Pendleton Ward	N/A	July 31, 2008
After relating a tale that reveals why he doesn't trust women, Captain K'nuckles ends up falling in love with his own reflection, believing it to be a beautiful woman. When Peppermint Larry hosts his annual "Adventure Beard-Off Contest", Captain K'nuckles enters the contest, with Flapjack pretending to be his beard.
10	10	"Pun Times with Punsie McKale"	J. G. Quintel	John Infantino & Patrick McHale	N/A	August 7, 2008
10	10	"Balance"	J. G. Quintel	Brett Varon	N/A	August 7, 2008
Flapjack finds out Peppermint Larry is preparing for the Stormalong Pun-Off, in which he will compete against comedy legend Punsie McKale. After Flapjack and Larry are knocked out by Punsie's puns, K'nuckles steals the show. Flapjack learns to balance a board on the waves (surfing) and becomes Stormalong's biggest film star.
11	11	"Mechanical Genie Island"	J. G. Quintel	Mike Roth & Brett Varon	N/A	August 14, 2008
11	11	"Revenge"	J. G. Quintel	Thurop Van Orman & J. G. Quintel	N/A	August 14, 2008
Flapjack and Captain K'nuckles get stranded on an island inhabited by a mechanical genie; after fishing for food, they discover that not everything is as it seems. Captain K'nuckles tells Flapjack that the more enemies an adventurer have, the greater adventurer he is. This results in Flapjack going on a quest to make enemies and all his plans backfiring.
12	12	"Oh Brother"	J. G. Quintel	John Infantino & Patrick McHale	N/A	August 21, 2008
12	12	"Panfake"	J. G. Quintel	J. G. Quintel & Kent Osborne	N/A	August 21, 2008
Desperate to find a younger sibling after Captain K'nuckles calls him "a baby" out of annoyance, Flapjack asks Bubbie where babies come from and mistakenly adopts a duck as his new "baby brother". When the Candy Barrel is shut down by the Dock Hag due to a misunderstanding, Peppermint Larry tries his hand at puppetry. He eventually finds success with "The Amazing Adventures of Pancake" – a spoof of Flapjack and his adventures, much to Flapjack's dismay.
13	13	"Lead 'Em and Weep"	J. G. Quintel	Mike Roth & Pendleton Ward	N/A	December 4, 2008
13	13	"Sea Urchins"	J. G. Quintel	Alex Hirsch & John Infantino	N/A	December 11, 2008
Believing K'nuckles to be a bad influence Bubbie tells Flapjack to stop following the pirate, but to lead him instead. Unfortunately, after taking the advice of an animal trainer, Flapjack accidentally hypnotizes K'nuckles into believing he is a seal. When Bubbie sends Flapjack and K'nuckles to get shelf polish on the "bad side" of town, they get into trouble with a group of alley kids and ultimately are challenged to a dance-off to get their possessions back.
14	14	"Love Bugs"	J. G. Quintel	Patrick McHale & Somvilay Xayaphone	N/A	February 12, 2009
14	14	"Whale Times"	J. G. Quintel	Kent Osborne, Alex Hirsch, John Infantino, Steve Little, Pendleton Ward & Cindy Morrow	Steve Little	February 12, 2009
Flapjack denies he is in love with Sally Syrup, despite the little red hearts that pop up around his head. Bubbie falls in love with a whale named Harvey, who kidnaps Captain K'nuckles and Flapjack to work in his factory on Laundry Island – unknown to Bubbie, who thinks they are ignoring her.
15	15	"Sea Legs"	J. G. Quintel	Pendleton Ward & Alex Hirsch	N/A	March 5, 2009
15	15	"No Syrup for Old Flapjacks"	J. G. Quintel	Patrick McHale & Somvilay Xayaphone	N/A	March 12, 2009
After Flapjack finds a pair of legs adrift at sea, Captain K'nuckles uses them to terrorize the people of Stormalong Harbor. However, when a sea monster's torso comes to reclaim the legs, a battle for ownership ensues. Flapjack is told by Bubbie the origin of his name before getting his first "special flapjacks". However, Captain K'nuckles forbids Flapjack from eating pancakes without syrup and the two set out to solve the recent syrup shortage.
16	16	"Plant Man"	J. G. Quintel	Kent Osborne	N/A	March 19, 2009
16	16	"Fish Heads"	J. G. Quintel	John Infantino & Ghostshrimp	N/A	March 26, 2009
When Flapjack discovers some fresh fruit (which hasn't been seen in years) and Captain K'Nuckles eats it, the two head to an island to get some more, but a mysterious plant man keeps getting in the way. The Dock Hag catches Flapjack and Captain K'nuckles littering and sentences them to community service collecting fish heads. Doctor Barber offers to pay them for the heads (much to their delight), but they soon discover his true intentions for the fish heads.
17	17	"Something's Amiss"	J. G. Quintel	John Infantino & Kent Osborne	N/A	June 11, 2009
17	17	"Gone Wishin'"	J. G. Quintel	Pendleton Ward & Alex Hirsch	N/A	June 11, 2009
Flapjack keeps getting mistaken for a girl so he and Captain K'nuckles attempt to literally "man him up", only to discover that his voice is the problem. Captain K'nuckles steals a mermaid queen's heart filled with wishes (in the form of candy) so he and Flapjack can go to Candied Island, but they quickly misuse the wishes and learn a terrible secret about the mermaid.
18	18	"Ben Boozled"	J. G. Quintel	John Infantino & Ghostshrimp	N/A	June 18, 2009
18	18	"Candy Cruise Blues"	J. G. Quintel	John Infantino & Ghostshrimp	Kent Osborne	June 25, 2009
Flapjack and Captain K'nuckles are swindled by a mysterious man named Ben Boozle and are forced to work on his ship until Flapjack can achieve the rank of captain. Flapjack and Captain K'nuckles sneak aboard a candy cruise ship, but accidentally anger Poseidon when they destroy the ship's figurehead.
19	19	"My Guardian Angel Is Killing Me!!"	J. G. Quintel	Pendleton Ward & Alex Hirsch	N/A	July 2, 2009
19	19	"Dear Diary"	J. G. Quintel	Patrick McHale & Somvilay Xayaphone	N/A	July 9, 2009
Flapjack is dubbed Captain K'nuckles' guardian angel by Bubbie, but when Flapjack annoys him with constant protection, K'nuckles fakes his own death to have peace. When Captain K'nuckles and Bubbie read Flapjack's secret diary, Flapjack decides to live like a hermit on a remote island to keep his secrets safe.
20	20	"Diamonds in the Stuff"	J. G. Quintel	Pendleton Ward & Alex Hirsch	Kent Osborne	July 16, 2009
20	20	"Tee Hee Tummy Tums"	J. G. Quintel	Patrick McHale & Somvilay Xayaphone	Kent Osborne	July 23, 2009
Taunted by a rich boy for being poor, Flapjack and Captain K'nuckles search for diamonds that the rich boy claims are in the sewers of Upper Stormalong Harbor. Flapjack learns from Captain K'Nuckles about a strange man who trades combs in exchange for candy. After finding the man's family is in a similar situation to his, Flapjack helps the man (Tee Hee Tummy Tums) sell his combs.

=== Season 2 (2009–10) ===
The second season (also consisting of 20 episodes) began on July 30, 2009, with "Jar She Blows!" and "Behind the Curtain", and ended on June 28, 2010, with "A Day Without Laughter". The Christmas special, "Low Tidings", aired on December 3, 2009. "Come Home Cap'n", "Fastest Man Alive", "Oh, You Animal!", and "The Return of Sally Syrup", were shown on Comcast On Demand several months before their actual air dates. This season has a total of 38 episode segments.

No. overall	No. in season	Title	Creative direction	Written and storyboarded by	Story by	Original release date
21	1	"Jar She Blows!"	J. G. Quintel & John Infantino	Sean Szeles & Somvilay Xayaphone	Kent Osborne	July 30, 2009
21	1	"Behind the Curtain"	J. G. Quintel & John Infantino	John Infantino & Cole Sanchez	Jackie Buscarino	July 30, 2009
Captain K'nuckles accidentally gets Flapjack stuck in a jar when trying to get some Candied Island candy. This leads Flapjack on a long journey in an attempt to return home, after being washed out to sea. Flapjack and Captain K'nuckles struggle to escape from the Dock Hag's house after a feeble attempt at sabotaging K'nuckles' dock tickets, only to discover that the Dock Hag has a crush on the old captain.
22	2	"Shut It"	J. G. Quintel & John Infantino	Mike Roth & Nate Cash	Kent Osborne	August 6, 2009
22	2	"Who's Mooching Who?"	J. G. Quintel & John Infantino	Kent Osborne	Jackie Buscarino	August 6, 2009
After an argument involving Bubbie's tooth door, Flapjack and Captain K'nuckles decide to disguise themselves as each other for the day to see whose life is more difficult. When the Dock Hag bans Flapjack and K'nuckles from setting foot on the main harbor until they pay off their tickets, they take in a rich stranger in the hope he will pay them for being such kind friends. However, they rethink their idea when the stranger begins to take advantage of their hospitality.
23	3	"Over the Moon"	J. G. Quintel & John Infantino	Sean Szeles & Somvilay Xayaphone	Steve Little	August 13, 2009
23	3	"100 Percensus"	J. G. Quintel & John Infantino	John Infantino & Cole Sanchez	Steve Little	August 13, 2009
When Flapjack and Captain K'nuckles are stranded on the moon after getting chased by Eight-Armed Willy, they discover that it could lead them to Candied Island. All they need to do is trick the moon (who, they discovered, has a mind of its own) into taking them there. Captain K'nuckles refuses to take a census conducted by Flapjack, due to a misunderstanding. Unfortunately, the census takers who assigned this duty to Flapjack are actually a group of pirates wanting to take over Stormalong.
24	4	"Off with His Hat"	J. G. Quintel & John Infantino	Kent Osborne	Jackie Buscarino	August 20, 2009
24	4	"K'nuckles and His Hilarious Problem"	J. G. Quintel & John Infantino	Mike Roth & Ghostshrimp	Steve Little	August 20, 2009
When Flapjack helps Captain K'nuckles look for his lost hat on an island filled with chimpanzees, they end up encountering a researcher living among them. With her help, they must reach the "secret meeting place": an active volcano whose crater K'nuckles must cross so he can get his hat back. Flapjack tries to break Captain K'nuckles' candy addiction after he develops a severe case of "candy rot".
25	5	"Fancy Pants"	J. G. Quintel & John Infantino	Sean Szeles & Somvilay Xayaphone	Steve Little	August 27, 2009
25	5	"Cuddle Trouble"	J. G. Quintel & John Infantino	John Infantino & Cole Sanchez	Kent Osborne	September 3, 2009
K'nuckles needs to get fancy pants to get into the new VIP section of the Candy Barrel. Flapjack finds he may have a problem with cuddling after a night sleeping outside, so he tries to find the cause and a cure.
26	6	"Who's That Man in the Mirror?"	J. G. Quintel & John Infantino	J. G. Quintel	Jackie Buscarino	September 10, 2009
26	6	"Unhappy Endings"	J. G. Quintel & John Infantino	Kent Osborne & Mike Roth	Kent Osborne	September 17, 2009
When K'nuckles refuses to lose weight, he risks losing Flapjack to a real adventurer. Tired of stories with happy endings, K'nuckles and Flapjack go off in search of a story without one, but their imaginations quickly run wild.
27	7	"S.S. K'nuckies"	J. G. Quintel & John Infantino	Sean Szeles & Somvilay Xayaphone	Kent Osborne	September 24, 2009
27	7	"Candy Casanova"	J. G. Quintel & John Infantino	John Infantino & Cole Sanchez	Steve Little	October 1, 2009
Bubbie becomes jealous of K'nuckles' new boat, while unbeknownst to the trio, the boat's original owner seeks to kill Flapjack and K'nuckles. Flapjack keeps an eye on Candy Wife while Peppermint Larry is out of town, making Captain K'nuckles jealous.
28	8	"Down with the Ship"	J. G. Quintel & John Infantino	Kent Osborne & Mike Roth	Jackie Buscarino	October 8, 2009
28	8	"Willy!"	J. G. Quintel & John Infantino	Sean Szeles & Somvilay Xayaphone	Kent Osborne	October 15, 2009
K'nuckles tries to prove he's a captain by visiting a sunken ship to collect his captain's papers. Flapjack has to capture Eight-Armed Willy to prove he is worthy of being a real adventurer.
29	9	"Bubbie's Tummy Ache"	J. G. Quintel & John Infantino	John Infantino & Cole Sanchez	Steve Little	October 22, 2009
29	9	"Mind the Store, Don't Look in the Drawer"	J. G. Quintel & John Infantino	Kent Osborne & Mike Roth	Steve Little	October 29, 2009
When Bubbie gets a stomach ache, Flapjack must go on a dangerous journey into her stomach to fix it. Dr. Barber leaves Flapjack and K'nuckles to look after his barbershop/clinic with one important rule: they must not open a drawer. As a result, they are very curious about what is in the drawer.
30	10	"Please Retire!"	J. G. Quintel & John Infantino	Chris Reccardi	Jackie Buscarino	November 5, 2009
30	10	"Under the Sea Monster"	J. G. Quintel & John Infantino	Nate Cash	Kent Osborne	November 12, 2009
K'nuckles and Flapjack visit a storytelling club, where K'nuckles finds out that his own stories may be outdated. When Flapjack pulls a sea monster-related prank on K'nuckles, the citizens of Stormalong banish him from the harbor by throwing him into the ocean, leaving Flapjack to try to get him back.
31	11	"Flapjack Goes to a Party"	J. G. Quintel & John Infantino	Sean Szeles & Somvilay Xayaphone	Jackie Buscarino	November 19, 2009
31	11	"Rye Ruv Roo"	J. G. Quintel & John Infantino	John Infantino & Cole Sanchez	Kent Osborne & Jackie Buscarino	December 10, 2009
Flapjack gets invited to a birthday party, but feels embarrassed when the other kids perceive K'nuckles and Bubbie as "weirdos". Flapjack pretends to be a dog for Lady Nicklebottoms, while K'nuckles experiences the joys of owning a dog.
32	12	"Low Tidings"	J. G. Quintel & John Infantino	John Infantino, Kent Osborne & Cole Sanchez	Kent Osborne	December 3, 2009
Flapjack celebrates Low Tide Day and awaits his gifts from Poseidon, while K'nuckles tries to find a place to hide from the mermen for being a naughty person. Note: This is the first half-hour special to air.
33	13	"Come Home, Cap'n"	J. G. Quintel & John Infantino	Sean Szeles & Somvilay Xayaphone	Kent Osborne	March 4, 2010
33	13	"Fastest Man Alive"	J. G. Quintel & John Infantino	Mike Roth & Benton Connor	Kent Osborne & Steve Little	March 11, 2010
Bubbie kicks K'nuckles out, and Flapjack tries to reconcile the two. When the fat police constable (called Constable Norm in later episodes) creates the first bicycle in Stormalong, Flapjack and K'nuckles find it difficult to get away with mischief, especially when the constable begins to abuse his authority and punish them severely for minor offenses.
34	14	"Oh You Animal!"	John Infantino	Mike Roth & Benton Connor	Kent Osborne & Jackie Buscarino	March 18, 2010
34	14	"The Return of Sally Syrup"	John Infantino	Kent Osborne & Derek Evanick	Jackie Buscarino	April 5, 2010
Bubbie (and eventually K'nuckles) tries to rescue Flapjack from an old woman, who thinks he's a missing child. Sally Syrup returns to Stormalong (much to her dismay) and Flapjack must convince her that Stormalong is not all that bad.
35	15	"Lazy Bones"	John Infantino	John Infantino & Cole Sanchez	Steve Little	April 12, 2010
35	15	"Two Old Men and a Lock Box"	John Infantino	Mike Roth & Benton Connor	Steve Little	April 19, 2010
When K'nuckles wins a contest for being Stormalong's laziest man, the original owner of the title gets revenge by kidnapping Flapjack. Flapjack and K'nuckles attempt to befriend two old men who possess a treasure chest from Candied Island.
36	16	"Bam!"	John Infantino	Cole Sanchez & Derek Evanick	Kent Osborne	April 26, 2010
36	16	"Lost at Land"	John Infantino	Sean Szeles & Somvilay Xayaphone	Kent Osborne	May 3, 2010
K'nuckles is bullied by a group of sailors in the Candy Barrel, and Flapjack tries to convince him he is not a wimp. K'nuckles and Flapjack are stranded on a strange island and are unable to find the ocean.
37	17	"Just One Kiss"	John Infantino	Mike Roth & Benton Connor	Jackie Buscarino	May 10, 2010
37	17	"Wishing Not so Well"	John Infantino	Pete Browngardt & Max Winston	Kent Osborne	May 17, 2010
K'nuckles challenges Peppermint Larry to a game of pool to settle the ownership of Candy Wife. K'nuckles' wish that everyone in Stormalong would disappear comes true, but he soon begins to regret his wish.
38	18	"N Is for Navy"	John Infantino	Cole Sanchez & Derek Evanick	Steve Little	May 24, 2010
38	18	"What's Eatin' Ya, Cap'm?"	John Infantino	Pete Browngardt & Max Winston	Kent Osborne & Sean Szeles	May 31, 2010
Flapjack joins the navy to prove K'nuckles he has a life, only to find it's not exciting as he thought it was. K'nuckles becomes infested with termites.
39	19	"I'm so Proud... of Me"	John Infantino	Mike Roth & Benton Connor	Kent Osborne	June 7, 2010
39	19	"A Day Without Laughter"	John Infantino	Sean Szeles & Somvilay Xayaphone	Steve Little	June 28, 2010
Flapjack becomes upset when an embarrassing picture of him appears in the paper. Flapjack tries to help Lolly Poopdeck get respect when he gets tired of being a laughingstock.
40	20	"All Hands on Deck"	John Infantino	Sean Szeles & Somvilay Xayaphone	Kent Osborne	June 21, 2010
There are dire consequences when Flapjack switches places with a sailor. Note: This is the second and last half-hour special to air.

=== Season 3 (2010) ===
The third and final season began on July 5, 2010, with "Careful What You Fish For" and "Mayor May Not", Series creator Thurop Van Orman and his son Leif Van Orman guest-starred as live action K'nuckles and Flapjack in the series finale. This is the shortest season of the series, counting only six half-hour episodes. Each episode contains two 11-minute segments like the first season.

Writer and storyboard artist Noel Belknap confirmed on LinkedIn that the season was storyboarded from August to December 2009. The series wrapped production the following year.

No. overall	No. in season	Title	Creative direction	Written and storyboarded by	Story by	Original release date
41	1	"Careful What You Fish For"	John Infantino	Cole Sanchez & Noel Belknap	Dave Tennant	July 5, 2010
41	1	"Mayor May Not"	John Infantino	Sean Szeles & Benton Connor	Sean Szeles	July 12, 2010
When Peppermint Larry falls sick, Flapjack and K'nuckles are forced to go fishing for food. K'nuckles becomes the new mayor of Stormalong.
42	2	"I'm a Believer"	John Infantino	John Infantino & Brett Varon	Sean Szeles	July 19, 2010
42	2	"Liar, Liar, You for Hire?"	John Infantino	Brett Varon	Sean Szeles	July 26, 2010
When K'nuckles continues to trick people and blame ghosts, Flapjack consults Jayde, the resident ghost expert of Stormalong, to see if ghosts really do exist. K'nuckles claims he knows where Candied Island is, but gets caught up in his lie.
43	3	"Candy Colleague"	John Infantino	Cole Sanchez & David C. Smith	Sean Szeles	August 2, 2010
43	3	"These Boots Were Made for Walking (On Your Face)"	John Infantino	Tom King & Noel Belknap	Dave Tennant	August 9, 2010
Flapjack makes Doctor Barber a friend out of candy. K'nuckles gets a new face to avoid a mob after stealing boots, but ends up caught in the mob.
44	4	"High Landlubber"	John Infantino	Piero Piluso & Benton Connor	Dave Tennant	August 16, 2010
44	4	"Who Let the Cats Out of the Old Bag's House?"	John Infantino	Tom King & Noel Belknap	Sean Szeles	August 16, 2010
The outrageous adventurer Ponce de Lee-Roy convinces K'nuckles he's an immortal. Flapjack causes an infestation of non-lucky cats in Stormalong, leaving him and K'nuckles to fix the problem.
45	5	"Parfait Storm"	John Infantino	Ako Castuera	Dave Tennant	August 23, 2010
45	5	"K'nuckles, Don't Be a Hero"	John Infantino	Cole Sanchez & David C. Smith	Dave Tennant	August 23, 2010
When a storm hits Stormalong, Flapjack and K'nuckles offer to help the town in exchange for candy. Flapjack and K'nuckles wreak havoc on civilization in the clouds. Note: This episode is known on iTunes as "Balloon Buoy".
46	6	"Catch Me If You Candy"	John Infantino	Piero Piluso & Benton Connor	Dave Tennant	August 31, 2010
46	6	"Fish Out of Water"	John Infantino	Tom King & Noel Belknap	Dave Tennant	August 31, 2010
Flapjack tries to clear K'nuckles' name when he is accused of stealing candy. Flapjack and K'nuckles consume too much of a new drink at the Candy Barrel, and it turns them into fish.
