= Downtown Independent =

Movie theater in Los Angeles

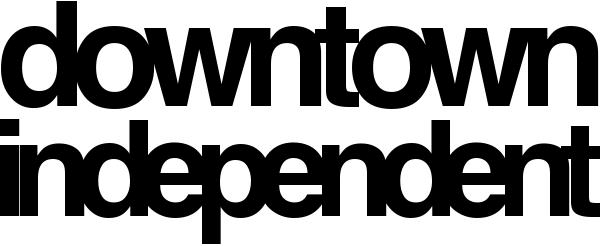

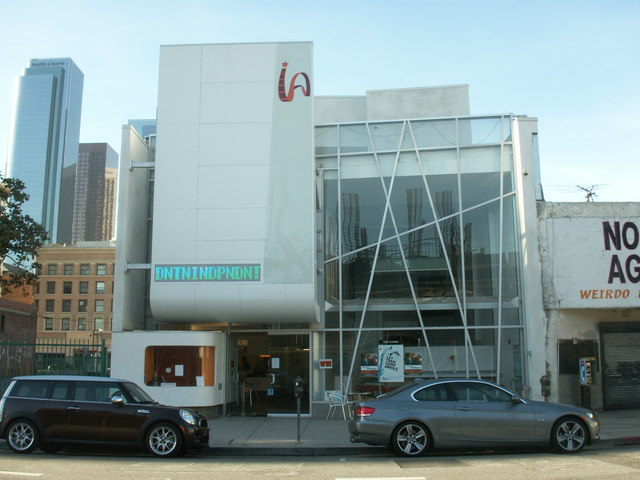
- Interactive map of Downtown Independent
- Former names: Arrow Theater; Aztec Theater; Linda Lea Theatre; ImaginAsian Center
- Address: 251 S. Main Street; Los Angeles, CA
- Coordinates: 34.0502°N 118.2456°W
- Capacity: 500 (1924), 222 (2007)
- Screen: 1

Construction
- Built: October 1924
- Opened: 1924 (as Arrow Theater)
- Renovated: December 1, 2007
- Closed: March 17, 2020
- Years active: 1924–c. 1980, 2007–2020
- Architects: John E. Kunst (1924); Hodgetts + Fung (2007)
- General contractors: A.A. Laisy & Co. (1924)

Website
- downtownindependent.com

Downtown Independent (formerly Arrow Theater, Azteca and Aztec Theater, Linda Lea Theater, and ImaginAsian Center) was a one screen theater and cinema located at 251 S. Main Street in the downtown area of Los Angeles, California. It was operated by the Downtown Independent and owned by Orange County, California's Cinema Properties Group.

The venue is slightly less than 10,000 square feet (930 m^{2}) and had stadium seating for 222. Film premieres at the theater include The Miracle Song, Goodbye Promise and Regular Show: The Movie.

== History ==
The first theater on the site of the current Downtown Independent opened in 1924 as Arrow Theater. The original owner, George Carpenter, had commissioned John E. Kunst to design a picture theater. The building included a pipe organ, two stores, and auditorium seating for 500.

Under a new manager, Frank Fouce, the theater began to focus on Latin American films in the late 1930s. It was renamed on March 24, 1940 to the Azteca (later Aztec). The Aztec hosted burlesque shows in 1941 and 1942.

The theater was renamed Linda Lea Theater in 1945, after which, it focused on Japanese films. The theater was especially popular in the 1960s; however, the Linda Lea began declining in the 1980s. The theater closed and the building was bought by the Metropolitan News-Enterprise for use as an archive, but it fell into disuse and began to decay.

Cinema Properties Group purchased the theater in 2005 and following extensive renovations, it re-opened as the ImaginAsian Center in 2007. A year later, it was rebranded as the Downtown Independent. This theater closed in 2020 due to the COVID-19 pandemic.

== Gallery ==
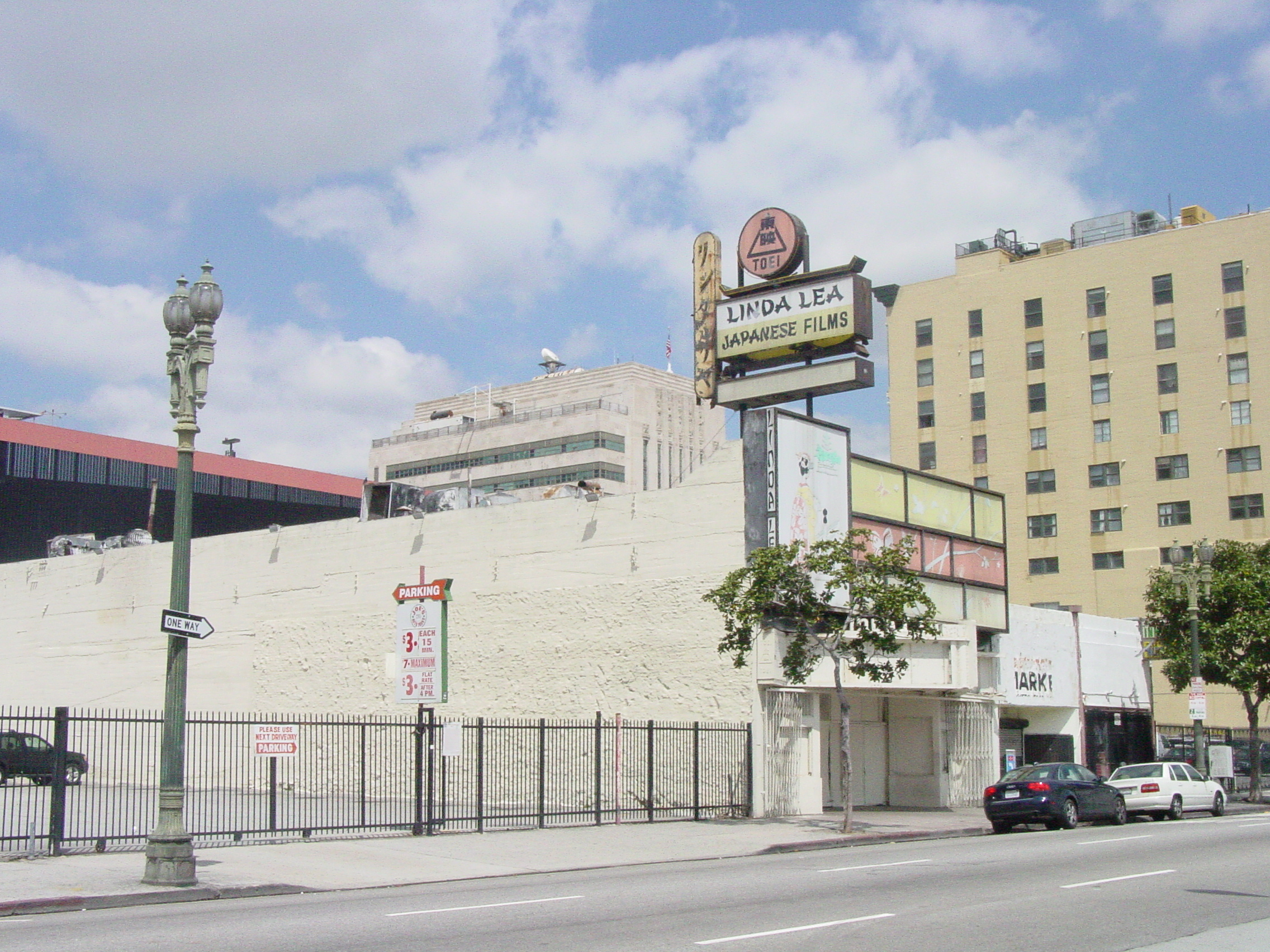
Linda Lea Theater (2006)

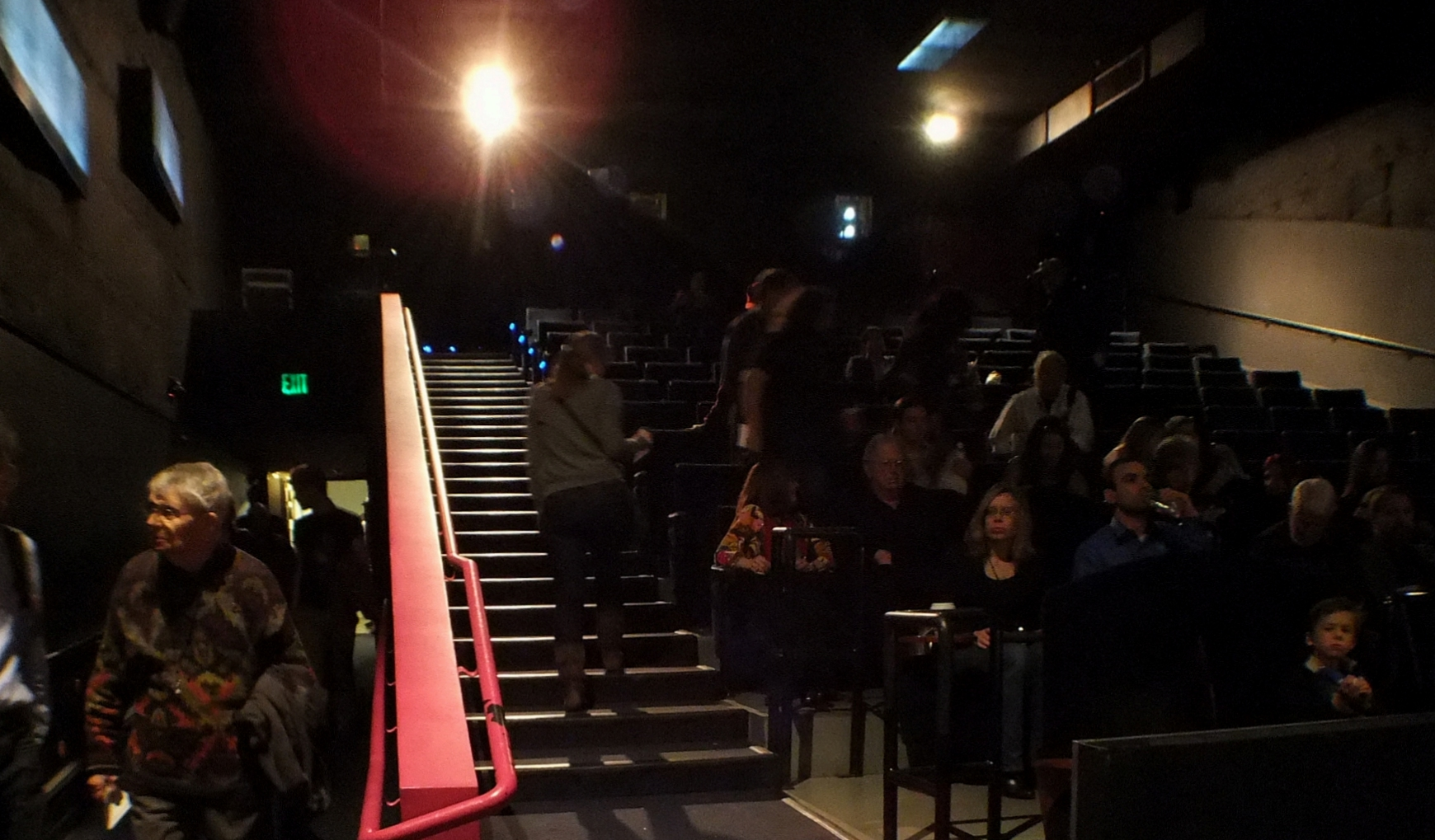
Interior (2013)
