= The Cartoonstitute =

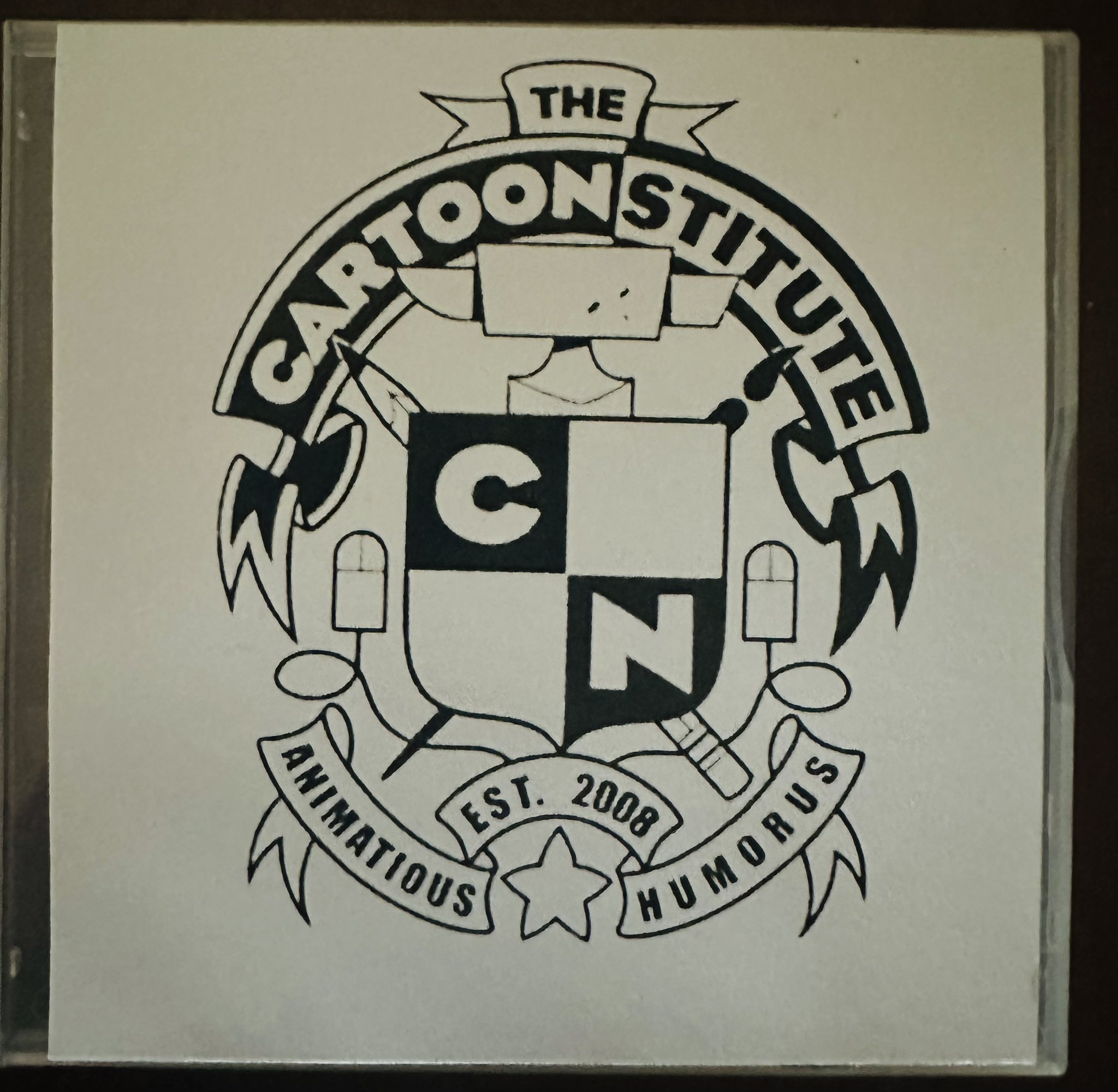
- Created by: Rob Sorcher
- Starring: Various
- Composer: Various
- Country of origin: United States
- Original language: English
- No. of episodes: 14 (only 5 2/3 completed)

Production
- Executive producers: Rob Sorcher; Craig McCracken; Rob Renzetti
- Producers: Janet Dimon; Nate Funaro
- Running time: 22 minutes (3x7 minutes)
- Production company: Cartoon Network Studios

Original release
- Network: Cartoon Network Video
- Release: May 7, 2010

Related
- What a Cartoon!; Cartoon Network Shorts Department; Cartoon Cartoons; Regular Show; Uncle Grandpa; Secret Mountain Fort Awesome

The Cartoonstitute is a Cartoon Network project created by Cartoon Network's executive Rob Sorcher that would have been a showcase for animated shorts created without the interference of network executives and focus testing. It was headed by Craig McCracken (creator of The Powerpuff Girls, and Foster's Home for Imaginary Friends) and Rob Renzetti (creator of My Life as a Teenage Robot). Thirty-nine shorts for the project were in development at Cartoon Network Studios, but only 14 of these were completed. Eventually, balancing 5 upcoming shows and adding another proved difficult and the project was scrapped. Of all the shorts that were made, only Regular Show and Uncle Grandpa got greenlit to become full animated series. On May 7, 2010, Cartoon Network released nearly all of the shorts to their website. The only shorts not released were Maruined, 3 Dog Band, and Joey to the World.

== History ==
The series was first announced on April 3, 2008, at Cartoon Network's annual upfront in New York City. The project was to be similar to The Cartoon Cartoon Show (also known as the What a Cartoon! Show), which aired on the network more than a decade earlier and gave birth to some of the channel's first animated series, such as Dexter's Laboratory, The Powerpuff Girls and Cow and Chicken. The Cartoonstitute was to establish a think tank and create an environment in which animators can create characters and stories. A section of Cartoon Network Studios in Burbank, was set aside exclusively for the project. The "Cartoonstitute" name came up by Lauren Faust, the wife of Craig McCracken. The first short to appear legally online via Vimeo was "3 Dog Band: Get It Together" on July 29, 2009. On September 26, 2009, all 14 completed shorts were posted on YouTube and the account was deleted shortly after posting them.

== List of completed shorts ==
All shorts of the project were developed and produced in 2009, despite their release in 2010.

| Title | Created by | Synopsis | Voice Cast |
|---|---|---|---|
| "3 Dog Band: Get It Together" | Paul Rudish | A trio of dogs (that consists of a German-accented Afghan Hound interested in synth-pop named Stavros, a cupcake-loving drummer beagle named Loubie and a dachshund interested in funk named Sly, prepare for a gig at an exclusive nightclub, with some minor difficulty along the way. | Jeff Bennett as Stavros; Dee Bradley Baker as Loubie; Phil LaMarr as Sly; John DiMaggio as Mr. Pinkwater |
| "Baloobaloob's Fun Park" | Aaron Springer | Two teenage workers, Andy and Jeff, must help an extraterrestrial named Baloobaloob come up with an extraordinary stage act in an attempt to prevent his amusement park from closing. | Dee Bradley Baker as Andy, Baloobaloob, Narrator; Tom Kenny as Jeff, Male Audience Members; Maurice LaMarche as Mr. Linster, Male Audience Members |
| "Danger Planet" | Derek Drymon | When an arcade machine of the Danger Planet game and a forklift robot get stranded on a planet inhabited by carnivorous cyclops-like aliens that can shapeshift, they take it upon themselves to protect a human baby thanks to the spaceship captain who will make sure that they do not leave the planet on her watch. The short was re-released in 2016 under the Cartoon Network Shorts Department with brighter colors. | Dana Snyder as Danger Planet; Tom Kenny as Forklift; Dee Bradley Baker as Baby; Maria Bamford as Captain; Gary Anthony Williams as Alien |
| "Joey to the World" | Craig Kellman | A immature kangaroo decides to leave his mother's pouch in Australia on his 35th birthday to the Alaskan wilderness. | Mr. Lawrence as Joey, Radio Announcer; Estelle Harris as Joey's Mom; Tom Kenny as Snow Monster, Arcade Employee |
| "Le Door" | Matt Danner | A French inter-dimensional adventurer named Le Door (a parody of Doraemon) takes his young apprentice Frank on a tour through his old academy, only to enter a competition against his old sidekick-turned-rival Zee Window and his apprentice Zee Donut Hole. | René Auberjonois as Le Door; Jayden Monick as Frank; Eric Bauza as Zee Window; Matt Danner as Zee Donut Hole |
| "Maruined" | Genndy Tartakovsky | Two siblings, a teenage girl and her hip-hop loving younger brother Zack, become trapped on a dangerous deserted island with a playful elephant-like creature named Snortafus. This short was planned to air on Cartoon Network Latin America in 2017, but it was cancelled due to technical problems and was later posted to YouTube. | Grey DeLisle as Girl; Maria Bamford as Zack; Tom Kenny as Ship Servant; Frank Welker as Snortafus |
| "Meddlen Meadows" | Chris Reccardi | In a planet inhabited by primitive aliens who attempt to sacrifice a green sheep-like creature, a smooth-talking space adventurer named Bacculas has difficulty to escape after the power cell of his spaceship gets stolen by the primitives. | Paul Rugg as Bacculas, Stick Native; Dee Bradley Baker as Round Creature; Kevin Michael Richardson as Red Native, Bush Troll |
| "Regular Show" | J. G. Quintel | On their first day working at the park, Mordecai the blue jay and Rigby the raccoon compete against each other over their friend Pops' old chair by playing rock-paper-scissors, but it is revealed to be an evil game when they tie 100 times in a row, spawning a portal-absorbing monster intent on eating the couch. This short serves as the pilot to the series of the same name, Regular Show. The short was later retooled into the season 2 episode "First Day". | J. G. Quintel as Mordecai; William Salyers as Rigby; Sam Marin as Benson, Pops; Mark Hamill as Skips; Roger L. Jackson as Portal-Absorbing Monster |
| "Spleenstab" | Mike Bell | A barbarian attempts to become a kind and gentle person with the help of a forest elf. | Mike Bell as Spleenstab; Jeff Bennett as Treewise, Twinkle; Tom Kenny as Brownie, Cake Troll |
| "Stockboys of the Apocalypse" | Derek Drymon | A teenage worker of the department store Hoggly Woggly falls into a time machine to the future, where department store duty is the least of his worries. | Alexander Polinsky as Dude; Steve Little as Buddy; Dee Bradley Baker as Normal Woggy, Mutants; John DiMaggio as Mutant Woggy |
| "The Awesome Chronicles of Manny and Khan: Lava Ball! The Ashes of Heroes" | Josh Lieberman and Joey Giardina (credited as "Josh and Joey") | A German-accented leprechaun named Khan and a giant platypus named Manny attempt to retrieve a ball, pretending that the patch of grass surrounding it is lava. | Adam Paul as Manny; Keith Ferguson as Khan |
| "The Borneos" | Chris Staples | The son of a circus family must undergo training to prevent the family title of the "Walla Walla Wildman" from being taken. | Dee Bradley Baker as Jo, The Wildman, Walla Walla Weirdo, Squirrel, Teensy Tom; Candi Milo as Po; Maurice LaMarche as Unkle Pickle, Clown Host; Kari Wahlgren as Audience Member |
| "Uncle Grandpa" | Pete Browngardt | A strange man who is the uncle and grandfather of everyone in the world must do battle with a gang of monsters from another dimension called Disgustoids, after an attempt to gain the appreciation and love of a nerdy teenager named Ham Sandwich goes awry. This short is the pilot to the series of the same name, Uncle Grandpa, as well as Secret Mountain Fort Awesome, which stars the Disgustoids. In 2010, the short was nominated for Outstanding Short-Format Animated Program at the Emmy Awards. | Pete Browngardt as Uncle Grandpa; Steve Blum as Ham Sandwich; Grey DeLisle as Judy Jones |
| "YES" | David P. Smith (credited as Dave Smith) | A merman enlists a family from the countryside to assist him in an effort to help people realize and fulfill their dreams. | Tom Kenny as Edwin; Daran Norris as Bob; Grey DeLisle as Alastair, Mom, Gam Gams; David P. Smith as Robot Butler |

=== Rejected/Unproduced ===
While there are 25 unfinished shorts that remain unreleased, there are currently six known pitches/concepts for The Cartoonstitute that may or may not have had their pilot produced (making a total of 18 remaining unknown pitches).

| Title | Created by | Synopsis |
|---|---|---|
| "Dynamite Jones" | Andy Suriano | A Luke Cage-alike figure tries to get back to fighting crimes with his son. Originally pitched to BET. |
| "When Nature Calls" | Mike Milo | Two dimwits named Woodrow and Mr. Flint help Mother Nature set up the earth each day for humans. |
| "Thundermanns" | Stephen DeStefano | Synopsis unknown. |
| "The Sloppy Seconds" | Greg Arya | Synopsis unknown but some storyboards exist. |
| "The Brand New Super Crazies" | Greg Miller | Synopsis unknown. |
| "Star and the Forces of Evil" | Daron Nefcy | A 6th grader with no friends is sent far away from the galaxy to Earth to fight the forces of evil. This pitch was not picked up by Cartoon Network, but was later picked up by Disney, becoming Star vs. the Forces of Evil. |
