= J. G. Quintel =

American animator

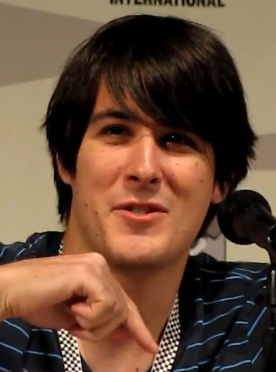
- Quintel in 2011
- Born: James Garland Quintel; Hanford, California, U.S.
- Education: CalArts (BFA)
- Occupations: Animator; storyboard artist; director; writer; producer; voice actor
- Years active: 2004–present
- Known for: Regular Show; Close Enough; Camp Lazlo; The Marvelous Misadventures of Flapjack
- Spouse: Cassia Streb (m. 2010)
- Children: 1

James Garland Quintel is an American voice actor, animator, storyboard artist, director, writer and producer. He created the Cartoon Network series Regular Show (2010–2017), in which he voiced Mordecai and Hi-Five Ghost, and the HBO Max series Close Enough (2020–2022), in which he voiced Josh.

Quintel served as a creative director for Thurop Van Orman's The Marvelous Misadventures of Flapjack (2008–2010), as well as writer and storyboard artist for Joe Murray's Camp Lazlo (2006–2008), both of which aired on Cartoon Network. In 2009, he was nominated for the Annie Award for Directing in a Television Production for directing an episode of Flapjack. In 2012, he received an Emmy Award for Outstanding Short-format Animated Program category for Regular Show.

== Early life and education ==
James Garland Quintel was born in Hanford, California to Terri (née Morris) and James Allen Quintel. According to Quintel, Hanford's geography is "kind of flat" and there "was not a ton to do" when he was growing up, so he and his friends were always looking for ways to entertain themselves; he later incorporated these kinds of misadventures into Regular Show.

Quintel often played the video game ToeJam & Earl, the influence of which he later described as "the perfect platform" for Regular Show protagonists Mordecai and Rigby. He also became influenced by rock music from the 1980s and later added 1980s music into Regular Show. He attended Hanford High School. In 1998, when he was 16, his father gave him a video camera which he used (along with Lego men and crude paper cutouts) to create a few minutes of stop motion film for several short film projects at Hanford High School. To expand his artistry, he took an AP literature class and a pottery class at Hanford High, as well as a summer class where he learned how to animate films and make flip books. He also worked at a movie theater and at "a lot of minimum wage jobs", just as Mordecai and Rigby work for minimum wage at a park in Regular Show. In May 2000, he was nominated as a 12th grade California academic all-star from Hanford High.

After high school, Quintel briefly attended College of the Sequoias and College of the Canyons before later transferring to California Institute of the Arts in Santa Clarita, California. At CalArts, Quintel and about 20 fellow students, including now-voice artist Sam Marin, developed their short films by throwing title names (such as "lollypop" or "candy") into a hat, drawing them out, and reading them aloud at midnight as a warm-up, where they would each then rush back to their desks in a marathon effort to make a film in 48 hours based on the one word drawn. In the spring of 2005, this CalArts process led Quintel to put together a short animated film about an ambassador who loses his cool during a benign encounter. Quintel titled his new film The Naive Man from Lolliland. Moreover, as Quintel's first exposure to the animation industry, Quintel obtained a 2004 internship at Cartoon Network Studios to work on Genndy Tartakovsky's Star Wars: Clone Wars TV series. At CalArts, Quintel would also meet another student by the name of Pendleton Ward, with whom he would later work with on the Cartoon Network series The Marvelous Misadventures of Flapjack. Ward would later use his experience from Flapjack to go on to create the Emmy Award-winning Cartoon Network series Adventure Time.

While at college, He was introduced to some British shows such as The Mighty Boosh, The IT Crowd, The League of Gentlemen, and Blackadder.

During the fall of Quintel's fourth year at CalArts, The Naive Man from Lolliland won both the Producers Choice Award (an Apple G5 computer and a copy of Bauhaus Software's Mirage animation software) and the Student Animator Award (US$1,000 and a copy of Softimage XSI 3D computer graphics software) at the 2005 Nextoons Nicktoons Film Festival. In response to Quintel's success at the 2005 Nicktoons Film Festival, Fred Seibert, an entertainment entrepreneur and television and film producer, identified Quintel as "an original talent to watch out for in the future". Quintel's hometown local newspaper, the Hanford Sentinel, noted Quintel's success at the 2005 Nicktoons Film Festival as being one of 2005's moments from a memorable year. In December 2005, Quintel graduated from the California Institute of the Arts with a BFA degree in character animation.

A lifelong fan of video games, Quintel stated that he would play titles such as Psycho Fox and Street Fighter. In a 2012 interview with Animation Magazine, Quintel cited Matt Groening's The Simpsons, Murray's Rocko's Modern Life and Mike Judge's Beavis and Butthead as influences on his comedic timing and sensibilities.

== Career ==
After graduating, Quintel passed a test and began working as a storyboard revisionist for Cartoon Network's Camp Lazlo. In May 2006, Nicktoons Network announced that Quintel would be one of six judges at the 3rd Annual Nicktoons Network Animation Festival. In 2007, Quintel entered his short film, 2 in the AM PM, in the 30th annual Spike & Mike's Sick and Twisted Festival of Animation. In 2 in the AM PM, two slackers are left alone to run a convenience store/gas station on Halloween night, where candy filled with drugs creates a mini-nightmare. Quintel later used some of these 2 in the AM PM characters in Regular Show.

In 2008, Quintel pitched Regular Show for the Cartoonstitute project at Cartoon Network by using a storyboard, with his reasoning that "I don't think me verbally pitching such an odd concept would have made any sense to anyone." In August 2009, Cartoon Network ordered more episodes of The Marvelous Misadventures of Flapjack as well as greenlit Quintel's project, Regular Show. The agreement upon the premise of Regular Show was that the series would be about two park groundskeepers, Mordecai (a 6-foot blue jay) and Rigby (a hyperactive raccoon), who try to entertain themselves at their jobs while doing anything they can to avoid work and escape their everyday boredom. Along with his success at getting approval to develop Regular Show, in December 2009, Quintel and director John Infantino were nominated for an ASIFA-Hollywood Annie Award in the category of "Directing in a Television Production" for their directing work on the Candy Casanova episode in Season 2 of The Marvelous Misadventures of Flapjack. However, American animation director and fellow CalArts graduate Bret Haaland subsequently took the director Annie Award in February 2010 for Haaland's work on The Penguins of Madagascar – Launchtime. Nine months after Quintel was nominated for an Annie Award, Regular Show debuted at 8:15 P.M. EST on September 6, 2010. In September 2011, while the first season of Regular Show was being aired, Quintel was nominated for a Primetime Emmy Award in the Outstanding Short-format Animated Program category as executive producer and creator of Regular Show. However, his Regular Show series was beat out for the award by the ABC animated special, Disney Prep & Landing: Operation Secret Santa.

By March 2012, Quintel was directing a crew of about 35 to develop each episode of Regular Show, which takes about nine months to go from idea to final product. Quintel has most recently worked for Cartoon Network Studios in Burbank, California developing episodes for Regular Show and provided his real voice to the 23-year-old blue jay Regular Show character Mordecai. In commenting on his voice acting, Quintel noted how he has an easy-going nature and never yells in real life, so he had to learn how to yell as the Mordecai character. Quintel also directed Regular Show: The Movie, the film premiered on August 14, 2015, at The Downtown Independent theater in Los Angeles, where it was shown until August 20, 2015. It then had a DVD release and a primer on Cartoon Network in November.

Following Regular Show's conclusion in January 2017, Quintel announced the creation of Close Enough, an adult animated series about a young couple and their daughter in Los Angeles. The show was inspired by Quintel's own experiences of becoming a young father and trying to balance work with the commitments of marriage and parenthood. "As we were wrapping up Regular Show in 2017, I was looking for new ideas. The first show coincided with me having a job and being out of college, and Close Enough is about getting married, starting a family, trying to buy a house. It's about transitioning from being just yourself and doing whatever you want to taking care of other people in your life." The series was initially expected to premiere later in 2017 as part of a planned adult animation block on TBS. However, the cornerstone of that block was a Louis C.K.-helmed series called The Cops, and when C.K. admitted to sexual misconduct earlier that summer TBS re-tooled their entire schedule, shunting Close Enough into development hell despite having its entire first season produced. It was later resurrected when TBS' parent company WarnerMedia Entertainment announced the launch of a streaming service, HBO Max, that would feature original exclusive content.

On June 12, 2024, Warner Bros. Discovery announced that Regular Show would be getting a new series with Quintel returning as showrunner. In the same month, it was announced that Quintel will also serve as showrunner for an adult television adaption of Jillian Tamaki's webcomic, SuperMutant Magic Academy, for Adult Swim.

== Personal life ==
Quintel married Cassia Streb in 2010. The couple have one child together.

Quintel is an enjoyer of music and technology from the 1970s and 1980s; he made many references to both in Regular Show.

== Filmography ==
=== Film ===
Year	Title	Director	Writer	Producer	Storyboard Artist	Actor	Role	Notes
2005	The Naive Man from Lolliland	Yes	Yes	Yes	Yes	No		Short film
2006	2 in the AM PM	Yes	Yes	Yes	Yes	Yes	Gas Station Employee #1	Short film
2008	Horton Hears a Who!	No	No	No	Yes	No		Additional storyboard artist
2015	Regular Show: The Movie	Yes	Yes	Yes	Yes	Yes	Mordecai, Hi-Five Ghost	Executive producer

=== Television ===
Year	Title	Creator	Director	Writer	Executive Producer	Storyboard Artist	Actor	Role	Notes
2004	Star Wars: Clone Wars	No	No	No	No	Yes	No		Apprentice storyboard revisionist
2005–2008	Camp Lazlo	No	Yes	Yes	No	Yes	No		Storyboard revisionist
2008	Phineas and Ferb	No	No	Yes	No	Yes	No		Episode: "Jerk De Soleil"
2008–2010	The Marvelous Misadventures of Flapjack	No	Yes	Yes	No	Yes	No		Creative director, story
2010, 2017	Adventure Time	No	No	Yes	No	Yes	Yes	Blue Jay	Wrote and storyboarded: "Ocean of Fear"; Voice: "Ketchup"
2010–2017	Regular Show	Yes	Yes	Yes	Yes	Yes	Yes	Mordecai, Hi-Five Ghost, Additional Voices	
2012	Hall of Game Awards	No	No	No	No	No	Yes	Mordecai	
2016	The Amazing World of Gumball	No	No	No	No	No	Yes	Hi-Five Ghost	Episode: "The Boredom"
2020–2022	Close Enough	Yes	Yes	Yes	Yes	Yes	Yes	Josh, himself	
2025	Big City Greens	No	No	No	No	No	Yes	Inconsiderate Man	Episode: "Scooped!"
2026–present	Regular Show: The Lost Tapes	Yes	No	Yes	Yes	No	Yes	Mordecai, Hi-Five Ghost, Additional Voices	
TBA	SuperMutant Magic Academy	Yes	—N/a	—N/a	—N/a	—N/a	—N/a		

== Awards and nominations ==
Year	Award	Category	Work	Result
2005	Nicktoons Film Festival	Producers Choice Award	The Naive Man from Lolliland	Won
2005	Nicktoons Film Festival	Student Animator Award	The Naive Man from Lolliland	Won
2010	Annie Award	Directing in a Television Production	The Marvelous Misadventures of Flapjack: Candy Casanova	Nominated
2011	Emmy Award	Outstanding Short-format Animated Program	Regular Show: Mordecai and the Rigbys	Nominated
2012	Emmy Award	Outstanding Short-format Animated Program	Regular Show: Eggscellent	Won
2013	Emmy Award	Outstanding Short-format Animated Program	Regular Show: A Bunch of Full Grown Geese	Nominated
2013	Emmy Award	Outstanding Animated Program	Regular Show: The Christmas Special	Nominated
2013	BMI Film & TV Awards	BMI Cable Award	Regular Show	Won
2014	Emmy Award	Outstanding Short-format Animated Program	Regular Show: The Last LaserDisc Player	Nominated
2014	BMI Film & TV Awards	Top Television Underscore	Regular Show	Won
2015	BMI Film & TV Awards	Top Television Underscore	Regular Show	Won
2016	Behind the Voice Actors Awards	Best Male Vocal Performance in a TV Special/Direct-to-DVD Title or Short	Mordecai in Regular Show: The Movie	Won
2016	Behind the Voice Actors Awards	Best Vocal Ensemble in a TV Special/Direct-to-DVD Title or Short	Regular Show: The Movie	Won
