= William Salyers =

American actor

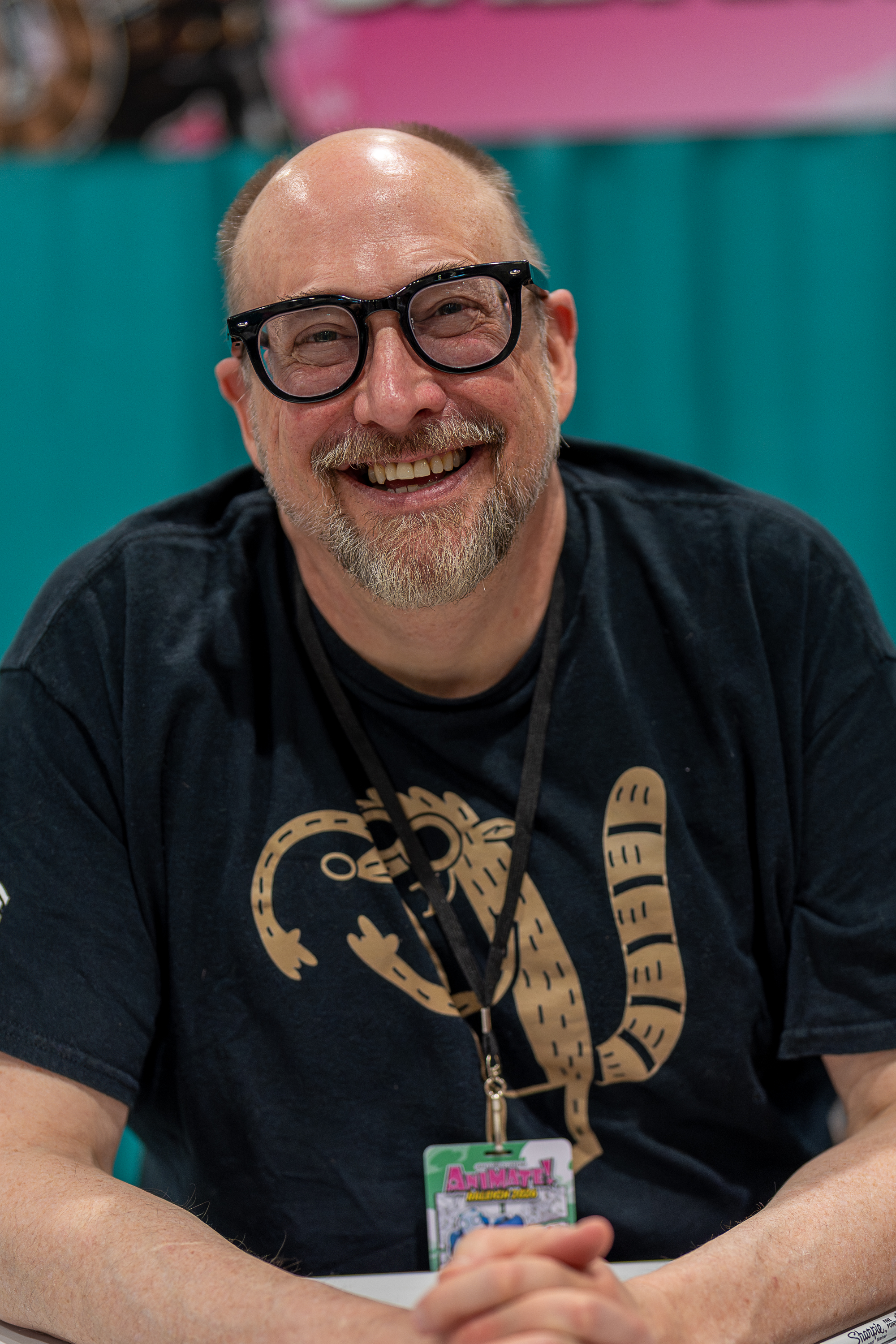
- Salyers at Animate! Raleigh in 2026
- Occupation: Actor
- Years active: 1993–present
- Spouses: Selah Brown (divorced) Nancy Elizabeth Dustin (m. 2007)
- Children: 1

William Salyers is an American actor, best known for his vocal performances, such as Reverend Putty and Mr. Littler on Moral Orel, Rigby on Regular Show, Toranosuke Yoshida in Persona 5, and Otto Octavius / Doctor Octopus in the 2018 video game Spider-Man.

== Biography ==
Salyers grew up in Pawhuska, Oklahoma and graduated from Pawhuska High School in 1982. He is known as the voice of Rigby, amongst other characters, on Regular Show, Reverend Putty and Mr. Littler on Moral Orel, and Otto Octavius / Doctor Octopus in the 2018 video game Spider-Man, its 2020 spin-off Spider-Man: Miles Morales, and the 2023 sequel Spider-Man 2, as well as Marvel Ultimate Alliance 3: The Black Order. Salyers also provided the voices of the Penguin in Batman: Return of the Caped Crusaders and Batman vs. Two-Face, Virman Vundabar in Justice League Action, Truman Marsh in Avengers Assemble, Sensei Wu, Master Chen, Gorzan, Mayor Hubert, and The Scarecrow in Lego Dimensions, and Bruce Banner in Marvel's Midnight Suns. He has also had live-action roles in the film Bedazzled and the television series Judging Amy.

== Filmography ==
=== Film ===
Year	Title	Role	Notes
1999	The Book of Stars	Hospital Doctor	
2000	Bedazzled	Devil (Elegant)	
2016	Batman: Return of the Caped Crusaders	Penguin (voice)	Direct-to-video
2017	Deep	Darcy (voice)	
2017	Batman vs. Two-Face	Penguin (voice)	Direct-to-video
2018	Batman: Gotham by Gaslight	Hugo Strange (voice)	Direct-to-video
2019	DC Showcase: Sgt. Rock	The Iron Major (voice)	Short film
2020	Superman: Red Son	Joseph Stalin (voice)	Direct-to-video
2022	Pompo: The Cinéphile	Additional Voices	English dub
2023	Batman: The Doom That Came to Gotham	Penguin, Professor Manfurd (voice)	Direct-to-video
2025	Dorothea	Willy Wilkes	

=== Television ===
Year	Title	Role	Notes
1993, 1995	Northern Exposure	Mitch, Shakespeare	2 episodes
1995	Medicine Ball	Scalpel Wielding Maniac	Episode: "Wizard of Bras"
1996	Pandora's Clock	Controller	Miniseries
2000, 2003	Judging Amy	Phil Dyer	2 episodes
2001	Strong Medicine	ER Doctor	Episode: "Maternity"
2001	The Huntress	Douglas Quinn	Episode: "Generations"
2005–08	Moral Orel	Reverend Putty, Mr. Littler (voices)	28 episodes
2009	iCarly	Judge Phillipe	Episode: "iCook"
2010–12	Mary Shelley's Frankenhole	The Invisible Man, John Hancock (voices)	3 episodes
2010–17	Regular Show	Rigby, additional voices	245 episodes
2015	Regular Show: The Movie	Rigby (voice)	Television film
2016–17	Avengers Assemble	Truman Marsh, World Security Council Member (voice)	6 episodes
2017	Ant-Man	Yellowjacket (voice)	2 episodes
2017	Justice League Action	Virman Vundabar (voice)	Episode: "Under a Red Sun"
2018	Persona 5: The Animation	Toranosuke Yoshida (voice)	English dub
2018	The Epic Tales of Captain Underpants	Additional Voices	3 episodes
2019	Who Killed Little Gregory?	Etienne Sesmat	5 episodes
2020	Curious George	Nature Host (voice)	Episode: "George in His Own Backyard"
2020–22	Close Enough	Dog Boy, Doctor, Additional Voices	5 episodes
2021	Shaman King	Hang Zang-Ching, Olona (voice)	English dub 6 episodes
2021	Teenage Euthanasia	Stephen Hawking, Security Guard, Extreme Voice	Episode: "First Date with the Second Coming"
2022	Spriggan	Major Fatman, Professor Mauser, Steve Foster (voice)	English dub
2024	Batman: Caped Crusader	Mayor Jessop, Emil Potter (voice)	2 episodes
2025	Magilumiere Magical Girls Inc.	Shibafuji (voice)	English dub
2026-present	Regular Show: The Lost Tapes	Rigby (voice)	

=== Video games ===
Year	Title	Role	Notes	Source
2008	Hellboy: The Science of Evil	Lock, Additional Voices		
2008	Tom Clancy's EndWar	Additional Voices		
2008	Call of Duty: World at War	German Soldier		
2009	Eat Lead: The Return of Matt Hazard	Russian Soldier, Bandit		
2009	Cartoon Network Universe: FusionFall	Rigby		
2009	The Sims 3	Voice 1		
2009	Where the Wild Things Are	Douglas		
2010	Mass Effect 2	Joram Talid, Marab, Sergeant Haron, Security Officer Zemkl		
2010	Medal of Honor	Bossman		
2011	Dead Space 2	Additional Voices		
2011	Dungeon Siege III	Lazer Bassili, Meister Fiddlewick, Additional Voices		
2011	Captain America: Super Soldier	Hydra Forces		
2011	The Elder Scrolls V: Skyrim	Additional Voices		
2012	The Darkness II	Victor Valente		
2012	Mass Effect 3	Mordin Solus		
2013	The Bureau: XCOM Declassified	Heinrich Dresner, Outsider Infiltrator		
2013	République	David Bowen		
2014	WildStar	Ish'amel the Bloodied, Zarkonis, CaravanMaster Braithwait, Mechari Male, Chua, Cosine		
2014	SimCity: BuildIt	Additional Voices		
2014	Sunset Overdrive	Additional Voices		
2014	Far Cry 4	Additional Voices		
2014	Lego Ninjago: Nindroids	Sensei Wu		
2014–16	Star Wars: The Old Republic	Ajolin, Lord Ivress, Jarak, Lord Anril		
2015	Evolve	Hank		
2015	Pillars of Eternity	Thaos ix Arkannon		
2015	Anki Overdrive	Dark		
2015	Lego Dimensions	Sensei Wu, Master Chen, Mayor Hubert, Gorzan, Scarecrow		
2015	Fallout 4	Bullet, Calvin Whitaker, Sheffield		
2016	Hitman	Erich Soders		
2016	Persona 5	Toranosuke Yoshida		
2016	XCOM 2	Julian		
2016	World of Final Fantasy	Cid		
2017	Agents of Mayhem	Claymore (Cormac Ross), Tres Delmore, Pride Trooper		
2018	Dynasty Warriors 9	Cao Ren, Huang Gai		
2018	Pillars of Eternity II: Deadfire	Thaos ix Arkannon, Weto, Injured Soldier		
2018	Spider-Man	Otto Octavius / Doctor Octopus		
2018	The Legend of Heroes: Trails of Cold Steel IV	Carl Regnitz		
2019	Rage 2	Atom Hammer		
2019	Marvel Ultimate Alliance 3: The Black Order	Doctor Octopus		
2019	Fallout 76	Calvin Van Lowe, Toxic Larry	Wild Appalachia DLC	
2019	Persona 5 Royal	Toranosuke Yoshida		
2020	Final Fantasy VII Remake	Palmer		
2020	The Legend of Heroes: Trails of Cold Steel IV	Governor Carl Regnitz		
2020	Yakuza: Like A Dragon	Nonomiya	English dub	
2020	Call of Duty: Black Ops Cold War	Perseus		
2020	Spider-Man: Miles Morales	Otto Octavius		
2021	Ratchet & Clank: Rift Apart	The Fixer, Robot Pirates, Additional Voices		
2021	Back 4 Blood	Hoffman		
2022	Saints Row	Law Enforcement, Santo Ileso Pedestrians		
2022	Marvel's Midnight Suns	Bruce Banner		
2023	Spider-Man 2	Otto Octavius		
2023	Persona 5 Tactica	Ichiro Nakabachi		
2024	Like a Dragon: Infinite Wealth	Yotaro Nakajima, additional voices		
2024	The Legend of Heroes: Trails into Reverie	Soldiers & Citizens of Zemuria		
2024	Final Fantasy VII Rebirth	Palmer		
2024	Batman: Arkham Shadow	Woody, Donnegan, CO Mitchell		
2025	Like a Dragon: Pirate Yakuza in Hawaii	Jack the Collector		
