= List of Cartoon Network Studios productions =

This article contains a list of productions made by the American animation studio Cartoon Network Studios. This list includes animated television series, shorts, pilots, specials, and other projects. Live-action projects produced by Alive and Kicking, Inc., Factual Productions and Rent Now Productions are included as they are the labels of Cartoon Network Studios' live-action division.

== Television series ==
=== Animated series ===
#	Title	Year(s)	Creator(s)/ Developer(s)	Co-production with	Network	Notes
1990s
1	Dexter's Laboratory	1996–2003	Genndy Tartakovsky		Cartoon Network	Seasons 1, 3–4 only. Spin-off of the What a Cartoon! shorts of the same name. Hanna-Barbera produced season 1 using "Cartoon Network Studios" as an in-name division label only.
2	Johnny Bravo	1997–2004	Van Partible		Cartoon Network	Seasons 3–4 only. Spin-off of the What a Cartoon! shorts of the same name.
3	The Powerpuff Girls	1998–2005	Craig McCracken		Cartoon Network; The WB	Seasons 4–6 only. Spin-off of the What a Cartoon! shorts of the same name.
2000s
4	Time Squad	2001–03	Dave Wasson		Cartoon Network	
5	Samurai Jack	2001–04	Genndy Tartakovsky		Cartoon Network; The WB	
5	Samurai Jack	2017	Genndy Tartakovsky	Williams Street	Adult Swim	
6	Grim & Evil	2001–02	Maxwell Atoms		Cartoon Network	Spin-off of the Cartoon Cartoon short "The Grim Adventures of Billy & Mandy: 'Meet the Reaper'", which was produced by Hanna-Barbera and won the first Big Pick Show marathon.
7	Whatever Happened to... Robot Jones?	2002–03	Greg Miller; Mike Stern		Cartoon Network	Spin-off of the Cartoon Cartoon short "Whatever Happened to Robot Jones?", which was produced by Hanna-Barbera and aired as part of the Big Pick Show marathon.
8	Codename: Kids Next Door	2002–08	Mr. Warburton	Curious Pictures	Cartoon Network; The WB	Spin-off of the Cartoon Cartoon short "Kids Next Door: No P in the OOL", which aired as part of the Big Pick Show marathon. The studio handled assistance for the recording studio and produced the crossover special "The Grim Adventures of the KND".
9	The Grim Adventures of Billy & Mandy	2003–08	Maxwell Atoms		Cartoon Network	Spin-off of Grim & Evil.
10	Evil Con Carne	2003–04	Maxwell Atoms		Cartoon Network	Spin-off of Grim & Evil.
11	Star Wars: Clone Wars	2003–05	Genndy Tartakovsky	Lucasfilm Ltd.	Cartoon Network	Rights now owned by Disney Platform Distribution.
12	Megas XLR	2004–05	Jody Schaeffer; George Krstic		Cartoon Network	Spin-off of the Cartoon Cartoon short "LowBrow: 'Test Drive'" which was aired as part of the Cartoon Cartoon Weekend Summerfest marathon.
13	Foster's Home for Imaginary Friends	2004–09	Craig McCracken; Lauren Faust; Mike Moon		Cartoon Network; The WB	
14	Hi Hi Puffy AmiYumi	2004–06	Sam Register; Shakeh Hagnazarian	Renegade Animation	Cartoon Network	Based on the pop/rock duo Puffy AmiYumi, known as the composers of Teen Titans' theme song.
15	The Life & Times of Juniper Lee	2005–07	Judd Winick		Cartoon Network	
16	Camp Lazlo	2005–08	Joe Murray	Joe Murray Productions	Cartoon Network	
17	My Gym Partner's a Monkey	2005–08	Julie McNally Cahill; Timothy Cahill		Cartoon Network	
18	Ben 10	2005–08	Man of Action		Cartoon Network	
19	Squirrel Boy	2006–07	Everett Peck		Cartoon Network	
20	Class of 3000	2006–08	André Benjamin; Thomas W. Lynch; Patric M. Verrone	Tom Lynch Company; Moxie Turtle	Cartoon Network	
21	Out of Jimmy's Head	2007–08	Tim McKeon; Adam Pava	Brookwell McNamara Entertainment	Cartoon Network	Sequel to Re-Animated.
22	Chowder	2007–10	C. H. Greenblatt		Cartoon Network	
23	Transformers: Animated	2007–09	Sam Register; Derrick J. Wyatt; Matt Youngberg; Marty Isenberg	Hasbro Entertainment; The Answer Studio	Cartoon Network	Rights now owned by Hasbro.
24	Ben 10: Alien Force	2008–10	Man of Action; Dwayne McDuffie; Glen Murakami		Cartoon Network	Sequel to Ben 10.
25	The Marvelous Misadventures of Flapjack	2008–10	Thurop Van Orman		Cartoon Network	
2010s
26	Adventure Time	2010–18	Pendleton Ward	Frederator Studios	Cartoon Network	Based on the short of the same name that was aired as part of Nicktoons' Random! Cartoons.
27	Ben 10: Ultimate Alien	2010–12	Man of Action; Dwayne McDuffie; Glen Murakami		Cartoon Network	Sequel to Ben 10: Alien Force.
28	Generator Rex	2010–13	Man of Action; Rob Hoegee		Cartoon Network	Based on the comic of the same name.
29	The Cartoonstitute	2010	Rob Sorcher		Cartoon Network Video	Only online series on the Cartoon Network Video app.
30	Regular Show	2010–17	J. G. Quintel		Cartoon Network	
31	Sym-Bionic Titan	2010–11	Genndy Tartakovsky; Bryan Andrews; Paul Rudish	Orphanage Animation Studios	Cartoon Network	
32	Robotomy	2010–11	Michael Buckley; Joe Deasy	World Leaders Entertainment	Cartoon Network	
33	The Problem Solverz	2011	Ben Jones	Mirari Films	Cartoon Network	Originally intended to air on Adult Swim as Neon Knome, it was later picked up by Cartoon Network as The Problem Solverz.
33	The Problem Solverz	2013	Ben Jones	Mirari Films	Netflix (Note: Season 2 of The Problem Solverz was produced for air on Cartoon Network, but the channel opted not to air it. Streaming rights were later leased to Netflix, who got to premiere season 2.)	Originally intended to air on Adult Swim as Neon Knome, it was later picked up by Cartoon Network as The Problem Solverz.
34	Secret Mountain Fort Awesome	2011–12	Peter Browngardt		Cartoon Network	Based on characters from the short Uncle Grandpa.
34	Secret Mountain Fort Awesome	2012	Peter Browngardt		iTunes (Note: The final eight episodes were produced for air on Cartoon Network, but the channel opted not to air them. The episodes eventually made their debut on the iTunes Store.)	Based on characters from the short Uncle Grandpa.
35	Ben 10: Omniverse	2012–14	Man of Action; Matt Youngberg; Derrick J. Wyatt		Cartoon Network	Sequel to Ben 10: Ultimate Alien.
36	Uncle Grandpa	2013–17	Peter Browngardt		Cartoon Network	Spin-off of Secret Mountain Fort Awesome.
37	Steven Universe	2013–19	Rebecca Sugar		Cartoon Network	
38	Mixels	2014–16	John Fang; David P. Smith	The Lego Group	Cartoon Network	
39	Clarence	2014–18	Skyler Page		Cartoon Network	
40	Over the Garden Wall	2014	Patrick McHale		Cartoon Network	Miniseries.
41	We Bare Bears	2015–19	Daniel Chong		Cartoon Network	Based on the comic of the same name.
42	Long Live the Royals	2015	Sean Szeles		Cartoon Network	Miniseries.
43	The Powerpuff Girls (2016)	2016–19	Nick Jennings; Bob Boyle		Cartoon Network	Reboot of the original 1998 animated series.
44	Mighty Magiswords	2016–19	Kyle A. Carrozza		Cartoon Network	First original series based on a web series.
45	Ben 10 (2016)	2016–21	Man of Action		Cartoon Network	Reboot of the original 2005 animated series.
46	OK K.O.! Let's Be Heroes	2017–19	Ian Jones-Quartey		Cartoon Network	Second original series based on a web series.
47	Apple & Onion	2018–21	George Gendi		Cartoon Network	
48	Craig of the Creek	2018–25	Matt Burnett; Ben Levin		Cartoon Network	
49	Summer Camp Island	2018–19	Julia Pott		Cartoon Network	
49	Summer Camp Island	2020–21	Julia Pott		HBO Max	
49	Summer Camp Island	2023	Julia Pott		Cartoon Network	
50	Victor and Valentino	2019–22	Diego Molano		Cartoon Network	
51	Mao Mao: Heroes of Pure Heart	2019–20	Parker Simmons	Titmouse, Inc.	Cartoon Network	
52	Infinity Train	2019–20	Owen Dennis		Cartoon Network	
52	Infinity Train	2020–21	Owen Dennis		HBO Max	
53	Steven Universe Future	2019–20	Rebecca Sugar		Cartoon Network	Sequel to Steven Universe.
2020s
54	Adventure Time: Distant Lands	2020–21	Adam Muto	Frederator Studios	HBO Max	Spin-off of Adventure Time.
55	Tig n' Seek	2020–22	Myke Chilian		HBO Max; Cartoon Network	
56	The Fungies!	2020–21	Stephen P. Neary		HBO Max; Cartoon Network	
57	We Baby Bears	2022–present	Manny Hernandez		Cartoon Network	Spin-off of We Bare Bears.
58	Unicorn: Warriors Eternal	2023	Genndy Tartakovsky		Adult Swim	Originally intended for Cartoon Network's ACME Night programming block. Reruns aired on ACME Night.
59	Invincible Fight Girl	2024	Juston Gordon-Montgomery		Adult Swim	Originally intended for Cartoon Network.
60	Cartoon Cartoons	2026	Various		YouTube	Second online series on YouTube.
61	Regular Show: The Lost Tapes	2026–present	J. G. Quintel		Cartoon Network	Revival of Regular Show.
62	Adventure Time: Side Quests	2026–present	Nate Cash	FredFilms	Hulu (U.S.); Cartoon Network (International only)	Reboot of Adventure Time.
Upcoming
63	Steven Universe: Lars of the Stars	TBA	Rebecca Sugar; Ian Jones-Quartey	Amazon MGM Studios	Amazon Prime Video	Sequel to Steven Universe.
64	Adventure Time: Bubblegum & Marceline	TBA	Adam Muto	FredFilms	HBO Max	Spin-off of Adventure Time.

=== Live-action series ===
#	Title	Year(s)	Creator(s)/ Developer(s)	Co-production with	Network	Notes
2010s
65	Tower Prep	2010	Paul Dini	Cartoon Network	Dolphin Entertainment	
66	Level Up	2012–13	Derek Guiley; David Schneiderman	Cartoon Network	D and D Productions	
67	Incredible Crew	2013	Nick Cannon	Cartoon Network	N'Credible Entertainment	Final live-action series to air on Cartoon Network.

=== Preschool series ===
#	Title	Year(s)	Creator(s)/ Developer(s)	Co-production with	Network	Notes
2020s
68	Jessica's Big Little World	2023–24	Matt Burnett; Ben Levin; Tiffany Ford		Cartoon Network; Cartoonito	First Cartoon Network Studios original preschool series. Spin-off of Craig of the Creek.
Upcoming
69	Adventure Time: Heyo BMO	TBA	Adam Muto; Ashlyn Anstee	FredFilms	Cartoon Network	Spin-off of Adventure Time.

=== Adult animated series ===
#	Title	Year(s)	Creator(s)/ Developer(s)	Co-production with	Network	Notes
2000s
70	Harvey Birdman, Attorney at Law	2002–03	Michael Ouweleen; Erik Richter	Allied Art & Science (season 1, episodes 2–4; season 2, episode 1)	Adult Swim	Season 1, episodes 3–9 only.
2010s
71	Black Dynamite	2014–15	Carl Jones	Ars Nova; N-BOMB SQUAD; Williams Street	Adult Swim	Season 2 only.
72	Primal	2019–present	Genndy Tartakovsky	Williams Street	Adult Swim	
2020s
73	JJ Villard's Fairy Tales	2020	J.J. Villard	Villard Film; Williams Street	Adult Swim	
74	Close Enough	2020–22	J. G. Quintel; Sean Szeles; Matt Price; Calvin Wong		HBO Max	Originally intended for TBS, it released on HBO Max instead; reruns later aired on TBS.
75	Adventure Time: Fionna and Cake	2023–present	Adam Muto	Frederator Studios (season 1); FredFilms (season 2)	HBO Max	Spin-off of Adventure Time.
Upcoming
76	Heist Brothers	TBA	Genndy Tartakovsky	Williams Street	Adult Swim	
77	Super Mutant Magic Academy	TBA	J. G. Quintel; Jillian Tamaki	Williams Street	Adult Swim	Based on the comic of the same name.
78	Conan the Barbarian	TBA	Genndy Tartakovsky	Amazon MGM Studios	Amazon Prime Video	

=== Adult live-action series ===
#	Title	Year(s)	Creator(s)/ Developer(s)	Co-production with	Network	Notes
2010s
79	Million Dollar Extreme Presents: World Peace^{[L]}	2016	Million Dollar Extreme	Million Dollar Extreme; Williams Street	Adult Swim	The studio was credited as Rent Now Productions.
80	Dream Corp LLC	2016–20	Daniel Stessen	Williams Street; Sunday Night Productions	Adult Swim	Seasons 2–3 only. The studio was credited as Alive and Kicking, Inc.
81	Joe Pera Talks with You	2018–21	Joe Pera	Chestnut Walnut Unlimited; Williams Street	Adult Swim	The studio was credited as Factual Productions for season 1 and Alive and Kicking, Inc. for seasons 2–3.
82	Mostly 4 Millennials	2018	Derrick Beckles	TV Carnage; Sick Duck Productions; Williams Street	Adult Swim	The studio was credited as Factual Productions.
83	Tropical Cop Tales^{[L]}	2018–19	Jim Hosking; Toby Harvard	Another HH Production; Williams Street	Adult Swim	The studio was credited as Alive and Kicking, Inc.
2020s
84	Three Busy Debras	2020–22	Sandy Honig; Alyssa Stonoh; Mitra Jouhari	Paper Kite Productions; Mail Lizard; Williams Street	Adult Swim	The studio was credited as Alive and Kicking, Inc.

=== Short series ===
Title	Year(s)	Creator(s) Developer(s)	Co-production with	Network	Notes
2000s
Foster's Home for Imaginary Friends shorts	2006–2007	Craig McCracken; Lauren Faust; Mike Moon		Cartoon Network	All released and aired as part of Cartoon Network's New Media Shorts.
My Gym Partner's a Monkey shorts	2006–2008	Julie McNally Cahill; Timothy Cahill		Cartoon Network	All released and aired as part of Cartoon Network's New Media Shorts.
Billy's Birthday Shorties	2006	Maxwell Atoms		Cartoon Network	All released and aired as part of Cartoon Network's New Media Shorts.
Camp Lazlo shorts	2006–2008	Joe Murray		Cartoon Network	All released and aired as part of Cartoon Network's New Media Shorts.
The Life & Times of Juniper Lee shorts	2006–2007	Judd Winick		Cartoon Network	All released and aired as part of Cartoon Network's New Media Shorts.
Irwin Hearts Mandy	2007	Maxwell Atoms		Cartoon Network	All released and aired as part of Cartoon Network's New Media Shorts.
The Marvelous Misadventures of Flapjack shorts	2007	Thurop Van Orman		Cartoon Network	Aired as part of Wedgies anthology series in 2008 as the only Cartoon Network Studios shorts featured in that project.
The Grim Adventures of Billy & Mandy shorts	2007	Maxwell Atoms		Cartoon Network	All released and aired as part of Cartoon Network's New Media Shorts.
Ben 10 shorts	2007–2012	Man of Action		Cartoon Network	All released and aired as part of Cartoon Network's New Media Shorts.
Squirrel Boy shorts	2008	Everett Peck		Cartoon Network	All released and aired as part of Cartoon Network's New Media Shorts.
2010s
Regular Show shorts	2011	J. G. Quintel		Direct-to-video	
Regular Show shorts	2015–17	J. G. Quintel		Cartoon Network	
Adventure Time shorts	2012	Pendleton Ward	Frederator Studios	Direct-to-video	
Adventure Time shorts	2015–2016	Pendleton Ward	Frederator Studios	CartoonNetwork.com	
Adventure Time shorts	2016	Pendleton Ward	Frederator Studios	Cartoon Network	
Mighty Magiswords shorts	2015–2017	Kyle A. Carrozza		Cartoon Network App	First Cartoon Network Studios/Cartoon Network original web series.
Clarence shorts	2015–2018	Skyler Page		Cartoon Network	
We Bare Bears shorts	2015–2017	Daniel Chong		Cartoon Network	
Uncle Grandpa shorts	2015–2017	Pete Browngardt		Cartoon Network	
Steven Universe shorts	2015–2021	Rebecca Sugar		Cartoon Network	
OK K.O.! Let's Be Heroes shorts	2016–2017	Ian Jones-Quartey		Cartoon Network App	Second Cartoon Network Studios/Cartoon Network original web series.
The Powerpuff Girls shorts	2016–2017	Nick Jennings; Bob Boyle		Cartoon Network	
Get 'Em Tommy!	2016	Victor Courtright		Cartoon Network App	Third Cartoon Network Studios/Cartoon Network original web series.
Ben 10 shorts	2017	Man of Action		Cartoon Network	
Ben 10 shorts	2017–2019	Man of Action		YouTube	
Apple & Onion shorts	2018	George Gendi		Cartoon Network	
DIY	2018	Isaiah Saxon; Sean Hellfritsch; Daren Rabinovitch	Encyclopedia Pictura	YouTube	
Infinity Train: The Train Documentaries	2019	Owen Dennis		CartoonNetwork.com; YouTube	
Craig of the Creek shorts	2019	Matt Burnett and Ben Levin		Cartoon Network	

== Pilots ==
=== Successful ===
Title	Year	Creator(s)	Co-production with	Notes
2000s
Evil Con Carne	2000	Maxwell Atoms		Aired as part of the series premiere of Grim & Evil. Pilot for the show of the same name.
Codename: Kids Next Door	2001	Mr. Warburton		Aired as part of Cartoon Network's The 2nd Big Pick Show marathon, later won the competition. Pilot for the show of the same name, which is entirely produced by Curious Pictures.
LowBrow	2002	Jody Schaeffer; George Krstic		Aired as part of Cartoon Network's Cartoon Cartoon Weekend Summerfest marathon. Pilot for Megas XLR.
My Gym Partner's a Monkey	2003	Julie McNally-Cahill; Timothy Cahill		Never released anywhere or aired on TV. Pilot for the show of the same name.
Camp Lazlo	2004	Joe Murray		Never released anywhere or aired on TV. Pilot for the show of the same name.
Squirrel Boy	2005	Everett Peck		It wasn't released online or aired on TV, but shown only at School of Visual Arts. Pilot for the show of the same name.
The Marvelous Misadventures of Flapjack	2007	Thurop Van Orman		Released online in mini sequence as part of the interview with its creator. Pilot for the show of the same name.
Uncle Grandpa	2008	Pete Browngardt		Released as part of The Cartoonstitute. The pilot was used as the basis for the series Secret Mountain Fort Awesome, and then greenlit as its own series.
Regular Show	2009	J. G. Quintel		Released as part of The Cartoonstitute. Pilot for the show of the same name.
2010s
Class Clowns^{[L]}	2011	Nick Cannon	N'Credible Entertainment	Only Cartoon Network Studios live-action short pilot to be greenlit as a TV series. Pilot for Incredible Crew.
Steven Universe	2013	Rebecca Sugar		First of the pilots from Cartoon Network's Shorts Development Program to be greenlit as a full series. Pilot for the show of the same name.
Clarence	2013	Skyler Page		Second of the pilots from Cartoon Network's Shorts Development Program to be greenlit as a full series. Pilot for the show of the same name.
Tome of the Unknown	2013	Patrick McHale		Third of the pilots from Cartoon Network's Shorts Development Program to be greenlit as a full series. Unlike the other pilots, that were shown online, this was selected for screening at LA Shorts Fest. Greenlit as Over the Garden Wall.
Lakewood Plaza Turbo	2013	Ian Jones-Quartey		Fourth of the pilots from Cartoon Network's Shorts Development Program to be greenlit as a full series. Greenlit as a mini web/full series titled OK K.O.! Let's Be Heroes.
Long Live the Royals	2014	Sean Szeles		Shown as an artwork at the Cartoon Network's Shorts Development Program. Pilot for the miniseries of the same name.
We Bare Bears	2014	Daniel Chong		Based on the webcomic The Three Bare Bears, it was shown at the European KLIK! Amsterdam Animation Festival. Pilot for the show of the same name.
Apple & Onion	2015	George Gendi		Screened at the Annecy Film Festival. Pilot for the show of the same name.
Summer Camp Island	2016	Julia Pott		Screened at the SXSW Festival. Pilot for the show of the same name.
Infinity Train	2016	Owen Dennis		Pilot for the show of the same name.
Victor and Valentino	2016	Diego Molano		Pilot for the show of the same name.
The Fancies	2017	Stephen P. Neary		Screened at the ABP Festival. Greenlit as The Fungies!. A little sign about its pick-up was a cameo in the OK K.O.! Let's Be Heroes' special Crossover Nexus.
Tiggle Winks	2017	Myke Chilian		Greenlit as Tig n' Seek. Like for The Fancies, a little sign about its pick-up was a cameo in the OK K.O.! Let's Be Heroes' special Crossover Nexus.
Craig of the Creek	2017	Matt Burnett; Ben Levin		Thirteenth of the pilots from Cartoon Network's Shorts Development Program to be greenlit as a full series. Pilot for the show of the same name.
The Invincible Fight Girl: Legend of the Swole	2021	Juston Gordon-Montgomery		Never released anywhere or aired on TV. Greenlit as Invincible Fight Girl.

=== Failed ===
Title	Year	Creator(s) Developer(s)	Co-production with	Notes
2000s
IMP, Inc.	2001	Chris Reccardi; Charlie Bean		All aired as part of Cartoon Network's The 2nd Big Pick Show marathon and defeated by Codename: Kids Next Door in voting.
My Freaky Family	2001	John McIntyre		All aired as part of Cartoon Network's The 2nd Big Pick Show marathon and defeated by Codename: Kids Next Door in voting.
Ferret and Parrot	2001	Scott Morse		All aired as part of Cartoon Network's The 2nd Big Pick Show marathon and defeated by Codename: Kids Next Door in voting.
A Kitty Bobo Show	2001	Kevin Kaliher; Meg Dunn		All aired as part of Cartoon Network's The 2nd Big Pick Show marathon and defeated by Codename: Kids Next Door in voting.
Commander Cork: Space Ranger	2002	Mike Bell		All aired as part of Cartoon Network's Cartoon Cartoon Weekend Summerfest marathon.
Jeffrey Cat: Claw and Order	2002	Mark O'Hare		All aired as part of Cartoon Network's Cartoon Cartoon Weekend Summerfest marathon.
Bagboy!	2002	John Mathot; Ken Segall		All aired as part of Cartoon Network's Cartoon Cartoon Weekend Summerfest marathon.
Welcome to Eltingville^{[A]}	2002	Evan Dorkin		First Cartoon Network Studios pilot made for and aired on Adult Swim.
The Groovenians^{[A]}	2002	Kenny Scharf		Premiered on Adult Swim but also ran on Cartoon Cartoon Fridays. Rejected due to extremely negative reviews from critics and audiences.
Party Wagon	2004	Craig Bartlett	Snee-Oosh, Inc.	
Periwinkle Around the World	2004	Aaron Springer		Refusing to pick it up as a full series, Cartoon Network instead was going to release five shorts from the pilot as mobile phone content, but ended up putting them in their Sunday Pants anthology series in 2005.
Korgoth of Barbaria^{[A]}	2006	Aaron Springer	Williams Street	Originally picked up by Adult Swim as a full series, it was later canceled due to high production costs.
Welcome to Wackamo	2006	John McIntyre		
What's Wrong with Ruth?	2006	William Reiss		
Bumble Braynes	2007	Matt Danner	6 Point Harness	
Diggs Tailwagger: Galactic Rover	2007	Derek Drymon		Originally pitched to Nickelodeon.
Enter Mode 5	2007	Gabe Swarr		
Locker 514^{[L]}	2007	Jeffrey Nodelman; Eric Trueheart		
Project Gilroy	2007	Shannon Tindle; Shane Prigmore; Andy Schuhler		
Siblings^{[L]}	2007	Thomas W. Lynch	Tom Lynch Company	
Stan the Man^{[L]}	2007	Matt Dearborn		
Zoot Rumpus	2007	Kaz		
Mask of Santo	2008	Carlo Olivares Paganoni and El Hijo del Santo	6 Point Harness	Based on the real-life Mexican wrestler icon El Santo, it was originally to be a series broadcast on the network, but the pilot ultimately wasn't picked up.
Underfist: Halloween Bash	2008	Maxwell Atoms		Spin-off pilot from The Grim Adventures of Billy & Mandy.
Pizzor The Destroyer	2009	Eric Trueheart		
Spang Ho!	2009	Lincoln Peirce	Global Media Productions	
2010s
KROG^{[L]}	2010	Mark Rivers		
Attention Students^{[L]}	2011	Garrett Frawley; Brian Turner	Attention Productions	
Aliens in the House^{[L]}	2011	Danny Kallis	Attention Productions	
Dynamice!	2011	Butch Hartman	Billionfold Inc.	
Harlem Man	2011	Robert Brewster		
The Pound Hole^{[L]}	2015	Daniel Weidenfeld Doug Lussenhop	Working for Monsters; Douggpound; Williams Street	As Rent Now Productions.
The Mark Lembeck Technique^{[L]}	2016	Adam Lustick	Scrubble; Williams Street	As Alive and Kicking, Inc.
Hunky Boys Go Ding-Dong^{[L]}	2018	Zack Carlson, Bryan Connolly and Todd Rohal	PFFR; Steak Beef Bee Jamesandwich Beef Version; Williams Street	As Factual Productions.
Ole Bud's ANU Football Weekly^{[L]}	2018	Chris "CP" Powell and Chip Hall	Dutch Treat Productions; Williams Street	As Alive and Kicking, Inc.
Bad Manners^{[L]}	2020	Todd Rohal	PFFR; TUbb; Williams Street	As Alive and Kicking, Inc.

== Other shorts ==
This is a list of Cartoon Network Studios/Cartoon Network original shorts that were not pilots.

Title	Creator(s)	Year	Notes
Angels with Dirty Faces	Sugababes; Cartoon Network Studios	2002	Only music video short produced by the company.
The Great Pinkerton	John McIntyre	2004	Featured as part of Sunday Pants anthology series in 2005.
Flower Pals	Cartoon Network Studios	2005	
Mr. Pike	Lillian Hughes	2012	First short winner of Young Writers Program, a special school project created in 2010 by the former Studios' executive Zita Lefebvre, in partnership with Burbank's R.L. Stevenson Elementary School. Its creator, Lillian Hughes, was a fifth grader student of the same school.
You Are Special	Sherryn Sim	2013	Second short winner of Young Writers Program. Used for the Cartoon Network's campaign "Stop Bullying: Speak Up", the creator Sherryn Sim was an eighth grader student of D.S. Jordan Middle School.
Revelation	Boys & Girls Club of Burbank	2014	Short created by nine middle/high school kids members of the club for Cartoon Network's campaign "Stop Bullying: Speak Up". These members are: Tamara Chehata, Jonathan Morgan, James Casey, ZanyQa Price, Stephanie Reyes, Karina Lopez, Rosio Iniguez, Aaliyah Arellano, and Angela Ayvazyan.
Pibby	Dodge Greenley	2021	Short concept trailer produced by the studio which was released on the Adult Swim YouTube channel. It received widespread popularity online and the concept would be expanded on in Adult Swim's April Fools broadcast in 2022.

== Feature films and specials ==
=== Television releases ===
Title	Year	Co-production with	Notes
2000s
The Flintstones: On the Rocks	2001		Dedicated to William Hanna and Hoyt Curtin.
The Powerpuff Girls: 'Twas the Fight Before Christmas^{[V]}	2003		
Billy & Mandy's Big Boogey Adventure	2007		
Billy & Mandy: Wrath of the Spider Queen	2007		
Ben 10: Secret of the Omnitrix	2007		
Ben 10: Race Against Time^{[L]}	2007	Trouper Productions	First live-action film produced by Cartoon Network Studios. Based on Ben 10.
The Powerpuff Girls Rule!!!	2008		
Foster's Movie: Destination: Imagination	2008		
Ben 10: Alien Swarm^{[L]}	2009	Trouper Productions	Live-action film based on Ben 10: Alien Force.
2010s
Firebreather	2010	Pistor Productions	First Cartoon Network Studios/Cartoon Network original CGI film. Based on the comic book published by Image Comics.
Ben 10/Generator Rex: Heroes United	2011		Featuring characters and elements from both Ben 10, respectively Ben 10: Ultimate Alien and Generator Rex.
Level Up^{[L]}	2011	D and D Productions	Pilot to the series of the same name.
The Powerpuff Girls: Dance Pantsed	2014		
Adventure Time: Stakes	2015	Frederator Studios	
Regular Show: The Movie	2015		Limited theatrical release in independent theaters between August and October 2015.
The Adult Swim Golf Classic: Daly vs. Scott^{[L]}	2016	J.O.N. Williams Street	As Alive and Kicking, Inc.
Joe Pera Helps You Find the Perfect Christmas Tree^{[L]}	2016	Chestnut Walnut Unlimited; Williams Street	As Rent Now Productions.
Mr. Neighbor's House^{[L]}	2016, 2018	El Zombie, Inc. Mantzoukas; Marimacha; The Corddry Company; Williams Street	As Alive and Kicking, Inc.; two specials have been produced.
Adventure Time: Islands^{[V]}	2017	Frederator Studios	
Adventure Time: Elements	2017	Frederator Studios	
Hunky Boys Go Ding-Dong^{[L]}	2018	PFFR; Steak Beef Bee Jamesandwich Beef Version; Williams Street	As Factual Productions.
Soft Focus with Jena Friedman^{[L]}	2018, 2019	CNT Productions; Williams Street	As Factual Productions; two specials have been produced.
Steven Universe: The Movie	2019		
2020s
We Bare Bears: The Movie^{[V]}	2020		
Ben 10 Versus the Universe: The Movie	2020		
Craig Before the Creek	2023		Prequel to Craig of the Creek.
The Adventure Time Movie	TBA	Frederator Films	

=== Theatrical releases ===
Title	Year	Co-production with	Notes			
Title	Year	Co-production with	Notes	The Powerpuff Girls Movie	2002	Based on The Powerpuff Girls. Distributed by Warner Bros. Pictures.

^{V} A direct-to-video production.
^{A} An adult animated production.
^{L} A live-action production.
