= AJ Goes to the Dog Park =

2024 comedy film

- Directed by: Toby Jones
- Written by: Toby Jones
- Produced by: Ben Hanson
- Starring: AJ Thompson
- Cinematography: Tucker Lewis
- Edited by: Toby Jones
- Music by: Secret Cities
- Production companies: Cartuna; Keybot
- Distributed by: Doppelganger Releasing
- Release date: 24 March 2024 (Fargo Film Festival)
- Running time: 79 minutes
- Country: United States
- Language: English

AJ Goes to the Dog Park is a 2024 surrealist comedy film edited, written and directed by Toby Jones in his live-action feature directorial debut. It is Jones' third production revolving around the character AJ (played by Jones' friend AJ Thompson) after the 2006 film AJ Goes to France and the 2014 animated Cartoon Network pilot AJ's Infinite Summer. In the film, AJ has to go through a set of trials and tribulations in order to become the new mayor of Fargo, North Dakota after the current one replaces his favorite dog park with a computer lab.

The film premiered at the Fargo Film Festival on March 23, 2024 before receiving a limited theatrical run on July 25, 2025. It received positive reviews from critics.

== Plot ==
AJ lives in Fargo, North Dakota in a house with his two best friends Danny and Morgan, and his two dogs Diddy and Biff, working an entry level middle-management position at a company owned by his father. One day on a trip to the dog park, AJ learns that the mayor has closed down the dog park to build a blog park, an outdoor computer lab. AJ goes to the mayor to demand the dog park be reinstated, to which the mayor tells AJ he'll never get it back. Soon, AJ's life falls apart and Danny and Morgan move stateside and he decides that he must fight, fish, scrap, scrape, and sap in order to become Fargo's new mayor so he can get his dog park back.

AJ first learns to fight from Luciano, who moved into his house after Danny and Morgan left, who teaches AJ the carmen elbow technique the mayor used to defeat him in a fight. Successful, the mayor begins to learn of AJ's conquest and sends out her two suit aides to monitor the situation. AJ meets the sea captain Seastab who he works with to catch the biggest and longest fish ever to beat the mayor's current record. There, he learns that Seastab once tried to pursuit this goal himself to the point of distancing and alienating himself from his family. Despite increased pressure, AJ is successful and catches a comically long fish. Confused on how to scrap and scrape, AJ winds up getting kidnapped by the mayor's suit aides who plot to shoot him, however AJ catches wind and the aides' love for each other results in them joining AJ's side and declare him via a marriage ceremony the best scrapper and scraper in all of Fargo, much to the mayor's dismay.

AJ and the mayor fight face to face at Sapfest, the final challenge AJ must endure to become the new mayor of Fargo, where he must collect the most tree sap. At first it seems as though the mayor will be victorious, until AJ remembers the carmen elbow technique and uses it against the tree, making it erupt with sap and electing him as the new mayor of Fargo. Once seated into his office, he gives the two suit aides a vacation and finally reopens the dog park. However, once he gets there he realizes that his dogs Diddy and Biff have gone missing. It soon turns out that AJ spent so long pursuing his goal of getting the dog park back that it is now the year 2039. Worried, he goes to his father who tells him to search his dogs up on social media. There, he learns that Diddy and Biff are currently attending Fargo State University, and heads to the college to reunite. However he learns through Danny and Morgan's son AJ Jr. that Diddy and Biff are heading to the airport to study abroad in Prague. AJ makes amends with the former mayor and the two head to the airport, only to wind up distracted and miss their shot at reuniting AJ with his dogs. AJ Jr. tells him that because he was so busy trying to get the dog park back, he completely missed out on everything that happened in their lives. He tells him however, that it isn't forever, and that the dogs will be back home for Christmas because "everyone comes home for Christmas."

AJ gets tired of being the mayor and offers the position back to the previous mayor, who turns it down in favor of working middle management, ultimately getting hired by AJ's dad. Together, the two decide to merge their dog park and blog park ideas an open the Blog Bark, a combination dog park and computer lab. Sure enough, Christmas arrives and Danny and Morgan return with Diddy and Biff, leaving everyone happy. However, cracks begin to form in the ground and the apocalypse begins to strike all around North Dakota, where the evil underworld demon lord Krogloch arises to build a Krogloch Park and destroy Fargo. Realizing this has been what his entire journey has been leading up to, AJ wields a power sword and prepares to take on Krogloch himself, with the film ending on the two about to duel.

== Cast ==
- AJ Thompson as AJ
- Crystal Cossette Knight as the Mayor, who later names herself Air as she never had a name before AJ asked
- Greg Carlson as AJ's Dad
- Morgan Hoyt Davy as Morgan
- Danny Davy as Danny
- Jason Ehlert as Luciano and Thomas
- Jacob Hartje as Captain Seastab
- Zachary Lutz as Suit Aide 1
- Whitney McClain as Suit Aide 2
- Ethan Saari as AJ Jr.
- Hattie Gompf as Coffee Kiosk Lady
- Sadie Gompf as Other Coffee Kiosk Lady

Tucker Lewis and Toby Jones play a pair of press people with old 1920s cameras that wear hats. Owen Dennis, creator of the Cartoon Network/HBO Max series Infinity Train (2019–2021) and an executive producer on the film, provides the voice of Demon Lord Krogloch. OK K.O.! Let's Be Heroes (2017–2019) creator Ian-Jones Quartey makes a voice-only cameo as SapperFlash45, a YouTuber who makes videos about collecting tree sap.

== Production ==
AJ Goes to the Dog Park began production in 2021, and marked the first fully live-action project of Toby Jones, already well-known as being a writer and storyboard artist for the Cartoon Network series Regular Show (2010–2017) and OK K.O.! Let's Be Heroes (2017–2019). The film wrapped production in the summer of 2023. Steven Universe (2013–2019) creator Rebecca Sugar wrote and performed the original song "My Hill to Die On" for the film.

== Release ==
AJ Goes to the Dog Park had its world premiere at the Fargo Film Festival on March 23, 2024. The distribution rights were acquired by Doppelganger Releasing, who gave it a limited theatrical run on July 25, 2025 and a digital video on-demand release on August 26, 2025. Vinegar Syndrome released the film on DVD and Blu-ray on November 25, 2025. The film is also available on the streaming service Tubi.

== Reception ==
The film had a mostly positive critical reception. On review aggregator site Rotten Tomatoes, it holds an 80% approval rating based on reviews from 20 critics. The critics consensus reads, "A joyously zany, pun-filled indie comedy buoyed by AJ Thompson's endearing turn, AJ Goes to the Dog Park charms with nonstop gags and quirky heart." Richard Whitaker of The Austin Chronicle described the film as "two creative friends getting together and having fun exploring a comedic person," calling it both "mundane and surreal" simultaneously. Writing for MovieWeb, Mark Keizer was also positive, appreciating the film's surreal and zany nature, but was critical of its ending, saying that it'd risk alienating audiences, likening the film to Hundreds of Beavers (2022). Matt Zoller Seitz in his review for RogerEbert.com was very critical of the film, describing it as a mere "collection of gags" that was "not even half-baked", comparing it to a cheap imitation of Three Stooges and W.C. Fields-style comedy rather than a tribute.
