= AJ's Infinite Summer =

2014 film

- The words "AJ's Infinite Summer" over a sky background with clouds.
- Written by: Toby Jones

Production
- Producer: Nate Funaro
- Editor: Bobby Gibis
- Running time: 8.5 minutes
- Production company: Cartoon Network Studios

Original release
- Network: Cartoon Network
- Release: May 16, 2014

AJ's Infinite Summer is an animated television pilot created by Toby Jones for Cartoon Network. The pilot follows AJ, whose new job during the summer drives him crazy with power. It is loosely based on Jones' 2006 film, AJ Goes to France. Both the film and the pilot star AJ Thompson as the eponymous character. Jones additionally sought inspiration from his hometown of Fargo, North Dakota, and the comics he drew featuring Thompson and his other friends. The pilot was released on the official website of Cartoon Network on May 16, 2014.

== Plot ==
Summer vacation starts for AJ and his friends Danny and Morgan, who live in the city of Downer. When AJ wants to be spontaneous for his plans to spend the vacation, he impulsively decides to get a job. The trio comes across a corporate office. AJ wants to apply for the corporation that owns it, but Danny and Morgan suggest that he prepares for the interview. AJ turns to his father, Peter, for advice. He equips AJ with an oversized business suit, and afterward the trio enter the office to help AJ apply. AJ shows his resume, and immediately he is hired by the Instructor of First Impressions. Workers of the office welcome AJ, who wears the same style of business suit as they do. When he sees that each worker has their own assistant, AJ hires Morgan as his "secretary" and tells her to fetch papers. Meanwhile, he asks "towel boy" Danny to wipe the sweat off his brow.

After this demonstration of power, AJ is promoted by his manager. A montage of AJ being promoted for doing absurd tasks follows. Soon, AJ is promoted to a rank with a private office. Danny and Morgan refuse to work for AJ further, finding him corrupt with power. AJ throws them out, and afterward he is promoted to CEO by a former officer—a decrepit man within a robotic business suit. AJ floats to the top of the suit, from which he spots a beach ball-destroying machine to the side. He hallucinates the beach balls as the heads of Morgan and Danny, who say that he has destroyed the spirit of summer. Realizing his mistake, AJ rejects the promotion. He returns to his friends outside, and together they plan the rest of their summer.

== Production ==
AJ's Infinite Summer was created by Toby Jones. Produced by Nate Funaro at Cartoon Network Studios, the pilot had Robert Alvarez as timing director, Sue Mondt as art director, and Phil Rynda as creative director. AJ Thompson provided the voice for the eponymous character, Wallace Langham for Danny, Mae Whitman for Morgan, Chris Parnell for Peter, and David Hill for various characters.

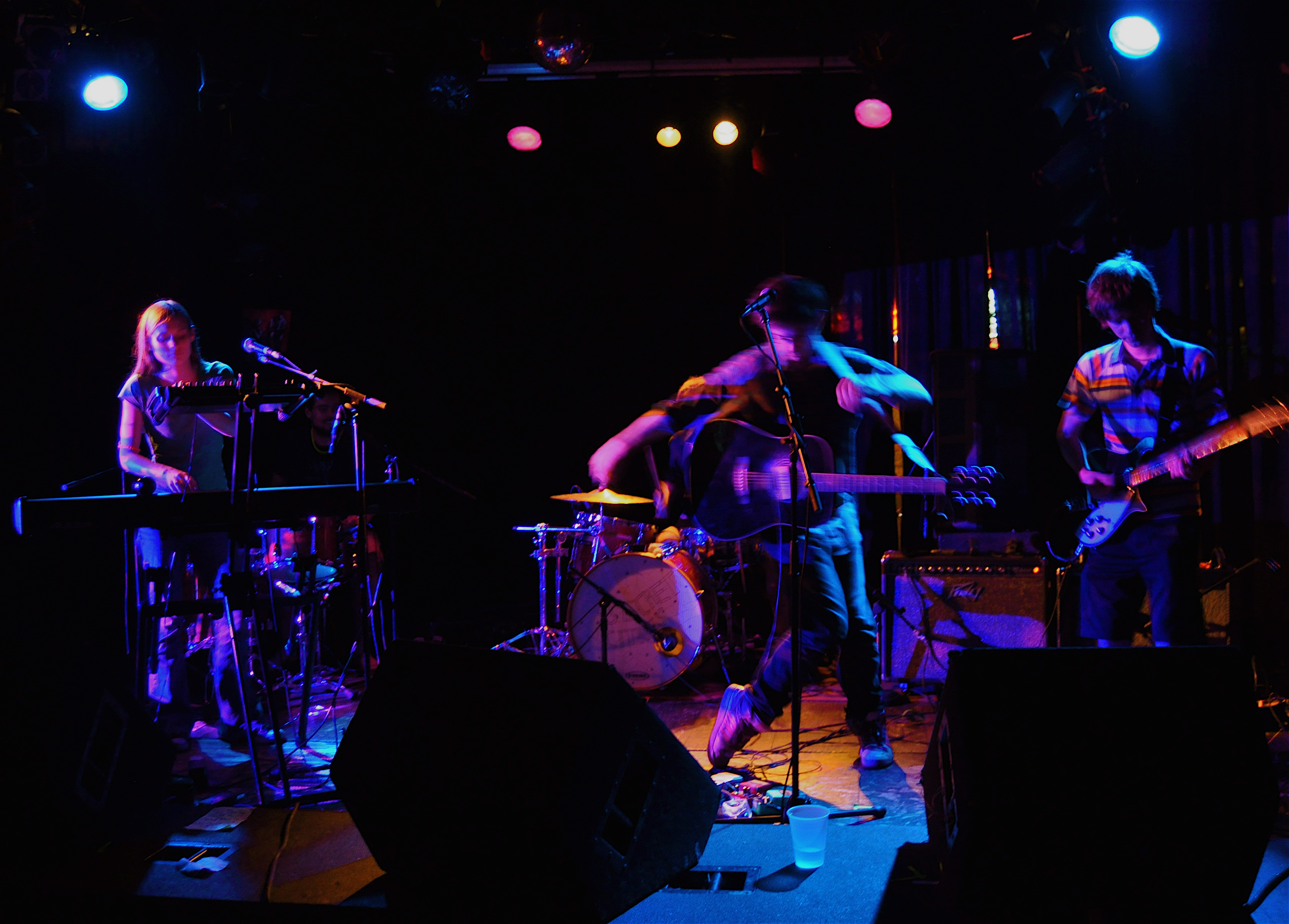
Secret Cities provided the score of the pilot. Members of the band are friends of Jones from his hometown of Fargo.

Jones had previously codirected AJ Goes to France, a 2006 live-action independent film that also has Thompson as the leading actor. It was produced as an assignment for Concordia College in Moorhead, Minnesota, where Jones majored in film. Jones had moved from his hometown of Fargo, North Dakota, to Minneapolis in 2005, after he graduated from Fargo South High School. For AJ's Infinite Summer, Jones was inspired by his hometown, as well as the comics he drew that featured AJ and his other friends, Danny Davy and Morgan. Additionally, the character of Peter is based on Greg Carlson, Jones' professor from Concordia and also a film director and a critic for the High Plains Reader. Secret Cities, a Fargo-based band in which Jones' friends play, provided the score for the pilot. Jones found it excellent that both his friends and his friend's band were allowed by the network to do work for the pilot.

Jones moved to Los Angeles in 2011 to work for Cartoon Network. He has written and storyboarded for Regular Show, another production on the network. His work on it gave Jones the foresight to pitch another show he knew the network would want. Initially unsure if he was ready to pitch AJ's Infinite Summer, the network rejected the pilot the first time he did but approved it on the second, after he had reworked it throughout a few months. Jones contrasted the physical limitations of animating in time and energy to the animation of the pilot itself. He cited having the character of AJ run up a wall in one scene as an example of this.

== Release and reception ==
AJ's Infinite Summer was released without announcement on May 16, 2014, on the official website of Cartoon Network. Long Live the Royals, another pilot, was released on the same day. This pilot was created by Sean Szeles, who has also worked on Regular Show. Jason Krell of io9 found that the plot for AJ's Infinite Summer was simple yet flexible. He described its take on life during summer vacation as "charming" and comparable with an "aged-up Phineas and Ferb". He said that he was amazed by both and that his viewership will be granted for both, should they be picked up as full series. John Lamb of The Forum of Fargo-Moorhead recognized features of Fargo in the pilot, namely the high school, which he found analogous to Fargo South where Jones attended. Meanwhile, Amid Amidi of Cartoon Brew expected that the pilot would not have continuity from AJ Goes to France.

After the pilot was released, Jones found that people back in Fargo were amused to spot the differences in landmarks between their city and Downer. Jones told Lamb that since he worked in animation, he has been "surrounded by these people that I've looked up to for years as a fan, and having them tell me they enjoyed it is the greatest thing ever". As of June 2014, Jones is still mainly working on Regular Show but said that he would like it very much to have the network commission it as a series. He expressed interest in submitting it at the Fargo Film Festival. The pilot was listed in the ballot for "Outstanding Short-Format Animated Program" at the 66th Primetime Emmy Awards, although it did not win. The Long Live the Royals pilot did win in this category, however, and the network later commissioned it as a miniseries of the same name. The character of AJ was revisted by Jones in 2024 in the film AJ Goes To The Dog Park.
