= Among Us (TV series) =

American TV series

- Genre: Black comedy; Science fiction; Crime comedy; Murder mystery; Splatter; Satire
- Created by: Owen Dennis
- Based on: Among Us by Innersloth
- Directed by: Owen Dennis; Madeline Queripel
- Voices of: Yvette Nicole Brown; Kimiko Glenn; Liv Hewson; Ashley Johnson; Wayne Knight; Phil LaMarr; Randall Park; Dan Stevens; Debra Wilson; Elijah Wood; Patton Oswalt
- Theme music composer: Chrome Canyon; Owen Dennis
- Composer: Chrome Canyon
- Country of origin: United States
- Original language: English
- No. of seasons: 1
- No. of episodes: 10

Production
- Executive producers: Owen Dennis; Forest Willard; Marcus Bromander; Carl Neisser; Chris Prynoski; Shannon Prynoski; Antonio Canobbio; Ben Kalina
- Running time: 12–15 minutes
- Production companies: Keybot; Titmouse, Inc.; Innersloth; CBS Eye Animation Productions; CBS Studios

Original release
- Network: Paramount+
- Release: June 5, 2026

Among Us is an American adult animated science fiction black comedy television series created by Owen Dennis and produced by CBS Studios and Titmouse, Inc. It is based on the 2018 eponymous video game by Innersloth. The voice cast features Randall Park, Ashley Johnson, Elijah Wood, Liv Hewson, Phil LaMarr, Debra Wilson, Kimiko Glenn, Yvette Nicole Brown, Wayne Knight, Dan Stevens, and Patton Oswalt. It follows a crew aboard a spaceship who must deduce which of them is a murderous, shapeshifting alien Impostor.

Among Us was first announced in June 2023, and production had fully wrapped by October 2024. The series was released on Paramount+ on June 5, 2026, before an official announcement at the Summer Game Fest 2026 later that day.

== Premise ==
Among Us follows a premise similar to that of the video game Among Us. A crew team aboard the Skeld spaceship discovers there is an alien shapeshifter who plans to cause chaos, sabotage the ship, and kill each member. Thus, the crew must deduce which of them is the Impostor.

== Voice cast and characters ==
The cast from left to right: Blue, Lime, Black, Orange, Cyan, Red, Purple, White, Brown, Green, and Yellow

- Yvette Nicole Brown as Orange, the head of human resources. They represent MIRA and enforce guidelines and regulations across the Skeld. Although they act nice, they can be shady and value regular business quotas rather than the well-being of the crew. They also have a lot of trust balls.
- Kimiko Glenn as Cyan, the sweet hippie gemologist. They are Black's research partner due to the paperwork citing them as a geologist. They believe in crystal healing, astral signs, and tarot cards.
- Liv Hewson as Black, the goth geologist. They are Cyan’s research partner, much to their annoyance. They are cynical and have lost passion towards their job. However, they hate everyone and state so in episode 6.
- Ashley Johnson as Purple, the no-nonsense chief of security. They hold hostility towards Red due to their past, and have a pet "fishmate" called Heracles.
- Wayne Knight as Lime, the old paranoid engineer. They believe in conspiracy theories, goblins, and aliens, leading the others to believe they are insane. They have squish-bone syndrome, allowing them to crawl through the vents.
- Phil LaMarr as Brown, one of the cooks. They are best friends with Yellow, and are the calmer one of the duo.
- Randall Park as Red, the arrogant yet incompetent captain. They heavily rely on the MIRA handbook and their identity as a captain. They also have a past with Purple.
- Dan Stevens as Blue, the doctor. They used to focus on poetry before studying medicine and they take their job very seriously. They also are known for charming all the other crewmates.
- Debra Wilson as Yellow, one of the cooks. They are best friends with Brown, and are the more fiery one of the duo.
  - Wilson also voiced the PA system of the Skeld.
- Elijah Wood as Green, the new unpaid intern. They used to work at a worm farm, but hope to one day pilot their own ship.
- Patton Oswalt as White, a rich contest winner. They are a board member at their parents' pharmaceutical company, and are known to be friends with everyone they meet.

== Episodes ==
No.	Title	Animation directed by	Written by	Storyboarded by
1	"A Pizza Party Where Nothing Bad Happens"	Kim Tae Joon	Owen Dennis	Ryan Pequin & Cole Sanchez
New crewmates, unpaid intern Green and rich contest winner White, are given a tour of the Skeld by MIRA Corporation's human resources representative Orange, who introduces the other crewmates: geologist Black, gemologist Cyan, engineer Lime, security lead Purple, doctor Blue, chefs Yellow and Brown, and captain Red. The ship is transporting a new source of fuel called "Ore Plus" to MIRA's headquarters on the planet Industria. Purple informs Red that the cameras are unable to record and don't show color. Red allows White to try flying the ship. While White is at the controls, an asteroid strikes the hull, tearing a hole in the storage bay and unknowingly releasing alien parasites that assimilate two crewmates. The crew uses Orange's trust balls to patch the hole in the ship. Afterwards, the crew hold a pizza party to celebrate the successful repair. During the pizza party, White stumbles their way into the cafeteria and suddenly explodes in half, causing the crew to panic.
2	"You Can't Be Hot and Smart"	Kim Tae Joon	Alex Horab	Tracy Liang & Dashawn Mahone
Blue takes White's body to MedBay, where, despite Red's claims that it was a work-related accident, Blue sees a pink goo-like substance, and requests that everyone does a body scan. Lime refuses to be scanned, and Purple believes White's death was not accidental. Blue gets body scans of all the crewmates, including the reluctant Lime, and discovers a few scans that are different than the rest. Purple complains to Red about the faulty equipment preventing them from intervening, and leaves to do something. As Blue reviews the scans, they are killed by a tentacled alien in MedBay.
3	"Chaos Has Found a New Home!"	Kim Tae Joon	Justin Michael	Dave Alegre & Kellye Perdue
Purple slips on a puddle of blood leaking from MedBay, but the door is locked. Red orders Lime to enter MedBay through the vents. Lime finds Blue's face ripped off, as well as the unlabeled body scans, with one missing and another showing a crew mate without the single bone crewmates normally have. Red calls an emergency meeting to address the recent findings, but withholds the specifics of Blue's death and claims it is a workplace accident. Lime claims an alien impostor with no bones is responsible for Blue and White's deaths, and leaves to create a "holy" squirt gun to fight the alien. As the rest of the crew begin to suspect Lime is the killer, Red reads in their captain's handbook that aliens are real and that they like to kill.
4	"And They Like to Kill!"	Kim Tae Joon	Kiran Deol	Ryan Pequin & Cole Sanchez
All of the crew mates intend to go looking for Lime, but the ship's reactor begins to act up. Red goes with Green to temporarily fix it while Orange makes Black and Cyan do a check on the Ore Plus for any cracks. Black lashes out at Cyan for not being a proper geologist, and they leave. Purple, not trusting Red, looks through the security cameras and sees someone entering the kitchen, with Yellow and Brown not noticing. Purple enters, but finds a crying Cyan. The two bond, and Purple reveals they have been secretly keeping a pet mate, a fish named Heracles, in the Oxygen Room. As Yellow and Brown join them, Green comes running, having seen Lime emerge from the vents in the Reactor Room. As they all run to the door, they see Orange transform into an alien to impale and explode Lime.
5	"Good Vibes Only"	Kim Tae Joon	Ayla Glass	Tracy Liang & Dashawn Mahone
Orange acts like everything is normal, but Red lures Orange to the Cafeteria's garbage chute. Despite Orange claiming everyone has to vote for crewmates to be ejected, everyone agrees to eject Orange. Orange's body explodes once exposed to the vacuum of space, splattering more pink goo. Believing the danger has passed, the survivors hold a party. Everyone begins hallucinating and exhibiting strange behaviors, with Cyan encouraging Purple to introduce everyone to Heracles. While Purple goes to check up on them, they find Heracles dead and the oxygen levels low, the cause of their hallucinations. Purple discovers they need two people in order to fix the oxygen, so they try to go back to the cafeteria, but suddenly, the lights go out.
6	"Insecurity in Security"	Kim Tae Joon	Karen Han & Brian David Gilbert	Dave Alegre & Kellye Perdue
Purple uses the emergency oxygen tank to restore the crew's lucidity. Purple finds that two codes need to be inputed to fix the Oxygen, and once again accuses Red of poor leadership. Red orders Yellow, Cyan and Black to go to electrical to fix the lights, and tells Green, Purple and Brown to wait while they input the other code. Cyan gets upset when Black still treats them lesser for being a gemologist and enters electrical alone, with Yellow following. Back in the Oxygen room, Purple reveals they and Red were once interns together, but MIRA's understaffed operations led to a reactor meltdown and the planet being rendered inhospitable. While Red signed an NDA and got promoted, Purple refused, got blacklisted, and only went into security because Red got them the job. The lights are restored, and Purple discovers someone cut the wire that would have triggered the low oxygen alert. Yellow returns and declares a second impostor has killed Cyan.
7	"6 Angry Crewmates"	Kim Tae Joon	Kiran Deol	Dave Alegre & Kellye Perdue
Red calls an emergency meeting. Red and Black believe Yellow is the killer, as they discovered the body and were alone with Cyan, while Yellow accuses Black since they have a motive. Black claims this is impossible since they weren't with Cyan, but theorize that since the scans indicate the culprit has no bones, they could use the vents like Lime. Black tries to enter a vent to prove their innocence, and notices it covered in pink goo, confirming their theory. Purple accuses Red, who refuses to use the vent, and Purple shakes them down, revealing Red's captain handbook. Purple gets upset that all of Red's decisions have been based on the book, including hiding aliens' existence. Red orders everyone to empty their belongings, finding the missing boneless body scan in Yellow's backpack. Yellow claims innocence, but Red holds a vote. Red, Black, and Green accuse Yellow, while Purple and Yellow accuse Red, and Brown abstains. Yellow is ejected on the 3–2 vote and, showing middle fingers the whole time, freezes to death instead of exploding.
8	"Impostor Syndrome"	Hwang Jung Il	Alex Horab	Tracy Liang & Ryan Pequin
Red and Purple argue over sacrificing the innocent Yellow. Grieving their best friend's death, Brown makes a pizza using the salt that Yellow always recommended them. As Brown enjoys it, they are confronted by the impostor, accepting their fate. Everyone smells the burnt pizza, and finds Brown split in half vertically. Red sends everyone to do their tasks, and Black, feeling remorseful for how they treated Cyan, find's Cyan's notebook/dream journal. They read it, learning that Cyan had discovered that some the Ore Plus is hollow. Red tries to talk to Purple, but they refuse, continuing to blame Red and their refusal to hold MIRA culpable for the crew's deaths. Black is able to piece together that the ore are alien eggs. The reactor begins to malfunction again, approaching critical levels.
9	"I'm Just Venting"	Kim Tae Joon	Justin Michael	Ryan Pequin & Cole Sanchez
Black celebrates their discovery, only to hear the alien approaching. They flee, but find a crewmate who reveals themself as an impostor, which then chases them to the cafeteria and kills them. Everyone hears the scream, and Green, Red, and Purple approach the cafeteria to find Black's splattered remains. As they clean the body together they find Cyan's notes, with Black's handwriting claiming Cyan was right. The reactor alarm begins warning of a catastrophic meltdown, and the three survivors rush to the reactor chamber and prevent it. Purple compares the incident to the one when they and Red were interns, but Green doesn't remember Purple telling them the story. Suspicious, Purple accuses Green of being the impostor, while Green retaliates that it is Purple, who has never witnessed a single murder on the cameras and was always away from their post, claiming Red did the right thing in Purple's story. Red knows that anyone who heard Purple's story would agree Red was in the wrong, and agrees that Green is the impostor. Red tries to knock them out, but Green's suit deflates, revealing the alien escaped through the vents.
10	"Everyone Is Still Alive. No One Is Dead."	Hwang Jung Il	Karen Han & Brian David Gilbert	Tracy Liang & Dashawn Mahone
With Red and Purple as the last two crewmates, they retrieve Lime's weapon, but find has no effect on leftover alien goo. Finding Yellow's salt, they realize the aliens are weak to it and load it into the weapon. Purple agrees to be bait and confronts Green, who transforms into a monstrous alien form and admits they killed everyone but Lime, criticizing Orange for killing in plain sight. Green reanimates the dead crewmates' corpses with alien eggs, telling Purple that they never hatched the eggs until now to avoid competition. Red rescues Purple, and the two destroy the reanimated corpses and Green with salt water. During the fight, they learn that MIRA knew of the ore's true nature and were willing to sacrifice the crew. Upset, Red kicks their handbook through the trust ball blockade, reopening the hole and releasing the eggs into space. While Purple does not fully forgive Red for the past, they agree it is a start, and the two tell stories to pass the remaining voyage while the eggs slowly explode in space.

== Production ==
The show was announced in June 2023, with CBS Eye Animation Productions and Titmouse, Inc. producing. Owen Dennis, creator of the series Infinity Train, was also confirmed to be involved as director. The series' first teaser was revealed at Summer Game Fest in 2024 following the announcement of Innersloth. That October, Dennis stated that the series was "all finished and wrapped in a bow".

In March 2024, it was announced that Randall Park, Ashley Johnson, Yvette Nicole Brown, Elijah Wood, Dan Stevens, Liv Hewson and Kimiko Glenn would provide their voices for the series. In April, Patton Oswalt, Debra Wilson, Phil LaMarr and Wayne Knight joined the cast.

== Release ==
Among Us was initially slated for release on Paramount+. However, Dennis stated in 2024 that the series did not yet have a distributor. Few updates on the series were given afterwards, leading to Among Us game developer Innersloth clarifying on their 2026 roadmap that the series was "not dead". The show was quietly released on Paramount+ on June 5, 2026, hours before its intended announcement during Summer Game Fest; the first episode was also made available for free on YouTube.

== Reception ==
Among Us has received mostly positive critical reviews, with praise given to the voice acting, humor, and animation, although some have criticized its pacing. Charles Harte of Game Informer states, "the show is fun, not obsessed with game references, and makes a far more earnest attempt at depicting drama and death than I could have guessed. Put simply, Among Us works." Belen Edwards of Mashable simply calls the series "a bizarre, welcome surprise". Isaiah Colbert of Gizmodo calls it "a delightful mix of comedy and horror".

Aimee Hart of Polygon gave a more negative review, praising the animation but criticizing the show for being uninteresting and a bad adaptation of the game. David Opie of GamesRadar+ felt that the series was not as "addictive" as the original game.
