= List of Infinity Train episodes =

Infinity Train is an American animated anthology television series created by Owen Dennis, formerly a writer and storyboard artist on Regular Show, for Cartoon Network and HBO Max. As of 2022, four seasons totalling forty episodes have aired, plus an additional series of ten short webisodes.

== Series overview ==
Book	Name	Episodes	Originally released		
Book	Name	Episodes	First released	Last released	Network
Pilot			November 2, 2016 (Note: This is the date the pilot launched on YouTube; the first television broadcast of the pilot was on February 11, 2017.)		YouTube
1	The Perennial Child	10	August 5, 2019	August 9, 2019	Cartoon Network
2	Cracked Reflection	10	January 6, 2020	January 10, 2020	Cartoon Network
3	Cult of the Conductor	10	August 13, 2020	August 27, 2020	HBO Max
4	Duet	10	April 15, 2021		HBO Max

== Episodes ==
=== Pilot (2016) ===
Title	Directed by	Written and storyboarded by	Original release date	Original release date	Prod. code	US viewers (millions)
"Infinity Train"	Nick Cross (art), and Randy Myers (animation)	Owen Dennis	November 1, 2016 (VOD); November 2, 2016 (Online)	February 11, 2017	00	0.70
A young girl named Tulip who resides in an infinity train (a train full of endless, different dimensions) ends up in a world full of Corgis called Corginia; there the Corgis are stalked by an evil creature named the Steward, and Atticus: King of the Corgis, believes Tulip can defeat it. Note: This episode would later be remade as "The Corgi Car."

=== Book One: The Perennial Child (2019) ===
No. overall	No. in season	Title	Written by	Storyboarded by	Original release date	Prod. code	US viewers (millions)
1	1	"The Grid Car"	Lindsay Katai, Madeline Queripel, Owen Dennis, and Cole Sanchez	Madeline Queripel, Sofia Alexander, Cole Sanchez, and Owen Dennis	August 5, 2019 (Note: This episode was first shown during the Infinity Train panel at San Diego Comic-Con on July 20, 2019. It was then released on the Cartoon Network app and website later that same day.)	V101	0.46
12-year-old Tulip Olsen aspires to be a video game designer and has a strained relationship with her divorced parents. She plans to go to game design camp in Oshkosh, but due to a scheduling mix-up, her parents are unable to take her there. Upset, Tulip runs away from home and encounters a train that sucks her in. She wakes up on a snowy field full of snowmen and meets a small robot named One-One. She discovers she is on the train and that this is just one of its cars. Tulip and One-One enter the next car, which consists of a grid that creates numerous cubes. Tulip discovers the number 115 on her hand. After witnessing someone getting taken out of another of the train's cars into a tube of light from the sky, Tulip tries to escape the train; on the ground outside the train she encounters canine-roach-like monsters (Ghoms) that attack her. She and One-One escape them and resolve to find the train's conductor.
2	2	"The Beach Car"	Alex Horab	Kellye Perdue and Sam Spina	August 5, 2019	V102	0.47
Tulip and One-One continue to hop from car to car. Tulip notices that the number on her hand has gone down to 114. One-One informs her that when it gets to 0 she will be "gone forever". In a car containing a beach, they encounter a cat conversing with a water blob named Randall (Rhys Darby). When the Cat mentions that she knows the conductor, Tulip asks her for help. The Cat reveals that One-One does not know anything about the number on her hand and that she will take him in exchange for getting a message to the conductor. Tulip helps the Cat fix her personal shuttle and the Cat leaves with One-One. Tulip suddenly feels remorse for letting One-One go and recruits Randall to help get him back. After an intense chase on top of the train, Tulip rescues One-One and the Cat vows revenge and escapes. Tulip apologizes to One-One, who forgives her.
3	3	"The Corgi Car"	Owen Dennis and Justin Michael	Sarah Soh, Jessie Wong, and Owen Dennis	August 6, 2019	V103	0.53
After a week, Tulip's number is now stuck on 109. She and One-One rush through numerous cars before ending up in Corginia, the kingdom of the corgis. Atticus, the king of Corginia, shows them around. A large tentacled shadow appears on the horizon and the nearby lake floods the land. Atticus tells Tulip and One-One the shadow is a monster that has been terrorizing Corginia and causing the flooding for some time and they need to stop it. Together the group travel across the landscape in the car until they find that the "monster" is just a spider being lit up by a small glowing ball; Tulip's number does not change. However, they encounter the Steward, a tentacled robot that is affecting the landscape, and thereby causing the flooding, by accessing panels in the train and removing glowing balls from them. The Steward attacks the group, but flees upon seeing One-One. Atticus decides to join the group as Tulip's number finally goes down to 101.
4	4	"The Crystal Car"	Lindsay Katai	Sofia Alexander and Ryan Pequin	August 6, 2019	V104	0.50
Tulip, Atticus, and One-One enter a crystal forest car and find the exit door high up on the side of a mountain. A crystal man appears and non-verbally communicates with them, revealing that in order to get to the door, they apparently need to sing an emotional song to a stone so that a staircase will appear. Atticus and One-One attempt to activate it, but their ways of singing are not effective. Tulip sings several emotional songs, but none of them work. Tulip builds a ladder to the door out of crystals, only to find it locked. Tulip finally realizes she needs to sing something with personal meaning to her, and sings "Word Up!" by Cameo, which she remembers from a car trip with her family. A crystal giant appears and unlocks the door. Tulip sees the number on her hand going down to 89.
5	5	"The Cat's Car"	Justin Michael	Kellye Perdue and Sam Spina	August 7, 2019	V105	0.48
The gang witnesses the cars switching and find themselves in the Cat's car. The Cat claims that she wants to help them now. As Tulip and her friends are about to leave, rejecting her offer, the Cat reveals that she has a video tape with Tulip's name on it. Despite some reluctance from Atticus, Tulip watches the tape and finds herself transported into her memories. She witnesses numerous happy moments before static begins to envelop her. She realizes that she is mis-remembering them and upon seeing them for what they are, both the happy and the sad, the static disappears. Tulip relives her parents' divorce and awakens back in the car. She angrily deduces that the Cat was trying to trap her; she chooses to ignore the number on her hand by wearing a glove. After they leave, the Cat is confronted by the Steward and the Conductor, who attack her for letting them go, but give her another chance.
6	6	"The Unfinished Car"	Alex Horab	Sofia Alexander, Ryan Pequin, and Madeline Queripel	August 7, 2019	V106	0.47
The gang enter the next car, which contains turtle people led by King Aloysius III (Matthew Rhys), who live in a city of logic-defying houses without walls, blackcurrant jam in the roads and numerous other physical oddities. One-One insists that the car is unfinished and they must do something about it. As Atticus and Aloysius converse, Tulip and One-One get to work trying to repair the car; but the residents are unhappy with the sudden changes. One-One begins dismantling the car by removing orbs from their panels, causing everything to float. Tulip rushes to One-One and explains that this was not his fault and that he does not need to take responsibility. One-One resets everything as Atticus and Aloysius agree on an alliance between their kingdoms. As the gang leaves, One-One glitches and loses his memories of the event.
7	7	"The Chrome Car"	Lindsay Katai	Jessie Wong and Jacob Winkler	August 8, 2019	V107	0.54
The gang enters the Chrome Car, where every surface is reflective. When Tulip discovers the exit is locked, she notices her reflection ("Mirror Tulip") is acting independently. Mirror Tulip tells her they need to switch places in order to unlock the door. They do so, but rather than helping, Mirror Tulip wants to escape and control her own life. One-One's reflection contacts the reflection police (Ben Mendelsohn and Bradley Whitford), who want to capture Mirror Tulip and grind her into dust for trying to escape. Evading them, Tulip and Mirror Tulip discover that Mirror Tulip cannot leave the Chrome Car because there are no reflective surfaces outside. After convincing Mirror Tulip to switch back with her, Tulip uses the mirror on her pocket knife to rescue her and allow her to escape. In the next car, Mirror Tulip chooses to leave the group and discover herself. She convinces Tulip to remove her glove, and as she does so, she sees the number goes down to 3.
8	8	"The Ball Pit Car"	Alex Horab	Kellye Perdue and Sam Spina	August 8, 2019	V108	0.50
The gang find themselves in the Ball Pit Car, where they try to relax and have fun. They meet a stuffed rabbit named Khaki Bottoms (Ron Funches) who they help in navigating the jungle gym. They see the Steward is outside and attempt to escape its tentacles, but get caught. The robotic-looking Conductor approaches Tulip and tells her she was supposed to stay put. The Cat appears, having upheld her end of a supposed bargain to be freed, but the Conductor tells her to chase One-One while the Steward fires on them. Atticus attacks the Conductor, who shoots him with a ray gun. The Conductor and Steward flee while blocking the exit as Atticus transforms into a ghom and attacks Tulip. One-One arrives to help Tulip as she manages to trap Atticus in a broken chute from the ball pit. As she catches her breath, she begins to break down in tears. One-One consoles her as she mourns the loss of her friend.
9	9	"The Past Car"	Justin Michael	Ryan Pequin and Sofia Alexander	August 9, 2019	V109	0.44
Tulip continues to sulk over Atticus and determines she cannot continue, and her number goes back up to 67. The Cat returns to tell Tulip that they can still save Atticus and presents her with another memory tape. Tulip, the Cat, and One-One venture into its contents and explore the memory of two students named Alrick and Amelia. They grew up and married, but tragedy struck when Alrick died. Amelia fled and discovered the train. The Cat helps Tulip figure out that the Conductor is Amelia, who has overthrown the real conductor, and that the cannons on the train can be used to help Atticus. Tulip's number reaches 0, and a portal opens by which she can escape the train and go home. She decides to help Atticus first, and is able to connect the Ball Pit Car to the Cat's personal shuttle, allowing the cat to bring Tulip, her friends and the portal to the engine at the front of the train.
10	10	"The Engine"	Lindsay Katai	Jessie Wong and Jacob Winkler	August 9, 2019	V110	0.48
The Cat brings the car with Tulip's group to the front of the train and then leaves. Tulip and One-One drag the container with Atticus to the Engine and confront Amelia, encased in her giant robot body. It is revealed that she had been trying to create a car that had Alrick in it. A fight ensues as Tulip takes one of the cannons and unleashes Atticus on the Steward while One-One runs to the front of the Engine. Avoiding Amelia, Tulip finds an orb designed to create a corgi, places it in the cannon, and successfully fires it at Atticus, changing him back. Meanwhile, One-One takes his place at the front as the real Conductor, and he and Atticus destroy the Steward. Tulip speaks with the elderly Amelia, whose number is so long it runs from her hand all the way up her arm and across her body, and persuades her to try to move on from Alrick's death. One-One creates a new exit for Tulip, and she bids goodbye to her friends. Seven months later, Tulip heads to camp, having made peace with her parents' divorce.

=== The Train Documentaries (2019) ===
From October 18 to November 15, 2019, a series of ten shorts titled "The Train Documentaries" was uploaded onto the Cartoon Network app and YouTube channel. Each short focuses on One-One showcasing a different car on the train.

No.	Title	Written by	Storyboarded by	Original release date
1	"The Green Car"	Justin Michael	Jessie Wong	October 18, 2019 (Cartoon Network Site) October 19, 2019 (YouTube)
One-One introduces his new documentary series about the infinity train and shows off the Green Car where everything is colored green. He is in for a surprise when he discovers Ben Green, a walking talking purple grape person before noticing an ominously shaped hole in a wall that resembles a stag.
2	"Tiny Wizard Car"	Lindsay Katai	Sam Spina	October 18, 2019 (Cartoon Network Site) October 19, 2019 (YouTube)
One-One shows off a car that resembles a cave that is full of tiny wizards who only mutter the word "spells!" over and over again as a form of communication. He witnesses a dramatic break up and reunion of two tiny wizards who suddenly send the rest into a laser frenzy against a rat.
3	"The Kaiju Car"	Justin Michael	Kellye Perdue	October 25, 2019 (Cartoon Network Site) October 26, 2019 (YouTube)
One-One enters the Kaiju Car, mislabeled the "Earthquake Car", as he fails to notice monsters destroying everything. A local citizen, a living building with arms and legs, warns him to flee, but he notices a pretzel-shaped cloud instead and dubs the car the "Pretzel Cloud Car".
4	"The Tech Support Car"	Alex Horab	Ryan Pequin	October 25, 2019 (Cartoon Network Site) October 26, 2019 (YouTube)
One-One returns to the Beach Car, renamed The Beach Side Car, to visit the rest of the living water inhabitants, who are all revealed to be Randalls. As he checks on a shopping stand for the donut holer, Randall provides tech support for a donut holer customer, only to learn that the person is using it on a tire.
5	"The Snow Car"	Alex Horab	Jacob Winkler	November 1, 2019 (Cartoon Network Site) November 2, 2019 (YouTube)
One-One revisits the Snow Car where he is under the belief that snow is made of salt. As he views his surroundings, he comes across three familiar looking snowmen along with a sign reading "One-One's Secret Stash" along with collected garbage. One-One suddenly remembers that he was trapped there for 33 years.
6	"The Hill Car"	Lindsay Katai	Sofia Alexander	November 1, 2019 (Cartoon Network Site) November 2, 2019 (YouTube)
One-One finds himself in a car composed of endless rolling hills, with one of them later revealed to be sentient. He receives the ire of an eagle that proceeds to attack and drag him across the landscape. Eventually, he comes across the car's exit door which appears to have been smashed in, worrying him.
7	"The Movie Theater Car"	Lindsay Katai	Jacob Winkler	November 8, 2019 (Cartoon Network Site) November 9, 2019 (YouTube)
One-One enters a Movie Theater Car that features anthropomorphic movie theater concessions. After confusing Tulip's journey for that of a movie, he begins to pick up on the concessions' song mentioning that he will be "his" snack. The concession stand turns out to be a living creature that tries to devour him as he flees.
8	"The Cross-Eyed Ducks Car"	Justin Michael	Ryan Pequin	November 8, 2019 (Cartoon Network Site) November 9, 2019 (YouTube)
The Cross-Eyed Ducks Car is exactly what is described: nothing but cross-eyed ducks covering every inch of the car. One-One attempts to show off the beautiful monuments, that are all covered with ducks, while a cross-eyed duck continues to make really bad eye-related puns.
9	"The Minecart Car"	Alex Horab	Jessie Wong	November 15, 2019 (Cartoon Network Site) November 16, 2019 (YouTube)
One-One shows off a car that resembles a giant cavern with a minecart as the only transportation. Equipped with personal belongings such as candy and memorabilia related to Tulip, One-One ventures through the caves and encounters a Lava Mole and, very briefly, the stag shaped hole.
10	"The Wedding Cake Car"	Alex Horab	Kellye Perdue	November 15, 2019 (Cartoon Network Site) November 16, 2019 (YouTube)
One-One presents the Wedding Cake Car which appears to be a world composed of said cake. They mess around with a wedding figurine before hearing voices of what sounds like children. One-One leans over the edge of the cake to see what appear to be figures running around underneath.

=== Book Two: Cracked Reflection (2020) ===
No. overall	No. in season	Title	Written by	Storyboarded by	Original release date	Prod. code	US viewers (millions)
11	1	"The Black Market Car"	Justin Michael	Kellye Perdue and Sam Spina	January 6, 2020 (Note: This episode aired as a "sneak peek" on January 1, 2020.)	V201	0.34
Some time after leaving Tulip, Mirror Tulip (or MT for short) disguises herself by shaving off all of her hair and changing into a rebellious look to hide from the Reflection Police ("Flecs") as she explores the train. When she visits a Black Market Car full of strange alien creatures, one of the creatures examines her with a glass eye; the Flecs jump through the reflection and chase her through the streets. She manages to evade them by escaping into the next car, which resembles an autumn forest, and hides behind a deer who changes color to camouflage her. After the Flecs leave the car, MT tries to leave the deer behind, but he will not leave her alone, and they spend the day together. The next morning, MT is angered when she sees the deer interacting with a boy named Jesse. Jesse names the deer Alan Dracula and he and MT discover more of the deer's strange powers. As MT furiously tells Jesse to leave him alone, Alan falls through the ground.
12	2	"The Family Tree Car"	Lindsay Katai	Jessie Wong and Jacob Winkler	January 6, 2020	V202	0.37
MT and Jesse climb down through the hole Alan fell through and discover that they are atop a giant tree. The tree is the "family tree" of the feuding Gillicuty and the Trumbleshanks families, occupied by talking wooden portraits of the family members. The families despise one another, but are forced to share the tree because of a marriage between younger members of the two families. MT wants to climb down the tree to look for Alan while Jesse wants to make peace between the families, creating conflict between Jesse and MT. They realize that the more they argue, the more the tree grows around them and turns Jesse into wood. When they begin to compliment one another and cooperate, the tree leaves them alone, and they reach the bottom. They find Alan starting to climb back up the tree himself, and MT and Jesse ride him back to the top. With no other option, MT decides to bring Jesse with her and help get his number down from 32.
13	3	"The Map Car"	Alex Horab	Sofia Alexander and Ryan Pequin	January 7, 2020	V203	0.43
MT and Jesse enter a car resembling a map, where they are greeted by Marcel (Wayne Knight), a drawing personifying the wind. He has them put together a paper map so the car's world can expand. MT halfheartedly helps Jesse by having him discover something emotional about himself, but his number goes up to 33. Eventually, talking about his school swim team, Jesse discusses how he always allows his teammates to overrule his own desires; his number goes down to 31. They realize Marcel is trying to keep them in the car, and Jesse discovers he can alter the map on his own: though the map is permanently missing a piece, Jesse draws an exit on a piece of paper and puts it in the empty space, resulting in the world becoming full-color and Marcel dissipating. Jesse's number goes down to 29 as he, MT, and Alan relax. However, the water is now reflective, and the Reflection Police emerge from it to capture MT.
14	4	"The Toad Car"	Justin Michael	Kellye Perdue and Sam Spina	January 7, 2020	V204	0.40
MT and Jesse escape into the next car: a blank white room with a talking toad that must be kicked in order for the exit to open. Jesse learns from the Reflection Police outside that MT is a fugitive, which causes conflict between the two. They find that Jesse cannot kick the toad without his number going up, forcing the group to stay inside the car overnight. Jesse watches a video on his phone of an incident in which he allowed bullies to mistreat his younger brother Nate, which he now regrets. Flec Agent Sieve tries to talk Jesse into letting them in through the reflective screen of his phone, but MT destroys the phone and tells Jesse her story. When Flec Agent Mace brings a power tool to the door to try to break into the room, the Toad allows himself to be kicked (by Alan) and the group escape, with Jesse grabbing the Toad and trapping the agents in the car. The Toad thanks them and leaves; Jesse and MT celebrate as Jesse's number goes down to 14.
15	5	"The Parasite Car"	Justin Michael	Jessie Wong and Jacob Winkler	January 8, 2020	V205	0.43
As MT and Jesse learn more about one another, they travel through a Flower Car. As they find the car's exit is blocked, Alan suddenly begins speaking. They discover that a parasite named Perry (Bill Corbett) has hopped into his mouth and is now controlling the deer, but he claims he is not harming Alan and helps them to exit the car. They go through a Fashion Car where they must show off on the runway to get to the exit. They succeed, but Alan's powers begin going haywire. The group enter a Food Pyramid Car where MT and Jesse notice Alan has gotten bigger, and they realize Perry is hurting Alan and Alan is trying to fight him off. MT retrieves a flower from the flower car (which Alan was allergic to), and Jesse gets Alan to sneeze Perry out. Jesse's number goes down to 11 as he, MT, and Alan continue their journey and leave Perry behind, desperate and frozen by Alan's powers.
16	6	"The Lucky Cat Car"	Lindsay Katai	Ryan Pequin and Madeline Queripel	January 8, 2020	V206	0.41
The group find themselves in a car containing the Lucky Cat carnival, where visitors play games to win prizes. The Cat, who runs the carnival, tells them that the exit door is a prize they must win, and that only one person can win it each month. However, if they get a combined score of 1000 points, she will allow both MT and Jesse to leave. They play against a mysterious masked gamer, and find that Jesse scores more points than MT for the same accomplishments, since as a passenger he ostensibly has a greater need to get off the train. Jesse tells MT that he does not want to leave without her, and his number goes down to 4. They are distracted by Alan's fascination with a claw crane game, and lose to the mysterious gamer, a passenger named Grace. She opens the exit door to allow in a gang of kids who ransack the carnival, and invites Jesse to hang out with her in the next car. As they leave Grace takes off her glove, revealing her extremely large number going up to her forearm.
17	7	"The Mall Car"	Alex Horab	Kellye Perdue and Sam Spina	January 9, 2020	V207	0.49
Grace introduces Jesse and MT to her gang, the Apex: children who want to keep their numbers high in order to stay on the train, and consider Amelia the rightful Conductor and One-One a usurper. Their headquarters is the ransacked Mall Car. Grace takes Jesse under her wing and they visit the next car; Apex members take Alan to be "stabled", and MT stays in the Mall Car to look for him. Grace tells Jesse that they consider MT a "null": not a real person, because she doesn't have a number. They convince him to act destructively, which causes his number to slowly rise. MT rescues Alan from the rest of Apex, who decide to throw them off the train. Jesse arrives in time to rescue her, but Grace unleashes the Flecs on them. Jesse's number goes down to 0 and the portal back home opens. However, MT cannot enter it and Jesse is forcibly sucked back home, leaving MT distraught and cornered.
18	8	"The Wasteland"	Lindsay Katai	Ryan Pequin, Annisa Adjani, Madeline Queripel, and Sarah Soh	January 9, 2020	V208	0.46
MT and Alan flee from the Flecs, with MT using a stolen backpack- like device that the Apex uses called the harpoon pack. They manage to hop to the top of the train, and MT knocks Sieve off the train with her harpoon pack, but Agent Mace shackles himself to MT. A car shifts itself and slices Mace in half, but knocks him, MT, and Alan into the wasteland surrounding the train. Enraged, MT tells Mace that he chose to be a flec when his prime died and puts him on Alan to escape. Though MT tries to walk away from the train with Mace and Alan, they are unable to travel beyond a limited distance from it. Still living, Mace begins to mock MT as they are chased by the Ghoms. He tells MT she was never meant to have a life of her own; denizens of the train have the sole purpose of helping passengers like Tulip and Jesse. MT decides to take one of the passenger pods up to the front of the train so that she can demand a number of her own. She manages to use the harpoon pack to escape the Ghoms and get herself and Alan back to the train, and crushes Mace under the train wheels. MT and Alan wait on top of the train car for a passenger pod to show up.
19	9	"The Tape Car"	Justin Michael	Jessie Wong and Jacob Winkler	January 10, 2020	V209	0.41
MT and Alan hijack a pod from an elderly passenger and ride it back to its origin. A video on the pod plays, in which One-One explains that the damaged pod needs to be fixed at the Tape Car. Upon entering it, MT discovers that passengers, having been made unconscious after being brought on the train, are placed in a gelatinous substance where they are monitored and have their memories copied onto videotapes that rate their flaws and issues. They are then dropped down to a room where a laser uses the information from the tape to inscribe a number onto their hand. MT puts her hand in the path of the laser in order to receive a number, but the beam just goes through her body. Angry and frustrated, she begins to destroy the room's service robots and prepares to do the same to the laser, only to be stopped by One-One, piloting the Steward robot.
20	10	"The Number Car"	Alex Horab	Kellye Perdue and Sam Spina	January 10, 2020	V210	0.38
MT demands a number from One-One, but they tell her that she is only meant to help passengers, and not actually leave herself. They then discover that Jesse is now back on the train. Examining his memories, they find that he returned home and reconciled with Nate, but was brought back onto the train by his desire to rescue MT. MT wakes Jesse up and One-One puts a new number onto his hand, but it instead becomes ever-changing mathematical symbols. Jesse's need to rescue MT is incompatible with the Train's normal operating procedure, which forbids denizens of the cars from leaving, causing One-One to get stuck in a logical loop. Sieve appears, intent on getting his revenge on MT. She realizes that her metallic skin can reflect Jesse's number onto her own hand; this creates a loophole that allows both to leave the train. Alan blows up Sieve when he tries to stop them. Back home, Jesse introduces MT to Nate; after looking at her new surroundings, MT decides to name herself Lake.

=== Book Three: Cult of the Conductor (2020) ===
No. overall	No. in season	Title	Written by	Storyboarded by	Original release date	Prod. code
21	1	"The Musical Car"	Justin Michael	Kellye Perdue and Ryann Shannon	August 13, 2020 (Note: This episode aired as a "sneak peek" on the HBO Max website on August 12, 2020.)	301
The Apex continue to assault the various cars. Grace and Simon, the Apex leaders, train the younger members to raid and pillage the cars for their gifts while continuing to harm and kill the "nulls"; the denizens of the train. The Apex move on to their next raid in the Unfinished Car. As Grace and Simon fight off the inhabitants, the cars suddenly begin to shift. Grace and Simon order the kids to head back to the Mall Car, but Simon gets pinned by debris and Grace heads back to rescue him; separating them from the group. They escape the car through the other exit. Far from their base, they believe that One-One is finally on to them and decide to head back; entering the next car: The Jungle Car.
22	2	"The Jungle Car"	Alex Horab	Jessie Wong and Angela Kim	August 13, 2020	302
Grace and Simon journey into the Jungle Car. While Simon attempts to keep a disciplined mind to survive their new surroundings, Grace convinces him to relax and take a break from leading the Apex. They suddenly realize that they are not alone as something big is knocking down the trees. The two are taken (and subsequently tickled) by a giant purple gorilla creature with horns on her shoulders named Tuba who is caring for a small girl named Hazel. Grace and Simon attempt to recruit Hazel whose number, which reads 337, is not glowing. The two are convinced that One-One shut off her number so that they could not find her. Hazel, who does not seem to realize that she is a child, takes a liking to the two and agrees to go with them on the condition that Tuba come along. Despite reluctance from Simon, Grace agrees, telling Simon privately that they will eventually ditch Tuba.
23	3	"The Debutante Ball Car"	Lindsay Katai	Kellye Perdue and Ryann Shannon	August 13, 2020	303
As the group traverse the next car, Grace and Simon convince Hazel that One-One took over the train from the previous conductor who supposedly wanted them to have fun in it, apparently unaware of Amelia's actual goal. They enter the Debutante Ball Car which has octopus aristocrats and a living chandelier (Alfred Molina). Due to Hazel's wanting to be inducted into the Apex, Grace and Simon decide to play by the car's rules and learn the dance to escape. As Simon tries to look for an alternative exit, Grace asks Hazel about her parents, which distresses her. Grace shares with Hazel about taking dance classes and how she was alienated by her peers. When Simon is unable to find an exit, they learn the dance and successfully leave the car. As Tuba and Grace share a glance, Grace's number unknowingly goes down.
24	4	"Le Chat Chalet Car"	Alex Horab	Diana Huh and Jacob Winkler	August 13, 2020	304
The group enter a car with a snowy tundra and stop for a snowball fight, during which Grace notices her shrinking number. A snowstorm hits and the group find a cabin to stay in, encountering the Cat. Simon is furious and wants to leave, but unable to due to the blizzard. Grace and Hazel have fun collecting things to eat for the time being while Simon walks through the cabin and becomes even more disturbed. He finally tells a confused Hazel not to talk to the Cat because she had abandoned him when he was ten, something the Cat solemnly does not deny. He further gets mad at Grace for being ignorant. In turn, Grace reveals her shrinking number and apologizes to him. They discover Randall is the cause of the blizzard and get him to stop. As the group leaves, Simon and the Cat share a solemn "au revoir".
25	5	"The Color Clock Car"	Justin Michael	Angela Kim and Jessie Wong	August 13, 2020	305
The group enter the Color Clock Car, a white room with abstract shapes and a giant five colored clock in the center. The denizen, Roy, tells them that they need to solve the puzzle as a group and find the key to the door. Hazel asks Grace to have Simon and Tuba work together so that they can be friends. Each time the clock changes color, the shapes change, giving them different obstacles. Tuba and Simon seemingly bond with Tuba telling him about her daughter. The lock to the door is red while they find a green key. Simon realizes that Tuba is colorblind and uses it to unlock the door. Just then, the cars shift and Simon willingly and coldheartedly lets Tuba fall into the wheels of the train. Grace attempts to console a distraught Hazel; however, Hazel flees the car and, to Grace’s horror, begins to transform into a turtle-like creature.
26	6	"The Campfire Car"	Lindsay Katai	Kellye Perdue, Jessie Wong, and Ryann Shannon	August 20, 2020	306
Hazel, frightened by her own transformation, eventually calms down and returns to normal as Grace calms her down. Both agree to keep the transformation a secret. In the adjacent Campfire Car, Grace admonishes Simon for killing Tuba. Hazel wants to hold a funeral for Tuba and seeks a suitable place for a glowing stone that belonged to Tuba. A frustrated Simon waits by the exit while Hazel chooses a tree nook to place the stone. As Grace says some words in memory of Tuba, she cries. Instead of the Apex Car in the subsequent car, the group come upon a giant canyon. Amelia appears and demands what they have done to the train.
27	7	"The Canyon of the Golden Winged Snakes Car"	Lindsay Katai	Diana Huh and Jacob Winkler	August 20, 2020	307
Simon realizes that his scanner was picking up Amelia, whose number is still long, who tells them that One-One has no idea that they exist and that the cars have been glitching, most notably the ones with turtles. She further mocks their ideals and tells them the purpose of the train. The group run from her, using winged serpents as cover, and hide in a cave where Grace angrily berates Simon when he asks to check her number. As Simon leaves, Hazel becomes furious with Grace calming her. Simon exits the car and heads back to see the Cat, who he identifies as Samantha. Samantha tells him that she has regretted abandoning him and did not mean to leave him when he was a child. Simon asks that he have something to "help" Grace and she gives him a miniature tape extractor; warning him of using it responsibly.
28	8	"The Hey Ho Whoa Car"	Justin Michael	Angela Kim and Marie Lum	August 20, 2020	308
Grace and Hazel are rescued from a serpent from Amelia, who properly introduces herself to them. As they exit the car, Simon arrives to warn them about her, only to be knocked back by a force field. Amelia reveals that she was the "true conductor" that they have convinced themselves of. They head into the Hey Ho Whoa Car, a giant cavern with a pit filling with stones that shout "Hey", "Ho", and "Whoa". Amelia tells them what they are supposed to do on the train and her story, resulting in Simon becoming angered. Hazel reveals her true form and Amelia deduces that she is a failed attempt at recreating her husband Alrick. She plans to quarantine her and Grace seemingly agrees, adding that they should camp for the night. Simon uses the tape extractor on Grace and discovers that she has been keeping Hazel's secret, leaving him dejected.
29	9	"The Origami Car"	Alex Horab	Kellye Perdue and Ryann Shannon	August 27, 2020	309
Grace offers Hazel to join the Apex anyway despite her previous comment, but she instead opts to travel with Amelia in the hopes of learning more from her. Grace is heavily distraught over Hazel leaving as she and Simon enter the Origami Car. The two get into an argument and Simon pulls the tape machine on her. In Grace's mind, it is revealed that Grace's parents were coldly distant and she acts out to be noticed. She recalls meeting Amelia as the conductor when she first enters the train, though it is less majestic than she remembered, and Simon accuses her of lying to him. She sees her and Simon's first meeting and formation before Simon reveals that he knows she lied to her about Hazel. As she tries to apologize, Simon, with his number reaching his neck, leaves her trapped in her mind.
30	10	"The New Apex"	Justin Michael	Diana Huh and Jacob Winkler	August 27, 2020	310
Grace is haunted by visions of Hazel, blaming her for Tuba's death, and saying her delusions about the train and the denizens are just an excuse for her lack of courage. Grace finally admits that she has been lying to herself and that Hazel deserved better, causing her number to go down significantly, and allowing her to escape her tape. Aiding the Origami Car denizens trampled by Simon, Grace finds her way back to the Mall Car only to discover that Simon has turned the Apex against her. As they try to throw her into the train wheels, Grace reveals to them the truth about Amelia. Simon fights her on the bridge between cars, where they are attacked by a Ghom. Grace distracts the Ghom and saves Simon from falling into the wheels, but Simon kicks Grace off the walkway, causing his number to rise all the way up across his face. Grace is rescued by the Origami Car denizens. The Ghom returns and drains the pinned Simon of his own life force, disintegrating him. Later in the Mall Car, Grace tells the Apex she is dissolving the group, and they must all find their own answers. As she delivers this speech, the Apex’s numbers begin to go down.

=== Book Four: Duet (2021) ===
No. overall	No. in season	Title	Written by	Storyboarded by	Original release date	Prod. code
31	1	"The Twin Tapes"	Justin Michael	Angela Kim and Marie Lum	April 15, 2021	401
Ryan Akagi and Min-Gi Park are childhood friends with a shared interest in music. But while Ryan remains eager to become a rock star, Min-Gi has grown more hesitant to the idea. Nevertheless, they plan that once they graduate from high school, they will tour all of Canada and eventually perform in New York. As their group, Chicken Choice Judy, is about to perform for a high school competition, Min-Gi backs out at the last minute. After graduation, Ryan begins touring for small audiences, while Min-Gi stays and works at a diner as he applies to universities. Ryan returns and urges Min-Gi to come with him to a performance in New York, stealing Min-Gi's diner keys. Min-Gi chases Ryan on the train to New York before both get sucked onto the Infinity Train. When they arrive, One-One explains to Amelia that they must resolve their issues to leave the train.
32	2	"The Iceberg Car"	Lindsay Katai	Kellye Perdue and Ryann Shannon	April 15, 2021	402
Ryan and Min-Gi awaken in a glacier-filled car, with the number 202 on their hands. They meet Kez, a floating service bell, who poorly attempts to tell them where they are. She is being pursued by the inhabitants of the car. Kez shows the boys a thermostat-like device that changes the era of the car, cycling through scenes that range from prehistoric jungles to futuristic dystopias; the pursuers, whose forms change with the era, are upset that Kez broke the device. Ryan and Min-Gi fight over the device until they settle on a futuristic city, in which the pursuers resemble aliens. Having restored the device's to its standard setting, they are able to open the exit door. The aliens, still upset, chase them, but Kez messes with the device again as they escape. Kez offers to take Ryan and Min-Gi to her home. They enter the next car, the Old West Car, and are immediately confronted by a posse of insects, led by a caterpillar sheriff.
33	3	"The Old West Car"	Alex Horab	Diana Huh and Jacob Winkler	April 15, 2021	403
Kez distracts the insects as she, Ryan and Min-Gi escape into the town. They go into a tea saloon that is run by Samantha the Cat. After Ryan "flirts" with her, Samantha is intrigued to discover that not only did Ryan and Min-Gi get on the train together, but that their numbers are synced together, and she decides to save them from their pursuers. However, she sells them out when she is offered a bounty and the three are imprisoned. Kez escapes from the jail cell on her own. Ryan and Min-Gi manage to unlock the cell, but they are caught and immediately brought to court. The caterpillar sheriff metamorphoses into a Judge Morpho, a butterfly, to preside over the proceedings. She immediately declares them guilty for aiding Kez, who defiled a copy of their law. Ryan and Min-Gi are brought to a bug zapper, but with the help of Kez and Samantha, they create a distraction and escape. Ryan and Min-Gi meet up with Kez and Samantha and have a laugh, and their numbers to go down to 180. As Morpho vows revenge, the aliens from the previous car arrive seeking Kez.
34	4	"The Pig Baby Car"	Lindsay Katai	Angela Kim and Marie Lum	April 15, 2021	404
The group ends up in a car that resembles a giant kitchen. Kez wears a chef hat to disguise herself as they encounter a giant pig baby and his caretaker, a small ceramic cow, who tells them to cook something for "Pig Baby". The kitchen only has a single cookbook of unpleasant recipes; Ryan and Min-Gi prepare one dish after another, but Pig Baby rejects them all. They run out of butter, and Kez explains that she was expelled from this car earlier after microwaving a lot of butter. They scrape butter from the microwave and make perfect brownies. Their numbers go down to 172, and Min-Gi, recognizing that Ryan has learned how to slow down, concludes that the numbers must be meant for Ryan. Both their numbers immediately go back up to 202. They serve Pig Baby the brownies, but the cow creamer insists they stay. They see the exit door in Pig Baby's mouth and reveal Kez, causing him to cry. They escape through the door and continue their journey, with Min-Gi deciding he has nothing to learn on the train.
35	5	"The Astro Queue Car"	Alex Horab	Tracy Liang and Christina Tsui	April 15, 2021	405
Min-Gi continues to mock and belittle Ryan so that he can "learn a lesson". They end up in a car where spacesuit-wearing astronauts wait in a long line, extending through several portals, to enter a club. Min-Gi suggests waiting in line to gain admission to the club, but Ryan tries to come up with other plans. All Ryan's plans fail, but rather than help, Min-Gi criticizes Ryan's attempts. Eventually, Ryan tries running through the portals and nearly falls off a cliff. Min-Gi insults Ryan, but knocks over several astronauts and learns that they are all dead. As Min-Gi realize that his plan would not have worked either, and he needs to change too, their number decreases and then increases again. They gain entrance to the club by convincing the bouncer that their band, Chicken Choice Judy, is expected to perform. When they enter, their heavy gravity boots lock to the ground and Kez started glitching; they are suddenly confronted by the Steward.
36	6	"The Party Car"	Justin Michael	Diana Huh and Jacob Winkler	April 15, 2021	406
The Steward returns Ryan and Min-Gi's outfits and belongings to them and leaves. In the club, they meet Kez's friends; but it quickly becomes apparent that they consider her a goof-up and poke fun at her misfortunes. Ryan and Min-Gi go to the green room to prepare for their performance. Min-Gi for once feels excited to perform with Ryan, and they recall the first song they ever wrote together. However, as Ryan steps onstage to perform, Min-Gi finds his keys in his pocket and bails. Ryan, alone onstage with a hostile audience, angrily tries to leave the car, but Kez tells him that the party needs to be a success in order for them to leave. Ryan finds Min-Gi hiding in the bathroom, and he admits that he was not ready and that he is unsure what their end goal is. They reminisce and begin to play privately. Kez's friends tell her that they did not expect much from her, but that they find it funny, making her feel sad. She joins the boys, who play their own song, and their numbers go down to 127 as the exit opens for them.
37	7	"The Art Gallery Car"	Alex Horab	Angela Kim and Marie Lum	April 15, 2021	407
The group enters the Art Gallery Car in high spirits. Strange shadows begin to appear on the walls as Min-Gi and Ryan suddenly begin to act hostile towards one another, their numbers climbing back up to 202. Kez attempts to act as a go-between for the two of them, but they continue to voice their frustrations as shadowy arms appear to engulf them. Min-Gi is upset that Ryan went away without thinking of him, while Ryan accuses Min-Gi of being a shut-in with no future. Kez brings them together as Ryan examines a piece of art that turns out to be the door. He and Kez fall through, but leave Min-Gi behind. A monster, the source of the shadows, appears and tries to absorb Min-Gi. Ryan and Kez can only look back; Ryan declares that he would never leave Min-Gi. His number reaches 0 and the portal home opens, and he considers using it but rejects it; his number goes back up to 115 and the portal disappears. Min-Gi finally manages to find the exit, and, upon escaping, accuses Ryan of leaving him again.
38	8	"The Mega Maze Car"	Justin Michael	Tracy Liang and Christina Tsui	April 15, 2021	408
The next car is Kez's home: a castle surrounded by a giant stone maze. Kez flies above to direct the boys through the maze, and they discuss their emotional baggage with each other as they walk. Min-Gi admits that his life has hit a dead end, and he is only going to university because his parents want him to; he envies Ryan's freedom. Ryan believes that Min-Gi is lucky to have people that care about him, and that despite his freedom, he has no direction in life and misses his friend. Suddenly, the aliens from the Iceberg Car, Judge Morpho, Pig Baby, Ms. Cow, and the Bouncer arrive, seeking revenge on the three. A chase ensues, but the pursuers' efforts interfere with each other, enabling the group to reach the castle. The Bouncer attempts to block Ryan and Min-Gi from the castle, but they are able to get past him by using the same trick they had earlier: telling him they're the band for the venue. Upon entering, Kez introduces the boys to her roommate Morgan, though there doesn't seem to be anyone else in the castle. Instead, a thundering voice declares that Kez shouldn't have come back.
39	9	"The Castle Car"	Lindsay Katai	Diana Huh and Jacob Winkler	April 15, 2021	409
Morgan is actually the castle itself, and is upset that Kez brought Ryan and Min-Gi to "replace" Jeremy, another passenger who once lived there. Morgan holds them prisoner, mocking the idea of them replacing Jeremy, and the boys berate Kez for not thinking about others and for never apologizing for her actions, telling her to leave. As they look for a way to escape, Min-Gi reads Jeremy's diary. The last entry records that at some point, Kez said something to him that freaked him out, and he decided to talk to her at breakfast. The boys confront Kez, and she reveals that, before getting on the train, Jeremy was in a car crash that killed his mother and sister. When she convinced him that it wasn't his fault, his number went to 0, and he left. The boys tell her that she did the right thing, but they are interrupted by the arrival of the Steward, speaking in a different voice. She tells them they are on their own, removes their boots, flies out the window, and explodes. Ryan and Min-Gi's number circles back to 202. Ryan breaks down into laughter as Min-Gi looks on.
40	10	"The Train to Nowhere"	Alex Horab	Angela Kim and Marie Lum	April 15, 2021	410
Ryan sulks in his room as Min-Gi tries to get him to speak. He reveals that he had an exit, but refused to take it, even though he considered it. Min-Gi practices on his mini-synthesizer, and Ryan decides to finally join him. As the two of them play, Min-Gi's number finally goes down to 0 and a portal opens, but he refuses to leave. Morgan gets angry and decides to let in their enemies, who have regrouped. As they enter the main room, Kez finally musters an apology to those she has harmed, and all but Morpho accept the apology. Morpho attempts to attack Kez, but Ryan bats her into the fireplace and out of the castle. Ryan uses the era device to repair Morgan before admitting that he got ahead of himself as well, and his number reaches 0. Morgan decides to leave Kez alone, and the boys finally head home. Later, in Utica, New York, Chicken Choice Judy perform their song "Train to Nowhere". An audience member asks if they have a cassette of their song. Ryan happily answers, "We're working on it."
