= Observer Media =

American online media company, founded 2007

- Industry: Online and print media
- Founded: 2007; 19 years ago
- Founder: Jared Kushner
- Headquarters: Manhattan, New York City, US
- Key people: Joseph Meyer (Chairman & Publisher); James R. Freiman (Chief Executive Officer)
- Website: www.observermedia.com

Observer Media is an American online media company. The company was formed through several acquisitions, including acquisition of The New York Observer in 2007. Observer Media is based in Lower Manhattan, New York City, and was owned by businessman Jared Kushner until 2016, when he transferred his ownership into a family trust, through which his brother-in-law Joseph Meyer took over his former role as publisher and chairman in 2017. It currently publishes the Commercial Observer and Observer. As of November 2016, Observer Media announced it would no longer print the New York Observer. The Observer site is a consolidation of several notable online properties, including The Gallerist, BetaBeat, NY Politicker, and PolitickerNJ.

== History ==
In 2007, Jared Kushner began acquiring and merging several print and online media publications into the Observer brand, including The New York Observer, BetaBeat, Gallerist, NY Politicker, SCENE Magazine, and PolitickerNJ. These acquisitions became integrated into the website observer.com (Gallerist was integrated in September 2014, PolitickerNY in March 2014, BetaBeat in January 2015, and PolitickerNJ in August 2016).

In March 2012, Observer Media launched The Commercial Observer, a commercial real estate publication. The organization has since received various awards, including "NAREE's 65th Annual Real Estate Journalism" award, "Best Team Report Silver" award (2013), and "Best Weekly Newspaper Report Silver" award (2014). The Commercial Observer publishes at commercialobserver.com, and also publishes weekly print edition.

Joseph Meyer now owns the company through his investment firm Observer Capital, and serves as chairman and publisher. Jared Kushner has no ownership stake in and has no role in the company.

James R. Freiman was named CEO of Observer Media in November 2022. Previously, Michael Rose, the former president of What to Expect, a subsidiary of Everyday Health, was named CEO of Observer Media on October 9, 2019.

== Format ==
The Observer online site includes four main content categories: Business, Art, Lifestyle & Culture. Observer Media discontinued a print edition called The New York Observer in November 2016. The Commercial Observer online site includes sections such as Leases, Finance, Sales, Design & Construction, Technology, Markets and Events.

== Controversy ==
In April 2016, former editor-in-chief Ken Kurson was criticized for providing "input" to Donald Trump in a speech given at the annual AIPAC conference. The Observer was also criticized in 2014 for an investigative piece on former New York Attorney General Eric Schneiderman. In July 2016, Observer staff journalist Dana Schwartz published an open letter to her boss Jared Kushner criticizing him for his involvement in Trump's (Kushner's father-in-law) presidential campaign. Shortly thereafter, Kushner responded to the letter defending his contributions to Trump's presidential campaign. Both articles were widely circulated in social media, and attracted attention from various media outlets.
