= Infinity Train =

American animated television series

- Genre: Anthology; Science fiction Fantasy; Comedy-drama; Psychological thriller Mystery
- Created by: Owen Dennis
- Showrunner: Owen Dennis
- Voices of: Ashley Johnson; Jeremy Crutchley; Owen Dennis; Ernie Hudson; Kate Mulgrew; Lena Headey; Robbie Daymond; Bradley Whitford; Ben Mendelsohn; Kirby Howell-Baptiste; Kyle McCarley; Isabella Abiera; Diane Delano; Johnny Young; Sekai Murashige; Minty Lewis; Margo Martindale; J.K. Simmons; Margaret Cho
- Theme music composer: Chrome Canyon; Owen Dennis (episode 1)
- Composer: Chrome Canyon
- Country of origin: United States
- Original language: English
- No. of seasons: 4
- No. of episodes: 40 (list of episodes)

Production
- Executive producers: Owen Dennis; Jennifer Pelphrey; Tramm Wigzell; Brian A. Miller; Rob Sorcher
- Producer: Keith Mack
- Running time: 11 minutes
- Production company: Cartoon Network Studios

Original release
- Network: Cartoon Network
- Release: August 5, 2019 – January 10, 2020
- Network: HBO Max
- Release: August 13, 2020 – April 15, 2021

Infinity Train is an American animated television series created by Owen Dennis and produced by Cartoon Network Studios. The series is set on a gigantic, mysterious, and seemingly endless train traveling through a barren landscape, whose cars contain a variety of bizarre, fantastical, and impossible environments. Passengers on the train proceed from car to car by completing challenges which help them resolve their psychological trauma and emotional issues. Every season of Infinity Train (referred to as a "Book", each with its own separate subtitle) follows its own storyline and set of characters, although some characters appear across multiple seasons.

The pilot for the series was released by Cartoon Network on November 1, 2016, before being picked-up for a full miniseries due to positive reception, which premiered on Cartoon Network on August 5, 2019. After the conclusion of the first season, Cartoon Network announced that Infinity Train would continue as an anthology series. The second season debuted on Cartoon Network on January 6, 2020. The third season began airing on HBO Max on August 13, 2020, with ten episodes airing across three weeks, and the fourth season was released in its entirety on April 15, 2021.

All four seasons of Infinity Train have received critical acclaim for their complex themes and characters, writing, uniqueness, visual animation style, and voice acting. In August 2020, Dennis stated that, although he wanted to continue the series for a total of eight seasons, most of the crew had been laid off and the series was at risk of not being renewed for a fifth season; Dennis suggested that HBO Max might be concerned that the series' stories and themes were too dark and unappealing to children. Promotional material for the fourth season refers to it as the final season of Infinity Train. In August 2022, the series was removed from HBO Max; in October 2023, the show was removed from digital purchase platforms.

== Synopsis ==
The series is set on a seemingly infinite train traveling through a barren landscape; the cars of the train contain a variety of bizarre and fantastical environments. The passengers on the train are people it picks up who have unresolved emotional issues or trauma. As they travel through the train's cars, their adventures within give them the opportunity to confront and resolve their emotional problems, represented by a glowing number on the palm of their right hand that goes down as they successfully confront these issues. Once they resolve their issues and their number reaches zero, a portal opens and they are able to leave the train and return home.

The first season focuses on Tulip Olsen, a girl struggling with her parents’ recent divorce. She is accompanied by a small, confused robot named "One-One", and Atticus, the ruler of a kingdom of talking corgis. She eventually uncovers many of the train's secrets and confronts Amelia, a passenger who, instead of resolving her trauma from her husband's death, has usurped the role of Conductor from One-One and tried to take control of the train. Before leaving the train, Tulip persuades Amelia to try to adapt to the changes in her life.

In one first-season episode, Tulip frees her own reflection from the mirror world and the two part ways. The second season focuses on the emancipated Mirror Tulip ("MT"), now on the run from enforcers attempting to execute her as punishment for abandoning her role as Tulip's reflection. She teams up with Jesse, a new train passenger, as well as Alan Dracula, a silent deer with a variety of powers. She helps Jesse leave the train by helping him learn to stand up for himself, and he returns to the train to help her escape to the outside world as well.

The third season centers on Grace and Simon, the leaders of a cult of rogue passengers, known as 'The Apex', who vandalize the train and assault its denizens to keep their numbers high, believing that the true purpose of the train is to stay as long as possible as a reward. Their travels with a young girl named Hazel and her gorilla friend, Tuba, make Grace more sympathetic to the train's denizens. After Simon kills Tuba, it is revealed that Hazel herself is one of Amelia's creations, and Grace realizes what she thought she knew about the train is wrong. After fighting off Simon's attempt to usurp control, Grace begins facing up to and mending her mistakes.

Set decades earlier, during the period while Amelia is establishing control over the train, the fourth and final season centers on Ryan and Min-Gi, two childhood best friends who want to become famous musicians. Their relationship is strained due to Ryan's brashness and Min-Gi's fear of the future. While on the train, they meet a talking service bell named Kez who has trouble owning up to her mistakes. Ryan and Min-Gi come to realize that they need each other in order for them to move forward in life, while Kez finally apologizes to the train denizens she harmed.

== Episodes ==
Book	Name	Episodes	Originally released		
Book	Name	Episodes	First released	Last released	Network
Pilot			November 2, 2016 (Note: This is the date the pilot launched on YouTube; the first television broadcast of the pilot was on February 11, 2017.)		YouTube
1	The Perennial Child	10	August 5, 2019	August 9, 2019	Cartoon Network
2	Cracked Reflection	10	January 6, 2020	January 10, 2020	Cartoon Network
3	Cult of the Conductor	10	August 13, 2020	August 27, 2020	HBO Max
4	Duet	10	April 15, 2021		HBO Max

== Characters ==
=== Overview ===
Character		Voiced by	Seasons			
Character		Voiced by	Book 1	Book 2	Book 3	Book 4
Main characters
Tulip Olsen		Ashley Johnson	Main	Mentioned		
Lake / "MT" (Mirror Tulip)		Ashley Johnson	Guest	Main	Pictured	
One-One / One	Glad-One	Jeremy Crutchley	Main	Recurring	Mentioned	
One-One / One	Sad-One	Owen Dennis	Main	Recurring	Mentioned	Guest
Atticus		Ernie Hudson	Main	Mentioned		
Jesse Cosay		Robbie Daymond		Main	Mentioned	
Alan Dracula		Silent character		Main		Guest (Note: In a deleted scene, a table appearing in "The Party Car" is revealed to be a shapeshifting Alan Dracula.)
Grace Monroe		Kirby Howell-Baptiste	Pictured	Recurring	Main	
Simon Laurent		Kyle McCarley	Pictured	Recurring	Main	
Hazel		Isabella Abiera			Main	
Tuba		Diane Delano			Main	
Min-Gi Park		Johnny Young				Main
Ryan Akagi		Sekai Murashige				Main
Kez		Minty Lewis				Main
Recurring characters
The Cat / Samantha		Kate Mulgrew	Recurring	Guest	Recurring	Guest
Randall		Rhys Darby	Recurring	Recurring	Guest	
Amelia Hughes		Lena Headey	Recurring	Mentioned	Recurring	Recurring
The Steward		Ashley Johnson	Recurring	Cameo	Cameo	Recurring
Ghoms		Dee Bradley Baker	Recurring	Guest	Recurring	
Megan Olsen		Audrey Wasilewski	Recurring			
Andy Olsen		Mark Fite	Recurring			
Mikayla		Reagan Gomez-Preston	Recurring			
Reflection Police	Agent Mace	Ben Mendelsohn	Guest	Recurring		
Reflection Police	Agent Sieve	Bradley Whitford	Guest	Recurring		
Toad / Terrence		Owen Dennis		Recurring		
Nate Cosay		Justin Felbinger		Recurring		
Lucy		Jenna Davis		Cameo	Recurring	
Todd		Antonio Raul Corbo		Cameo	Recurring	
Frank		Owen Dennis			Recurring	
One		Jeremy Crutchley	Mentioned		Mentioned	Recurring
Parka Denizens	One	Kari Wahlgren				Recurring
Parka Denizens	Two	Kari Wahlgren				Recurring
Parka Denizens	Three	Keith Ferguson				Recurring
Judge Morpho		Margo Martindale				Recurring
Cow Creamer		Audrey Wasilewski				Recurring
Pig Baby/Toddler		J. K. Simmons				Recurring
Nigel		Silent character				Recurring
Morgan		Margaret Cho				Recurring

=== Main ===
==== Book 1 – The Perennial Child ====
- Tulip Olsen (Ashley Johnson) is a 13-year-old girl struggling with her parents' divorce who finds herself trapped on the train when trying to get to a game-design camp. She is analytical, down-to-earth, and determined to get off the train.
  - Naomi Hansen and Lily Sanfelippo voice younger versions of Tulip, respectively at age 5 and from age 6 to 8.
- One-One is a spherical robot consisting of two separate hemisphere-shaped robots, formerly collectively known simply as One. In Book 1, One-One accompanies Tulip on her journey, and eventually learns that it is the rightful Conductor of the train. At the end of Book 1, One-One resumes its duties as Conductor, overseeing the operations of the train and passengers. Throughout the background of Book 4, set in 1986, One bonds with Amelia, loosening restrictions on the passengers, before she usurps his position as the Conductor.
  - Glad-One (Jeremy Crutchley) is the exuberant and optimistic part of One-One.
  - Sad-One (Owen Dennis) is the morose and pessimistic part of One-One.
- Atticus (Ernie Hudson) is a talking Corgi and the king of Corginia, one of the train cars. He accompanies Tulip on her journey.

Guest voices for Book One include Matthew Rhys and Ron Funches.

==== Book 2 – Cracked Reflection ====
- "MT" (Ashley Johnson) is Tulip's reflection, freed from the mirror world by Tulip in episode 7 of Book 1. At the start of Book 2, she has been living on the train as a fugitive from the reflection police. She accompanies Jesse on his journey through the train while struggling with her sense of identity as an independent person, rather than Tulip's reflection or a construct of the train. Upon leaving the train at the end of Book 2, she names herself Lake.
- Jesse Cosay (Robbie Daymond) is a passenger who becomes MT's friend and helps them escape the train. He is easygoing and friendly, but has a hard time resisting peer pressure; his experience on the train teaches him how to stand up for his friends and his younger brother. Upon initially leaving the train in the middle of Book 2, he returns in order to help MT leave too.
- Alan Dracula is a magical silent, shapeshifting white-tailed deer, a denizen of the train who accompanies MT and Jesse on their journey, serving as their guide and mount.

Guest voices for Book Two include Wayne Knight, Laraine Newman, Nea Marshall Kudi, Bill Corbett, and Rhys Darby.

==== Book 3 – Cult of the Conductor ====
- Grace Monroe (Kirby Howell-Baptiste) is the African-American young adult leader of the Apex, a gang of passengers who aim to raise their numbers to remain on the train indefinitely, and believe One-One to be an impostor who usurped the role of Conductor. After appearing as a secondary antagonist in Book 2, Grace returns as one of the main protagonists of Book 3, in which she gradually begins to see the error of her ways and decides to try to fix her mistakes.
  - Brooke Singleton voices Grace as a child
- Simon Laurent (Kyle McCarley) is Grace's second-in-command and best friend, who first appears alongside her in Book 2. He is a clinical narcissist who has a murderous hatred of denizens and believes that his actions are justified, due to his past experiences in the train along with Grace enabling his negative impulses. Returning as one of the main protagonists of Book 3, Simon begins to double down on his behavior due to his unwillingness to acknowledge his mistakes and change, resulting in his relationship with Grace slowly deteriorating. After usurping her position as the leader of the Apex, Simon attempts to execute Grace for her betrayal before being killed by a Ghom.
  - Samuel Faraci voices Simon as a child
- Hazel (Isabella Abiera) is a 6-year-old girl who travels the train. Although she has a number on her hand, it doesn't glow; unknown to her, she is actually a human-turtle hybrid of the train created by Amelia's experiments. Initially cheerful, joyous, and optimistic, she later becomes disillusioned with both Grace and Simon after the latter kills Tuba and the former turns her back on her, leading her to lose trust in her former friends and leave with Amelia.
- Tuba (Diane Delano) is Hazel's gorilla friend, adoptive mother and protector, a denizen of the train. She distrusts both Grace and Simon due to their differing agendas, albeit begrudgingly assists them on their journey along with Hazel. She is later killed by Simon when he takes advantage of the moving train cars to throw her off the train.

Guest voices for Book Three include Rhys Darby, Edi Patterson, Phil LaMarr, and Alfred Molina.

==== Book 4 – Duet ====
- Min-Gi Park (Johnny Young) is a young man who is hesitant to pursue his dreams of being a musician and feels pressured to live a conventional life instead.
- Ryan Akagi (Sekai Murashige) is Min-Gi's best friend, who aspires to become a famous musician and tends to make rash decisions.
- Kez (Minty Lewis) is a sentient concierge bell who accompanies Ryan and Min; her thoughtless behavior has made her many enemies among the train's other denizens.

Guest voices for Book Four include Steve Park, Thomas Lennon, and Donald Faison.

=== Recurring ===
- The Cat (Kate Mulgrew) is a talking cat who is a collector and con artist, and runs a variety of businesses on the train. In Book 1, she is an unwilling agent for Amelia who attempts to capture the heroes before being betrayed and later assisting them in reaching her. Book 3 reveals that her name is Samantha, and she was Simon's companion when he first boarded the train. (Recurring in Book 1 and Book 3; guest in Book 2 and Book 4)
- Randall (Rhys Darby) is a liquid person who can create conscious duplicates of himself at will. (recurring in Book 1; guest in Book 2 and Book 3)
- Amelia Hughes (Lena Headey) is a passenger who overthrew One-One and usurped his position as the Conductor, hoping to use the train to recreate her dead husband Alrick Timmens (Matthew Rhys). In Book 3, Amelia works with One-One to make amends and undo the mistakes she made on the train. (recurring in Book 1, Book 3 and Book 4)
- The Steward (Ashley Johnson) is a menacing robot that assists the Conductor. (Recurring Book 1, Book 4; Cameos Books 2–3)
- Ghoms (Dee Bradley Baker) are dog/cockroach-like creatures that inhabit the Wasteland outside the train and attempt to suck the life-force out of the living. (recurring in Book 1 and Book 3; guest in Book 2)
- Megan Olsen (Audrey Wasilewski) is Tulip's struggling mother and Andy's ex-wife who works as a nurse. (recurring in Book 1)
- Andy Olsen (Mark Fite) is Tulip's depressed father and Megan's ex-husband. (recurring in Book 1)
- Mikayla (Reagan Gomez-Preston) is Tulip's best friend before she gets on the train. (recurring in Book 1)
- The Reflection Police, or "Flecs" are a pair of officers pursuing MT in order to destroy her for abandoning her responsibility as Tulip's reflection. (guest in Book 1; recurring in Book 2)
  - Agent Mace (Ben Mendelsohn) is the gruff senior partner of the team.
  - Agent Sieve (Bradley Whitford) is the more upbeat junior partner to Mace.
- Toad / Terrance (Owen Dennis) is a toad whom passengers must kick in order to exit the Toad Car. (recurring in Book 2)
- Nathan "Nate" Cosay (Justin Felbinger) is Jesse's younger brother. (recurring in Book 2)
- Lucy (Jenna Davis) is a young girl and member of the Apex. She lost an eye because of a harpoon pack. (appears as a cameo in Book 2; recurring in Book 3)
- Todd (Antonio Raul Corbo) is a young boy and member of the Apex. (guest in Book 2; recurring in Book 3)
- One (Jeremy Crutchley) is the conductor of the train and the previous combined form of One-One. (recurring in Book 4)
- Parka Denizens (Kari Wahlgren and Keith Ferguson) are a trio of parka-wearing train denizens, who seek retribution against Kez for unintentionally transforming them. (recurring in Book 4)
- Cow Creamer (Audrey Wasilewski) is a French porcelain cow raising a giant sentient piglet, who pursues Kez for making her ward cry. (recurring in Book 4)
- Pig Baby/Toddler (J. K. Simmons) is a giant sentient piglet raised by Cow Creamer. (recurring in Book 4)
- Judge Morpho (Margo Martindale) is a caterpillar sheriff of an Old West town who metamorphoses into a butterfly judge, who seeks to punish Kez for leaving a tea stain on their town charter. (recurring in Book 4)
- Nigel is a silent astronaut bouncer who guards the entrance to a space-themed nightclub, who also pursues Kez for getting him fired from his job. (recurring in Book 4)
- Morgan (Margaret Cho) is a sentient castle whom Kez used to reside in. (recurring in Book 4)

== Production history ==
=== Conception and influences ===
Prior to creating Infinity Train, Owen Dennis worked as a storyboard artist on Regular Show. Dennis conceived Infinity Train in 2010, originally as a film. He was inspired by "the feeling of waking up in an unsettling space" which he felt while on a return flight to the U.S. from China. Claiming when he had "woken up. I looked around, and there were a bunch of people staring into screens in the dark in this quiet room. I thought this was kind of creepy. And it sort of started from there." Like protagonist Tulip, Dennis created video games as an amateur in his teens, including point-and-click adventure games and mods for titles such as Half-Life 2 and Unreal Tournament 2004. He has stated that Myst has been one of his primary influences since he was 13, and its influence continued in Infinity Train. He also cites Doctor Who, Agatha Christie, The NeverEnding Story, The Matrix, Philip K. Dick, Star Trek: Voyager, Sliders, and "The Mysterious Stranger" segment from The Adventures of Mark Twain as influences, along with novels such as Nightbirds on Nantucket and The Wolves of Willoughby Chase. Dennis has also described Infinity Train as "Saw for kids," in that each season is essentially a morality play based around machinery designed to help one overcome personal issues and appreciate life.

=== Development ===
Infinity Train has three staff writers, who make up the main story team in addition to showrunner Dennis and supervising producer/director Maddie Queripel. Cole Sanchez served on the story team for Book 1's development but departed to work as supervising producer on Summer Camp Island. The process on each episode was that a writer would make an outline, an expansion of the outline, a script, and then would send it to a team of two board artists. The 'boarders' would have 5 weeks to make thumbnails, then the full boards, and then clean them up, before it would be sent away for animation. The animation is done by Sunmin Image Pictures in Seoul, South Korea using traditional animation methods.

=== 2016 pilot ===
This show was made because of the massive fan reaction to the pilot, and fans are what will help make more happen in the future.

— Beth Elderkin, io9

The pilot was first released on the Cartoon Network App and VOD on November 1, 2016, and released the following day on the official Cartoon Network YouTube channel. The short garnered a million views within its first month of availability and has since gained 5.2 million views as of July 2020, making it the most viewed pilot on the channel while two other originals, Welcome to My Life is the second most viewed pilot, and Twelve Forever (later moved to Netflix) being the third most viewed pilot. A petition to greenlight Infinity Train was made shortly after the pilot was released and garnered over 57,000 signatures. On March 11, 2018, Cartoon Network's official website launched a teaser for Infinity Train that confirmed the pilot had been greenlit as a full series and would premiere in 2019.

=== Full production ===
Tulip, One-One and Atticus as seen in the pilot (top) and in the season 1 episode "The Corgi Car" (bottom).

In July 2018, a sneak peek of the first season was revealed on the Cartoon Network panel at the 2018 San Diego Comic-Con. It was released a couple of hours later on Cartoon Network's social media platforms. A full trailer for Infinity Train was released in June 2019 which was unlocked by playing the show theme on the Infinity Train website. It was later uploaded to Cartoon Network's YouTube channel. On July 11, 2019, the show was confirmed to premiere on August 5, 2019. On July 20, 2019, the first episode was shown during the Infinity Train panel at San Diego Comic-Con. It was then released on the Cartoon Network app and website later that same day. The first season would be 10 episodes long, with two episodes airing each night from August 5 to August 9, 2019. From October 18, 2019, Cartoon Network started uploading a series of Infinity Train shorts onto their app and YouTube channel called "The Train Documentaries", which focused on One-One showing off a number of cars in the train, including "The Green Car", "Tiny Wizard Car", "The Kaiju Car" and "The Tech Support Car".

A promo after the final episode of the first season confirmed the series would return. On November 22, 2019, the Infinity Train website was updated with a new claw machine puzzle. Completing the puzzle leads to a trailer for Book 2. The trailer was then released officially the next day. Book Two debuted on January 6, 2020. On July 6, 2020, Book 3 was officially announced with a release date of August 13, 2020. Unlike its predecessors, it aired on HBO Max instead of Cartoon Network. Dennis revealed in a reply to a tweet that Infinity Train was originally planned to air on HBO Max from the beginning, but due to the streaming service's delay from its original 2019 launch date, the first two seasons were aired on Cartoon Network instead. It was later revealed at San Diego Comic-Con that the book would be titled Cult of the Conductor. Book 3 was released in three batches, with the first five episodes debuting on August 13, the next three on August 20, and the final two on August 27.

On February 17, 2021, Book 4 was officially announced with a teaser trailer containing distorted audio.

=== Cancellation and removal from HBO Max ===
On August 16, 2020, while Infinity Train Book 3 was being released on HBO Max, Dennis reported that though the team had plans for more seasons, the whole crew and most of the production staff had been laid off, and the possibility of a series renewal depended on the series' viewership on HBO Max. On March 11, 2021, it was announced that Infinity Train would end with its fourth season. Dennis clarified on Twitter that he did not intend for it to be the final season, and remains open to continuing the show in the future if given the opportunity. Speaking in a 2025 interview, Dennis stated that the show was simply produced at a bad time – and that the cancellation was the result of Trump administration involvement in the acquisition of Time Warner by AT&T which delayed changes to the company's streaming service by two years.

On August 17, 2022, it was announced that Infinity Train was among 37 series being removed from HBO Max. Two days later, the series was removed from the streaming service. In addition, all references to the show were removed across Cartoon Network's Twitter and YouTube profiles, with Dennis subsequently stating on his Twitter bio that fans would have to resort to online piracy in order to watch the series. The show's soundtrack was later removed from online platforms, though it has since been reinstated. Episodes of the show were, at the time, still able to be purchased digitally on Vudu, Prime Video, and Apple TV+; as of October 2023, Infinity Train has since been removed from digital retailers.

Following its removal from HBO Max, Infinity Train trended on Twitter as fans expressed their frustration and disappointment. Meanwhile, all four seasons of Infinity Train topped the kids and family sale chart on iTunes on August 20, 2022. Additionally, the DVDs for Infinity Train sold out on websites such as Amazon, Walmart, Target, and Best Buy, while the prices of the DVDs on eBay increased.

Despite this, as of 2026 there are a handful of providers and services internationally that still have the show available to watch, a notable example being Sky/NOW TV in the UK as the distribution rights in the country belong to Sky instead of Warner Bros. Discovery; the series had skipped airing on the local Cartoon Network channel and instead premiered on one of Sky's linear channels after being made available on demand.

== Future ==
=== Unproduced seasons ===
Dennis planned for eight seasons of Infinity Train, but only four were produced. When asked what he would like to do with the series in the future, Dennis expressed interest in exploring other time periods of the train, as well as a movie following Amelia's story. Dennis also stated that a season with an older Tulip was considered. In a Reddit AMA on April 16, 2021, the day after Book 4's release, Dennis confirmed that Book 5 would have been the aforementioned Amelia-focused movie, and although a full script had been written, Cartoon Network Studios passed it on because they didn't think it had a "child entry point." Dennis also claimed that books 5, 6, 7, and 8 would have covered the themes of grief, guilt, revenge, and acceptance, respectively, and Book 8 would have touched on Alzheimer's disease. Dennis and series writer Lindsay Katai stated that there were also plans for an Infinity Train Christmas special. On May 8, 2021, Dennis released a mockup frame from the unproduced Book 5 in response to a fan movement to renew the show trending #1 worldwide and in multiple regions on Twitter.

In 2025, Dennis indicated he was still trying to revive the show by pitching it to other distributors. Dennis expects that at some point a distributor in search of an IP will pursue Infinity Train. "There's always going to be some ability to reboot something or bring it back... Okay, the show's canceled. Maybe in 10 years?"

=== Other media ===
Dennis has also expressed interest in doing Infinity Train comic books that "are in canon and could be written by or starring non-Americans." Dennis said that there were plans to make an Infinity Train video game, and there was an Infinity Train VR experience "where you hung out and solved puzzles in Corginia." Dennis also stated that a choose-your-own-adventure novel was considered. However, all of these projects were shelved when company priorities shifted. Gallery Nucleus in Alhambra, California, held an official Infinity Train art show from September 25 to October 3, 2021. The exhibition featured a collection of Infinity Train art by the crew of the show, exclusive Infinity Train merchandise, and a panel featuring the show's creator, Owen Dennis.

== Soundtrack ==
Infinity Train: Book 1 (Original Soundtrack)

Soundtrack album by Infinity Train [feat. Chrome Canyon]
- Released: December 6, 2019
- Genre: Soundtrack
- Length: 47:41
- Label: Cartoon Network
- Producers: Chrome Canyon & Owen Dennis

Infinity Train [feat. Chrome Canyon] chronology
Running Away (Extended) (2019)	Infinity Train: Book 1 (Original Soundtrack) (2019)	Train to Nowhere (2021)

On December 6, 2019, Infinity Train: Book 1 (Original Soundtrack) was released with 27 songs from the first season, including extended versions of "Running Away" and "Boogie Bash (The Monster Party Car)". On April 15, 2021, the song "Train to Nowhere" from Book 4 was released as a single.

== Home media ==
Infinity Train: Book One was released on DVD on April 21, 2020. It includes animatics, commentary tracks, and The Train Documentaries shorts. Infinity Train: Book Two was released on DVD on May 25, 2021.

== Reception ==
=== Critical reception ===
Infinity Train received critical acclaim upon its debut. On Rotten Tomatoes, each season has an approval rating of 100%, with season 1 based on reviews from 8 critics and the other three from 6 each.

Caroline Cao of /Film declared it a "wild triumph", while Nerdist's Andrea Towers declared it "one of the best animated programs of the year." Reuben Baron of CBR favorably compared it to Cartoon Network's animated miniseries Over the Garden Wall in its perfection, hailing it as "a beautifully handled piece of self-contained, character-driven storytelling." Skyler Johnson from Comic Watch called it "excellent", with "emotional depth that is rarely seen in children's television", "witty, clever humor", and "stellar voice action." Emily Ashby of Common Sense Media gave the series 5 out of 5 stars. In her review Ashby praised the positive messages about friendship and self-reflection. Ashby also praised the character of Tulip and the show's emotional moments.

The third season of Infinity Train particularly received critical acclaim. William Hughes of The A.V. Club praised season 3 for its darker themes and messages, hailing it as "the best, most challenging season yet." Petrana Radulovic from Polygon praised the series' complex character arcs and noted the third season is a testament to the infinite potential of the premise. Andrew Kolondra Jr. from The Vanderbilt Hustler called season 3 "genre-defying" and said "thanks to shows like Infinity Train, the modern animation world is finally approaching a point at which it may break free of the notion that animation is 'just for kids.'" Observer Media said the show has grown into its own, developing a compelling world and internal mysteries "that will draw you in with a masterclass in character development to fuel your drive to keep going." Beth Elderkin of io9 praised season 3 for "enhancing the show's dedication to avoiding black-and-white views of morality". Elderkin particularly praised episode 5 of season 3 for its "stunning revelations" saying "it's worth watching for those alone."

The fourth and final season of Infinity Train also received positive notice, though reception was considerably subdued compared to Book 3. The bulk of criticism was directed towards its lighthearted tone after the darker themes of the previous season, as well as its lack of finality, though many critics acknowledged in their reviews that Book 4 was not intended to be the final season. Darren Franich of Entertainment Weekly still hailed it as "a solid season of television." James Poniewozik of The New York Times agreed that the ending was bittersweet with the knowledge that the series was ending before the creative team had planned, but praised its humor and characters.

=== Ratings ===
As the show first entered production, the pilot for Infinity Train was first aired on Cartoon Network on Saturday February 11, 2017, at 6:00 am without any advertisements for it. Despite this, the pilot pulled in approximately 703,000 views amongst the 18–49 year old demographic and ranked as the 33rd of the top 50 original cable telecasts for February 11, 2017.

In September 2020, Parrot Analytics found that the audience demand for Infinity Train was 21.3 times the demand of the average TV series in the United States within 30 days of its release. In December 2020, Observer Media reported that Infinity Train was the fourth most-watched original series on HBO Max since its launch in May.

=== Awards and nominations ===
Infinity Train: The Perennial Child was nominated in 2020 at the 47th Annie Awards in the category Best Special Production.
