= Secret Cities =

American rock band

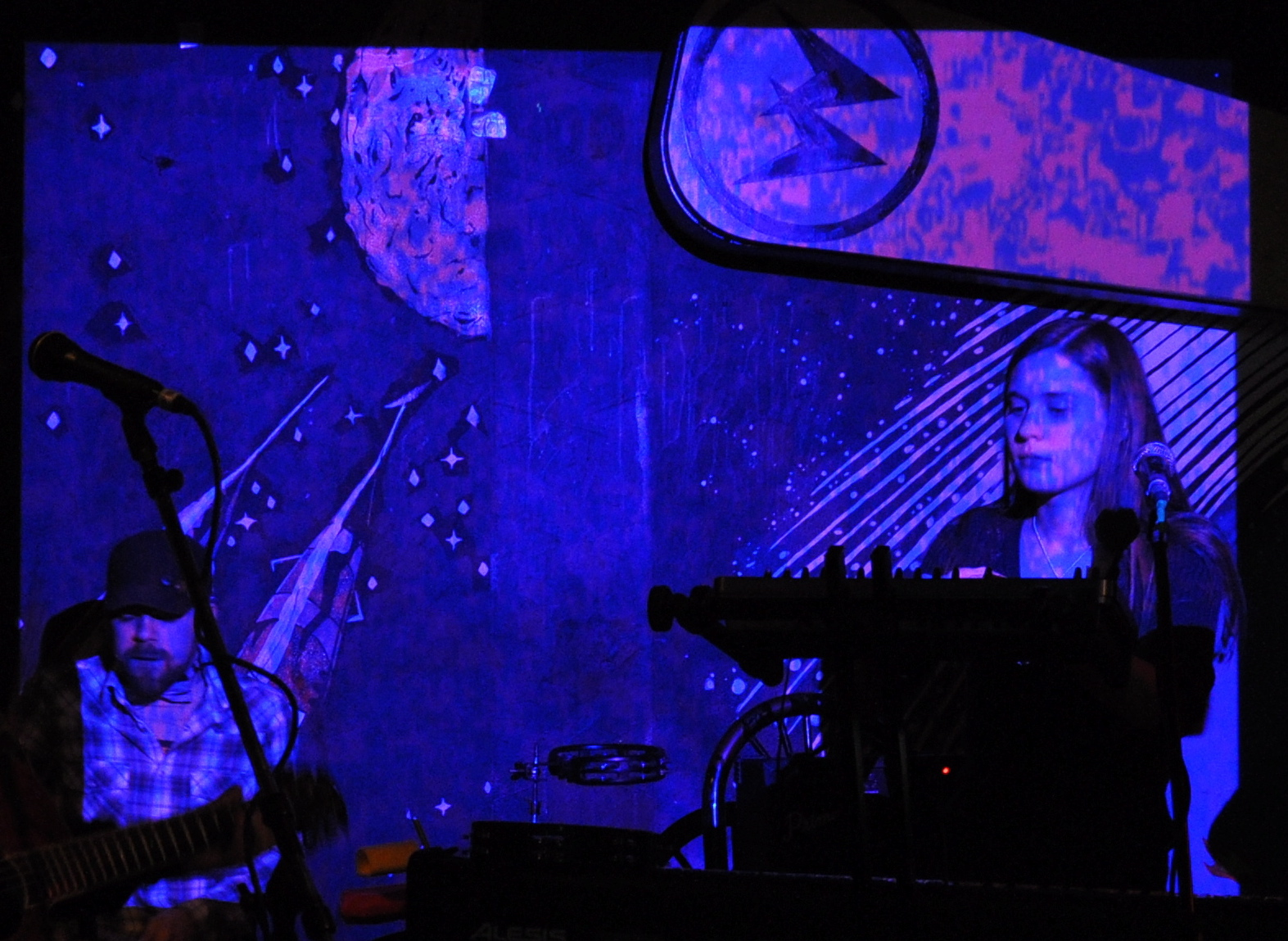

Background information
- Origin: North Dakota, U.S.
- Genres: Indie rock Indietronica
- Years active: 2001–present
- Labels: Western Vinyl
- Members: Charles Gokey; Marie Parker; Alex Abnos

Secret Cities is an American independent rock band from North Dakota, United States. Its founding members, Charles Gokey and Marie J. Parker, met at a band camp in July 2001, while in high school. Although the two lived 500 km apart, in Fargo, North Dakota and Williston, North Dakota, respectively, the two started making music by exchanging tapes in the mail and composing using four-track recorders. They continued in this fashion until February 2004, when the pair changed their name to The Foliage and put out their first release on Fall Records, a split with In Ink Please entitled "How to Make Better Love." In July 2005 the band released a mini-LP, Zurich on Fall Records under the moniker The White Foliage. The group also added a third member, Alex Abnos, during a tour of the Midwest in that year.

In 2008, after an extended hiatus, the band released the Bright Teeth EP, marking a shift toward a pop-ier, more electronic sound. The band changed its name to Secret Cities after signing to Western Vinyl Records in 2010 where they have since released three full-length albums.

== Members ==
- Charles Gokey: vocals, piano, guitar, bass, drums, concertina
- Marie J. Parker: vocals, piano, guitar, french horn, cello, organ, trumpet, saxophone
- Alex Abnos: drums, vocals, percussion, guitar, ukulele

== Discography ==
As The White Foliage:

- How to Make Better Love Split CD with In Ink Please (Fall Records 2004)
- Zurich mini-LP (Fall Records 2004)
- Bright Teeth EP (Fall Records 2008) iTunes only.

As Secret Cities:

- Pink Graffiti LP (Western Vinyl 2010)
- Strange Hearts LP (Western Vinyl 2011)
- Walk Me Home LP (Western Vinyl 2014)
