= Owen Dennis =

American director and animator

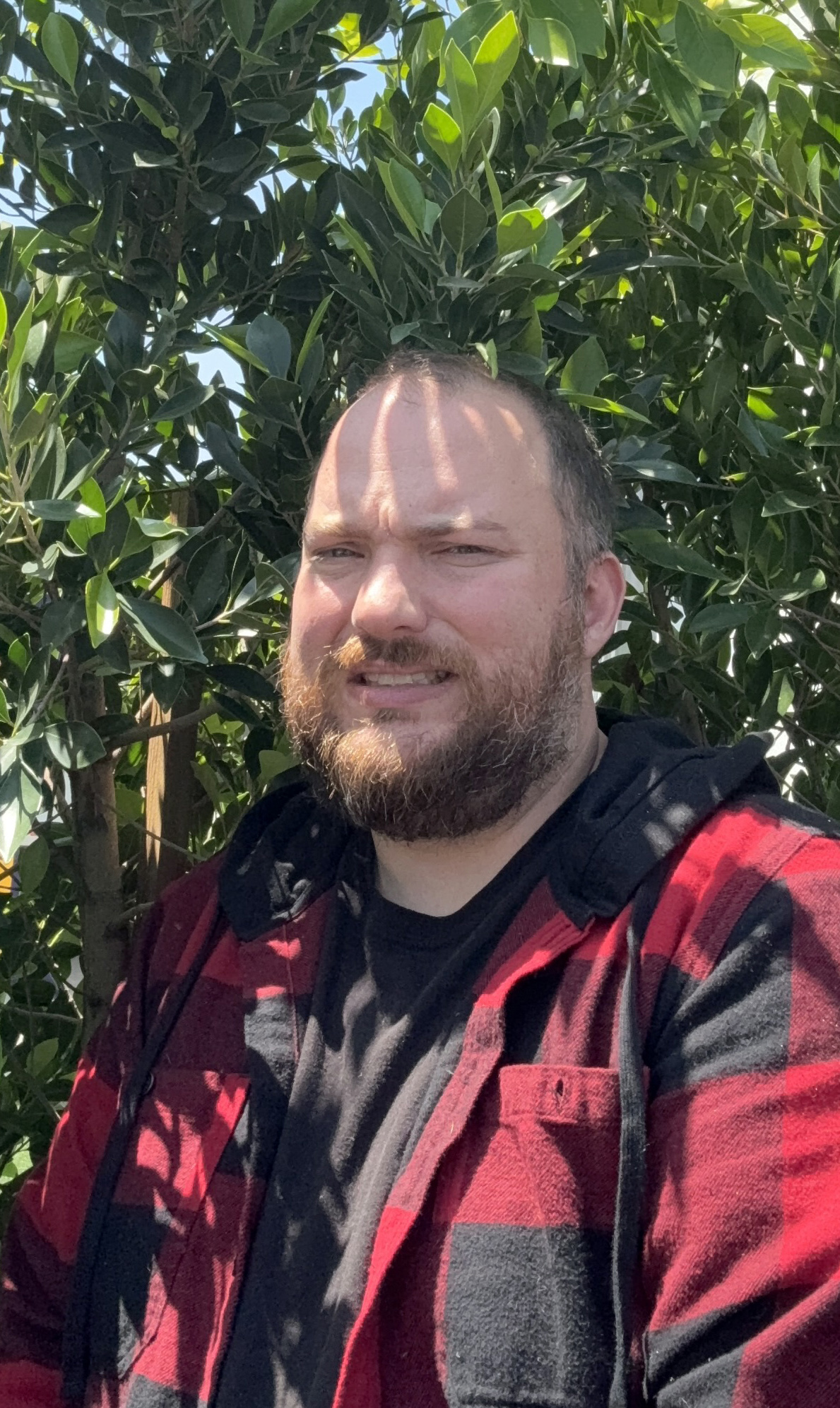
- Dennis in 2025
- Born: March 13, 1987 (age 39); Iowa, U.S.
- Education: Minneapolis College of Art and Design
- Occupations: Animator; director; writer; producer; musician; voice actor
- Years active: 2012–present

Owen Dennis (born March 13, 1987) is an American animation director, writer, producer, musician, and voice actor. A graduate of the Minneapolis College of Art and Design, he worked as a writer and storyboard artist on Cartoon Network's Regular Show, before creating Infinity Train for the studio in 2019 and an animated series based on the video game Among Us in 2026.

== Early life and education ==
Dennis was born in Iowa and grew up in Lake Elmo, Minnesota. According to Dennis, he planned to leave Minnesota to pursue a career in animation at age 12, when he finished in only third place in a local county fair's computer generated imagery (CGI) art contest, despite the judges not awarding a first or second prize. Dennis attended the Minneapolis College of Art and Design, and graduated in 2009.

== Career ==
After graduating, Dennis took a job as an English teacher in China. He spent three years teaching in China, during which he created the virtual band Galactaron, before returning to the United States, moving to Los Angeles to work as a storyboard artist on Cartoon Network's Regular Show. He was a storyboard artist and writer on 33 of the show's episodes as well as 2015's Regular Show: The Movie.

Dennis pitched the idea for his original show Infinity Train to Cartoon Network in 2012. The pilot for the series was released in November 2016; the first season was released in August 2019 on Cartoon Network. Dennis described it as a "kids' mystery-horror-comedy-science-fiction show" that deals with difficult themes, including divorce. According to Dennis, the inspiration for the series came from a plane trip back from China in 2010. A concept for a Galactaron show was also pitched alongside Infinity Train, but Dennis did not want to change its premise to suit executive tastes. In 2020, Dennis was an instructor at the Storyboard Artist Training Program at Cartoon Network Studios. Dennis had written a script for an Infinity Train movie and additional seasons, as well as a video game, but the show was cancelled due to the merger between AT&T and WarnerMedia. The fourth and final season of Infinity Train was released in 2021; the series had been at risk of cancellation before that.

After Infinity Train and other animated shows were removed from streaming platforms in 2022, Dennis criticized Warner Bros. Discovery for removing the show and noted the series can now only be seen through piracy. Dennis said the decision was made against the advice of Cartoon Network, and that neither he or anyone else involved in the production of Infinity Train had been told it would be removed.

In June 2023, Variety reported that Dennis would be executive producer and creator of an animated adaptation of the video game Among Us at CBS Studios. Dennis said that he was interested in the challenge of animating emotion in faceless, featureless characters. Later that year, Variety listed Dennis as one of ten animators to watch in 2023. In October 2024, Dennis said production of the show has been completed. Dennis supported a petition by workers in The Animation Guild to put "guardrails" on the use of generative AI in animation.

On July 7, 2025, Dennis announced on his Patreon page that he founded a production company named Keybot.

== Filmography ==
Year	Title	Creator	Executive Producer	Writer	Actor	Other	Role	Notes
2012	Galactaron – First Contact	Yes	Yes	Yes	Yes	Yes	Singer	Creator, animator
2013–2017	Regular Show	No	No	Yes	No	Yes		Storyboard artist
2015	Regular Show: The Movie	No	No	Yes	No	No		
2019–2021	Infinity Train	Yes	Yes	Yes	Yes	No	One-One / One, Toad / Terrance	Creator
2020	Close Enough	No	No	Yes	No	Yes		Storyboard artist
2025	AJ Goes to the Dog Park	No	Yes	No	No	Yes	Demon Lord Krogloch/Military School Guy	Digital and practical VFX; Director of Demon Lord Krogloch and Carmello Training sequence Songwriter and performer of "Mastering the Carmello Elbow Technique"
2026	Among Us	Yes	Yes	Yes	No	No		Creator
2026	Regular Show: The Lost Tapes	No	No	Yes	No	Yes	—N/a	Storyboard artist Episodes: "Clean the Living Room" and "That's Funny"
