= List of Regular Show episodes =

Regular Show is an American animated sitcom created by J. G. Quintel for Cartoon Network that aired from September 6, 2010, to January 16, 2017. The series revolves around the daily lives of two 23-year-old friends, Mordecai (a blue jay), and Rigby (a raccoon). They work as groundskeepers at a park, and spend their days trying to slack off and entertain themselves by any means. This is much to the chagrin of their boss Benson (a gumball machine) and their coworker Skips (an immortal yeti), but to the delight of park owner Mr. Maellard's son Pops (a man with a lollipop-shaped head). Their other coworkers, Muscle Man (an overweight green man) and Hi-Five Ghost (a ghost with a hand extending from the top of his head) serve as their competitive but friendly rivals.

Quintel initially worked as a writer and staff director for the Cartoon Network series Camp Lazlo and The Marvelous Misadventures of Flapjack before he was offered to produce a short for the network's showcase project The Cartoonstitute. Quintel developed the Regular Show pilot for the project, utilizing characters from his California Institute of the Arts student films The Naïve Man from Lolliland (2005) and 2 in the AM PM (2006). While The Cartoonstitute was ultimately scrapped, Cartoon Network executives approved the production of Regular Show, starting with its first season. Its first two seasons were rating successes, with Nielsen Media Research ranking the series at number one in its time period amongst its primary demographic. As of May 2013, the program averages approximately 2 to 2.5 million viewers each week.

Regular Show received positive reviews from critics and has been noted for its appeal towards different age groups, simplistic animation style, and frequent references to 1980s popular culture. It has attained four Primetime Emmy Award nominations, including a win in the Short-format Animation category for the 2012 third season episode "Eggscellent". The series has also been nominated for two Annie Awards, as well as three BAFTA Children's Awards. The eighth and final season was announced by Cartoon Network on July 7, 2015. A film adaptation based on the series, titled Regular Show: The Movie, premiered on November 25, 2015. After eight seasons and 244 episodes, Regular Show concluded on January 16, 2017, with the 33-minute finale "A Regular Epic Final Battle".

On June 12, 2024, Warner Bros. Discovery announced that a new series featuring some characters from Regular Show had been greenlit, with Quintel returning as showrunner. The series was soon revealed to be titled Regular Show: The Lost Tapes and premiered worldwide on May 11, 2026.

== Series overview ==
=== Regular Show ===
Season	Episodes	Originally released	
Season	Episodes	First released	Last released
Precursors	2	August 24, 2005	May 11, 2006
Pilot		August 14, 2009	
1	12	September 6, 2010	November 22, 2010
2	28	November 29, 2010	August 1, 2011
3	39	September 19, 2011	September 3, 2012
4	37	October 1, 2012	August 12, 2013
5	37	September 2, 2013	August 14, 2014
6	28	October 9, 2014	June 25, 2015
7	36	June 26, 2015	June 30, 2016
Film		November 25, 2015	
8	27	September 26, 2016	January 16, 2017

=== Regular Show: The Lost Tapes ===
Season	Episodes	Originally released	
Season	Episodes	First released	Last released
1	40	May 11, 2026	TBA

== Early shorts (2005–06) ==
J. G. Quintel created two shorts while in college with characters that resemble the present cast.

No.	Title	Written and directed by	Original release date
1	"The Naive Man from Lolliland"	J. G. Quintel	January 1, 2005 (online); August 24, 2005 (TV)
Pops visits a restaurant in the United States for the first time but gets in a feud in the restaurant over paying in his region's currency, lollipops.
2	"2 in the AM PM"	J. G. Quintel	January 1, 2006 (online); May 11, 2006 (TV)
Two gas station workers have to work at two o'clock in the morning on Halloween. Still, one of them unwittingly drugs them both by eating candy laced with LSD, altering their appearances, and must change themselves back before someone sees them.

== Episodes ==
=== Pilot (2009) ===
Title	Animation direction by	Written and storyboarded by	Original release date
"The Pilot"	Robert Alvarez and Larry Leichliter	J. G. Quintel	June 9, 2009 (screening) August 14, 2009 (CartoonNetwork.com)
Mordecai and Rigby compete against each other over Pops' old chair by playing rock-paper-scissors, but it is revealed to be an evil game when they tie 100 times in a row, spawning a portal-absorbing monster intent on eating the sofa.

=== Season 1 (2010) ===
No. overall	No. in season	Title	Animation direction by	Written and storyboarded by	Original release date	Prod. code	U.S. viewers (millions)
1	1	"The Power"	Robert Alvarez and Brian Sheesley	J. G. Quintel	September 6, 2010	697–003	2.10
2	2	"Just Set Up the Chairs"	Robert Alvarez and Brian Sheesley	Sean Szeles and Shion Takeuchi	September 13, 2010	697–004	1.90
3	3	"Caffeinated Concert Tickets"	Robert Alvarez and Brian Sheesley	J. G. Quintel and Mike Roth	September 20, 2010	697–001	1.72
4	4	"Death Punchies"	Robert Alvarez and Brian Sheesley	J. G. Quintel, Mike Roth, and Jake Armstrong	September 27, 2010	697–007	1.98
5	5	"Free Cake"	Robert Alvarez and Brian Sheesley	Kat Morris and Paul Scarlata	October 4, 2010	697–011	2.10
6	6	"Meat Your Maker"	Robert Alvarez and Brian Sheesley	Sean Szeles and Shion Takeuchi	October 11, 2010	697–012	1.87
7	7	"Grilled Cheese Deluxe"	Robert Alvarez and Brian Sheesley	Sean Szeles and Shion Takeuchi	October 18, 2010	697–008	2.16
8	8	"The Unicorns Have Got to Go"	Robert Alvarez and Brian Sheesley	Kat Morris and Paul Scarlata	October 25, 2010	697–005	2.42
9	9	"Prank Callers"	Robert Alvarez and Brian Sheesley	J. G. Quintel, Mike Roth, and Kent Osborne	November 1, 2010	697–009	2.10
10	10	"Don"	Robert Alvarez and Brian Sheesley	Benton Connor, Kat Morris, and J. G. Quintel	November 8, 2010	697–006	2.09
11	11	"Rigby's Body"	Robert Alvarez and Brian Sheesley	J. G. Quintel and Mike Roth	November 15, 2010	697–002	1.93
12	12	"Mordecai and the Rigbys"	Robert Alvarez and Brian Sheesley	Sean Szeles and Shion Takeuchi	November 22, 2010	697–010	2.03

=== Season 2 (2010–11) ===
No. overall	No. in season	Title	Animation direction by	Written and storyboarded by	Original release date	Prod. code	U.S. viewers (millions)
13	1	"Ello Gov'nor"	Robert Alvarez	Sean Szeles and Shion Takeuchi	November 29, 2010	1004–014	2.07
14	2	"It's Time"	Robert Alvarez	Benton Connor and Calvin Wong	January 3, 2011	1004–015	N/A
15	3	"Appreciation Day"	Robert Alvarez	Kat Morris and Paul Scarlata	January 10, 2011	1004–013	1.72
16	4	"Peeps"	Robert Alvarez	Benton Connor and Calvin Wong	January 17, 2011	1004–019	N/A
17	5	"Dizzy"	Robert Alvarez	Sean Szeles and Shion Takeuchi	January 24, 2011	1004–018	2.10
18	6	"My Mom"	Robert Alvarez	Kat Morris	January 31, 2011	1004–017	1.83
19	7	"High Score"	Lindsey Pollard	Sean Szeles	February 7, 2011	1004–024	N/A
20	8	"Rage Against the TV"	Robert Alvarez	J. G. Quintel, Mike Roth, and John Infantino	February 14, 2011	1004–020	1.85
21	9	"Party Pete"	Robert Alvarez	Benton Connor and Calvin Wong	February 21, 2011	1004–025	1.72
22	10	"Brain Eraser"	Robert Alvarez	Kat Morris	February 25, 2011	1004–021	0.91
23	11	"Benson Be Gone"	Robert Alvarez	John Infantino	February 28, 2011	1004–016	1.87
24	12	"But I Have a Receipt"	Robert Alvarez	Kat Morris and Minty Lewis	March 7, 2011	1004–028	1.75
25	13	"This Is My Jam"	Robert Alvarez	Sean Szeles	March 28, 2011	1004–027	1.52
26	14	"Muscle Woman"	Robert Alvarez	Benton Connor and Calvin Wong	April 4, 2011	1004–029	1.42
27	15	"Temp Check"	Brian Sheesley	Benton Connor and Calvin Wong	April 11, 2011	1004–031	1.69
28	16	"Jinx"	Robert Alvarez and Brian Sheesley	Sean Szeles and Henry Yu	April 18, 2011	1004–032	1.70
29	17	"See You There"	Robert Alvarez and Brian Sheesley	J. G. Quintel	April 25, 2011	1004–022	1.74
30	18	"Do Me a Solid"	Robert Alvarez and Brian Sheesley	Kat Morris and Minty Lewis	May 2, 2011	1004–030	2.04
31	19	"Grave Sights"	Robert Alvarez and Brian Sheesley	Benton Connor and Calvin Wong	May 9, 2011	1004–035	1.93
32	20	"Really Real Wrestling"	Robert Alvarez and Brian Sheesley	Sean Szeles	May 16, 2011	1004–034	2.16
33	21	"Over the Top"	Robert Alvarez and Brian Sheesley	Benton Connor and Calvin Wong	May 23, 2011	1004–036	1.96
34	22	"The Night Owl"	Robert Alvarez and Brian Sheesley	Kat Morris and Minty Lewis	May 30, 2011	1004–033	2.11
35	23	"A Bunch of Baby Ducks"	Robert Alvarez and Brian Sheesley	Kat Morris and Minty Lewis	June 6, 2011	1004–037	2.33
36	24	"More Smarter"	Robert Alvarez and Brian Sheesley	Benton Connor and Calvin Wong	June 13, 2011	1004–039	2.19
37	25	"First Day"	Robert Alvarez	J. G. Quintel	July 11, 2011	1004–040	2.63
38	26	"Go Viral"	Robert Alvarez and Brian Sheesley	Benton Connor and Calvin Wong	July 18, 2011	1004–026	2.01
39	27	"Skunked"	Robert Alvarez and Brian Sheesley	J. G. Quintel and Sean Szeles	July 25, 2011	1004–023	2.14
40	28	"Karaoke Video"	Robert Alvarez	Sean Szeles and Dennis Messner	August 1, 2011	1004–038	2.26

=== Season 3 (2011–12) ===
No. overall	No. in season	Title	Animation direction by	Written and storyboarded by	Original release date	Prod. code	U.S. viewers (millions)
41	1	"Stick Hockey"	Robert Alvarez	Sean Szeles and Kat Morris	September 19, 2011	1009-041	2.00
42	2	"Bet to Be Blonde"	Robert Alvarez	Benton Connor and Calvin Wong	September 26, 2011	1009-042	1.99
43	3	"Skips Strikes"	Robert Alvarez	Benton Connor and Calvin Wong	October 3, 2011	1009-046	2.08
44	4	"Terror Tales of the Park" (Note: This is a half-hour episode.)	Robert Alvarez	J. G. Quintel ("Creepy Doll"), Andres Salaff and Ben Adams ("Death Metal Crash Pit"), Sean Szeles and Kat Morris ("In the House")	October 10, 2011	1009-044	1.97
44	4	"Terror Tales of the Park"	Robert Alvarez	J. G. Quintel ("Creepy Doll"), Andres Salaff and Ben Adams ("Death Metal Crash Pit"), Sean Szeles and Kat Morris ("In the House")	October 10, 2011	1009-045	1.97
45	5	"Camping Can Be Cool"	Robert Alvarez	Sean Szeles and Kat Morris	October 17, 2011	1009-048	2.05
46	6	"Slam Dunk"	Robert Alvarez	Andres Salaff and Ben Adams	October 24, 2011	1009-047	2.08
47	7	"Cool Bikes"	Robert Alvarez	Benton Connor and Calvin Wong	November 7, 2011	1009-050	1.83
48	8	"House Rules"	Robert Alvarez	John Infantino and Andres Salaff	November 14, 2011	1009-052	2.30
49	9	"Rap It Up"	Robert Alvarez	Sean Szeles and Kat Morris	November 21, 2011	1009-054	2.14
50	10	"Cruisin'"	Robert Alvarez	Benton Connor and Calvin Wong	November 28, 2011	1009-051	2.17
51	11	"Under the Hood"	Robert Alvarez	Andres Salaff and Toby Jones	December 12, 2011	1009-053	2.32
52	12	"Weekend at Benson's"	Robert Alvarez	Benton Connor and Hilary Florido	January 16, 2012	1009-056	1.99
53	13	"Fortune Cookie"	Robert Alvarez	Benton Connor, Calvin Wong, and Hilary Florido	January 23, 2012	1009-049	1.86
54	14	"Think Positive"	Robert Alvarez	Sean Szeles and Kat Morris	January 30, 2012	1009-058	2.48
55	15	"Skips vs. Technology"	Robert Alvarez	Calvin Wong and Toby Jones	February 6, 2012	1009-060	2.39
56	16	"Butt Dial"	Robert Alvarez	Sean Szeles and Kat Morris	February 13, 2012	1009-068	2.45
57	17	"Eggscellent"	Robert Alvarez	J. G. Quintel	February 27, 2012	1009-057	2.32
58	18	"Gut Model"	Robert Alvarez	Sean Szeles and Kat Morris	March 5, 2012	1009-062	2.18
59	19	"Video Game Wizards"	Robert Alvarez	Benton Connor and Hilary Florido	March 26, 2012	1009-065	2.08
60	20	"Big Winner"	Robert Alvarez	Benton Connor and Hilary Florido	April 2, 2012	1009-076	2.38
61	21	"The Best Burger in the World"	Robert Alvarez	Andres Salaff	April 9, 2012	1009-064	2.46
62	22	"Replaced"	Robert Alvarez	J. G. Quintel, Mike Roth, and John Infantino	April 16, 2012	1009-043	2.30
63	23	"Trash Boat"	Robert Alvarez	Benton Connor and Hilary Florido	April 23, 2012	1009-066	N/A
64	24	"Fists of Justice"	Robert Alvarez	Andres Salaff	April 30, 2012	1009-067	2.25
65	25	"Yes Dude Yes"	Robert Alvarez	Sean Szeles and Kat Morris	May 7, 2012	1009-070	2.12
66	26	"Busted Cart"	Robert Alvarez	Benton Connor and Hilary Florido	May 14, 2012	1009-055	2.26
67	27	"Dead at Eight"	Robert Alvarez	Calvin Wong and Toby Jones	May 28, 2012	1009-072	2.05
68	28	"Access Denied"	Robert Alvarez	Sean Szeles and Kat Morris	June 4, 2012	1009-074	2.59
69	29	"Muscle Mentor"	Robert Alvarez	Andres Salaff	June 11, 2012	1009-071	2.73
70	30	"Trucker Hall of Fame"	Robert Alvarez	Calvin Wong and Toby Jones	June 18, 2012	1009-061	2.92
71	31	"Out of Commission"	Robert Alvarez	Calvin Wong and Toby Jones	June 25, 2012	1009-059	2.48
72	32	"Fancy Restaurant"	Robert Alvarez	Calvin Wong and Toby Jones	July 16, 2012	1009-073	2.93
73	33	"Diary"	Robert Alvarez	Andres Salaff and Madeline Queripel	July 23, 2012	1009-075	2.63
74	34	"The Best VHS in the World"	Robert Alvarez	Calvin Wong and Toby Jones	July 30, 2012	1009-079	2.78
75	35	"Prankless"	Robert Alvarez	Benton Connor and Hilary Florido	August 6, 2012	1009-078	2.93
76	36	"Death Bear"	Robert Alvarez	Sean Szeles and Kat Morris	August 13, 2012	1009-077	2.80
77	37	"Fuzzy Dice"	Robert Alvarez	Andres Salaff and Madeline Queripel	August 20, 2012	1009-080	2.63
78	38	"Sugar Rush"	Robert Alvarez	Benton Connor and Hilary Florido	August 27, 2012	1009-069	2.70
79	39	"Bad Kiss"	Robert Alvarez	Sean Szeles and Kat Morris	September 3, 2012	1009-063	2.17

=== Season 4 (2012–13) ===
No. overall	No. in season	Title	Directed by	Written and storyboarded by	Original release date	Prod. code	U.S. viewers (millions)
80	1	"Exit 9B"	Robert Alvarez (animation)	Calvin Wong, Toby Jones, Andres Salaff, and Madeline Queripel	October 1, 2012	1012-081; 1012-082	3.05
81	2	"Starter Pack"	Robert Alvarez (animation)	Benton Connor and Hilary Florido	October 8, 2012	1012-088	1.86
82	3	"Terror Tales of the Park II"	Robert Alvarez (animation)	Benton Connor and Hilary Florido ("Payback"), Sean Szeles and Kat Morris ("Party Bus" and "Wallpaper Man")	October 15, 2012	1012-083; 1012-084	3.11
83	4	"Pie Contest"	Robert Alvarez (animation)	Sarah Oleksyk and Hellen Jo	October 22, 2012	1012-085	2.62
84	5	"150 Piece Kit"	Robert Alvarez (animation)	Calvin Wong and Toby Jones	October 29, 2012	1012-086	2.11
85	6	"Bald Spot"	Robert Alvarez (animation)	Andres Salaff and Madeline Queripel	November 12, 2012	1012-087	2.61
86	7	"Guy's Night"	Robert Alvarez (animation)	Sean Szeles and Kat Morris	November 19, 2012	1012-089	2.46
87	8	"One Pull Up"	Robert Alvarez (animation)	Sarah Oleksyk and Hellen Jo	November 26, 2012	1012-090	2.14
88	9	"The Christmas Special"	J. G. Quintel and Mike Roth; Robert Alvarez (animation)	Sean Szeles, Kat Morris, Benton Connor, and Hilary Florido	December 3, 2012	1012-093; 1012-094	2.71
89	10	"T.G.I. Tuesday"	Robert Alvarez (animation)	Calvin Wong and Toby Jones	January 7, 2013	1012-091	2.81
90	11	"Firework Run"	Robert Alvarez (animation)	Andres Salaff and Madeline Queripel	January 14, 2013	1012-092	2.24
91	12	"The Longest Weekend"	Robert Alvarez (animation)	Sarah Oleksyk and Hellen Jo	January 21, 2013	1012-095	2.51
92	13	"Sandwich of Death"	Robert Alvarez (animation)	Andres Salaff and Madeline Queripel	January 28, 2013	1012-097	2.54
93	14	"Ace Balthazar Lives"	Robert Alvarez (animation)	Benton Connor and Hilary Florido	February 4, 2013	1012-098	2.27
94	15	"Do or Diaper"	Robert Alvarez (animation)	Sean Szeles and Kat Morris	February 11, 2013	1012-099	2.67
95	16	"Quips"	Robert Alvarez (animation)	Sarah Oleksyk and Hellen Jo	February 18, 2013	1012-100	2.43
96	17	"Caveman"	Robert Alvarez (animation)	Calvin Wong and Toby Jones	February 25, 2013	1012-101	2.44
97	18	"That's My Television"	Robert Alvarez (animation)	Andres Salaff and Madeline Queripel	March 4, 2013	1012-102	2.40
98	19	"A Bunch of Full Grown Geese"	Robert Alvarez (animation)	Calvin Wong and Toby Jones	March 25, 2013	1012-096	2.58
99	20	"Fool Me Twice"	Robert Alvarez (animation)	Calvin Wong and Toby Jones	April 1, 2013	1012-116	2.14
100	21	"Limousine Lunchtime"	Robert Alvarez (animation)	Benton Connor and Hilary Florido	April 8, 2013	1012-103	2.35
101	22	"Picking Up Margaret"	Robert Alvarez (animation)	Sean Szeles and Kat Morris	April 15, 2013	1012-104	2.26
102	23	"K.I.L.I.T. Radio"	Robert Alvarez (animation)	Benton Connor and Sarah Oleksyk	April 22, 2013	1012-105	1.94
103	24	"Carter and Briggs"	Robert Alvarez (animation)	Calvin Wong and Toby Jones	May 6, 2013	1012-106	2.12
104	25	"Skips' Stress"	Robert Alvarez (animation)	Andres Salaff and Madeline Queripel	May 13, 2013	1012-107	2.08
105	26	"Cool Cubed"	Robert Alvarez (animation)	Benton Connor and Hilary Florido	May 20, 2013	1012-108	2.37
106	27	"Trailer Trashed"	Robert Alvarez (animation)	Calvin Wong and Kat Morris	May 27, 2013	1012-109	2.04
107	28	"Meteor Moves"	Robert Alvarez (animation)	Benton Connor and Sarah Oleksyk	June 10, 2013	1012-110	2.46
108	29	"Family BBQ"	Robert Alvarez (animation)	Benton Connor and Hilary Florido	June 17, 2013	1012-113	2.27
109	30	"The Last Laserdisc Player"	Robert Alvarez (animation)	Calvin Wong and Toby Jones	June 24, 2013	1012-111	2.25
110	31	"Country Club"	Robert Alvarez (animation)	Andres Salaff and Madeline Queripel	July 1, 2013	1012-112	2.51
111	32	"Blind Trust"	Robert Alvarez (animation)	Andres Salaff and Madeline Queripel	July 15, 2013	1012-117	2.47
112	33	"World's Best Boss"	Robert Alvarez (animation)	Kat Morris and James Kim	July 15, 2013	1012-114	2.47
113	34	"Last Meal"	Robert Alvarez (animation)	Sarah Oleksyk and Owen Dennis	July 22, 2013	1012-115	2.55
114	35	"Sleep Fighter"	Robert Alvarez (animation)	Kat Morris and James Kim	July 29, 2013	1012-119	2.06
115	36	"Party Re-Pete"	Robert Alvarez (animation)	Sarah Oleksyk and Owen Dennis	August 5, 2013	1012-120	2.88
116	37	"Steak Me Amadeus"	Robert Alvarez (animation)	Benton Connor and Hilary Florido	August 12, 2013	1012-118	2.44

=== Season 5 (2013–14) ===
No. overall	No. in season	Title	Directed by	Written and storyboarded by	Original release date	Prod. code	U.S. viewers (millions)
117	1	"Laundry Woes"	Robert Alvarez (animation)	Hilary Florido and Madeline Queripel	September 2, 2013	1017-123	2.12
118	2	"Silver Dude"	Robert Alvarez (animation)	Sarah Oleksyk and Owen Dennis	September 2, 2013	1017-130	2.12
119	3	"Benson's Car"	Robert Alvarez (animation)	Calvin Wong and Minty Lewis	September 9, 2013	1017-124	2.10
120	4	"Every Meat Burritos"	Robert Alvarez (animation)	Owen Dennis and Sarah Oleksyk	September 16, 2013	1017-125	2.46
121	5	"Wall Buddy"	Robert Alvarez (animation)	Calvin Wong and Minty Lewis	September 23, 2013	1017-129	2.12
122	6	"A Skips in Time"	Robert Alvarez (animation)	Calvin Wong and Toby Jones	September 30, 2013	1017-131	1.94
123	7	"Survival Skills"	Robert Alvarez (animation)	Minty Lewis	October 14, 2013	1017-134	1.87
124	8	"Terror Tales of the Park III"	Robert Alvarez (animation)	Calvin Wong and Toby Jones, Benton Connor and Andres Salaff ("The Previous Owner" only)	October 21, 2013	1017-121; 1017-122	2.29
125	9	"Tants"	Robert Alvarez (animation)	Hilary Florido and Madeline Queripel	November 4, 2013	1017-133	2.07
126	10	"Bank Shot"	Robert Alvarez (animation)	Owen Dennis and Sarah Oleksyk	November 11, 2013	1017-135	1.99
127	11	"Power Tower"	Robert Alvarez (animation)	Benton Connor and Andres Salaff	November 18, 2013	1017-136	2.09
128	12	"The Thanksgiving Special"	J. G. Quintel and Mike Roth; Robert Alvarez (animation)	Calvin Wong, Toby Jones, Benton Connor, and Andres Salaff	November 25, 2013	1017-126; 1017-127	3.04
129	13	"The Heart of a Stuntman"	Robert Alvarez (animation)	Calvin Wong and Minty Lewis	December 2, 2013	1017-137	2.03
130	14	"New Year's Kiss"	Robert Alvarez (animation)	Hilary Florido and Madeline Queripel	December 31, 2013	1017-128	1.84
131	15	"Dodge This"	Robert Alvarez (animation)	Benton Connor and Andres Salaff	January 13, 2014	1017-132	2.05
132	16	"Portable Toilet"	Robert Alvarez (animation)	Toby Jones and Owen Dennis	January 27, 2014	1017-138	1.89
133	17	"The Postcard"	Robert Alvarez (animation)	Hilary Florido and Madeline Queripel	February 10, 2014	1017-144	1.89
134	18	"Rigby in the Sky with Burrito"	Robert Alvarez (animation)	Hilary Florido and Madeline Queripel	February 24, 2014	1017-139	1.85
135	19	"Journey to the Bottom of the Crash Pit"	Robert Alvarez (animation)	Benton Connor and Sarah Oleksyk	March 3, 2014	1017-140	1.48
136	20	"Saving Time"	Robert Alvarez (animation)	Andres Salaff and Ryan Pequin	March 10, 2014	1017-146	1.86
137	21	"Guitar of Rock"	Robert Alvarez (animation)	Andres Salaff and Ryan Pequin	March 17, 2014	1017-141	2.05
138	22	"Skips' Story"	Robert Alvarez (animation)	Calvin Wong and Minty Lewis	April 14, 2014	1017-147; 1017-152	2.72
139	23	"Return of Mordecai and the Rigbys"	Robert Alvarez (animation)	Calvin Wong and Minty Lewis	April 21, 2014	1017-142	2.67
140	24	"Bad Portrait"	Robert Alvarez (animation)	Owen Dennis and Toby Jones	April 28, 2014	1017-143	1.96
141	25	"Video 101"	Robert Alvarez (animation)	Benton Connor and Sarah Oleksyk	May 5, 2014	1017-145	2.14
142	26	"I Like You Hi"	Robert Alvarez (animation)	Toby Jones and Owen Dennis	May 12, 2014	1017-148	N/A
143	27	"Play Date"	Robert Alvarez (animation)	Hilary Florido and Madeline Queripel	June 5, 2014	1017-149	2.12
144	28	"Expert or Liar"	Robert Alvarez (animation)	Benton Connor and Sarah Oleksyk	June 12, 2014	1017-150	1.73
145	29	"Catching the Wave"	Robert Alvarez (animation)	Calvin Wong and Minty Lewis	June 19, 2014	1017-157	1.86
146	30	"Gold Watch"	Robert Alvarez (animation)	Andres Salaff and Ryan Pequin	June 26, 2014	1017-151	2.11
147	31	"Paint Job"	Robert Alvarez (animation)	Toby Jones and Owen Dennis	July 3, 2014	1017-153	1.90
148	32	"Take the Cake"	Robert Alvarez (animation)	Hilary Florido and Madeline Queripel	July 10, 2014	1017-154	2.18
149	33	"Skips in the Saddle"	Robert Alvarez (animation)	Benton Connor and Sarah Oleksyk	July 17, 2014	1017-155	1.68
150	34	"Thomas Fights Back"	Robert Alvarez (animation)	Andres Salaff and Ryan Pequin	July 24, 2014	1017-156	2.00
151	35	"Bachelor Party! Zingo!!"	Robert Alvarez (animation)	Toby Jones and Owen Dennis	July 31, 2014	1017-159	1.89
152	36	"Tent Trouble"	Robert Alvarez (animation)	Hilary Florido and Madeline Queripel	August 7, 2014	1017-160	1.79
153	37	"Real Date"	Robert Alvarez (animation)	Calvin Wong and Minty Lewis	August 14, 2014	1017-158	1.85

=== Season 6 (2014–15) ===
No. overall	No. in season	Title	Directed by	Written and storyboarded by	Original release date	Prod. code	U.S. viewers (millions)
154	1	"Maxin' and Relaxin'"	Robert Alvarez (animation)	Calvin Wong and Ryan Pequin	October 9, 2014	1029–163	2.19
155	2	"New Bro on Campus"	Robert Alvarez (animation)	Benton Connor and Madeline Queripel	October 16, 2014	1029–164	2.24
156	3	"Daddy Issues"	Robert Alvarez (animation)	Benton Connor and Sarah Oleksyk	October 23, 2014	1029–165	1.71
157	4	"Terror Tales of the Park IV"	Robert Alvarez (animation)	Toby Jones and Owen Dennis, Sarah Oleksyk and Minty Lewis ("Scary Movie Night" only)	October 29, 2014	1029–161	1.74
157	4	"Terror Tales of the Park IV"	Robert Alvarez (animation)	Toby Jones and Owen Dennis, Sarah Oleksyk and Minty Lewis ("Scary Movie Night" only)	October 29, 2014	1029–162	1.74
158	5	"The End of Muscle Man"	Robert Alvarez (animation)	Minty Lewis and Sarah Oleksyk	October 30, 2014	1029–167	1.38
159	6	"Lift with Your Back"	Robert Alvarez (animation)	Toby Jones and Owen Dennis	November 6, 2014	1029–166	1.71
160	7	"Eileen Flat Screen"	Robert Alvarez (animation)	Minty Lewis and Sarah Oleksyk	November 13, 2014	1029–172	1.60
161	8	"The Real Thomas"	J. G. Quintel; Robert Alvarez (animation)	Calvin Wong and Ryan Pequin	November 20, 2014	1029–169	1.71
161	8	"The Real Thomas"	J. G. Quintel; Robert Alvarez (animation)	Calvin Wong and Ryan Pequin	November 20, 2014	1029–170	1.71
162	9	"The White Elephant Gift Exchange"	Robert Alvarez (animation)	Benton Connor and Madeline Queripel	December 4, 2014	1029–168	2.12
163	10	"Merry Christmas Mordecai"	Robert Alvarez (animation)	Benton Connor and Madeline Queripel	December 4, 2014	1029–173	2.12
164	11	"Sad Sax"	Robert Alvarez (animation)	Ryan Pequin	January 8, 2015	1029–175	1.85
165	12	"Park Managers' Lunch"	Robert Alvarez (animation)	Toby Jones and Owen Dennis	January 15, 2015	1029–171	1.84
166	13	"Mordecai and Rigby Down Under"	Robert Alvarez (animation)	Calvin Wong and Casey Crowe	January 22, 2015	1029–174	1.88
167	14	"Married and Broke"	Robert Alvarez (animation)	Toby Jones and Owen Dennis	January 29, 2015	1029–176	1.80
168	15	"I See Turtles"	Robert Alvarez (animation)	Benton Connor and Madeline Queripel	February 5, 2015	1029–178	1.72
169	16	"Format Wars II"	Robert Alvarez (animation)	Calvin Wong and Casey Crowe	February 12, 2015	1029–179	1.67
170	17	"Happy Birthday Song Contest"	Robert Alvarez (animation)	Minty Lewis and Sarah Oleksyk	February 19, 2015	1029–177	2.08
171	18	"Benson's Suit"	Robert Alvarez (animation)	Ryan Pequin	February 26, 2015	1029–180	1.86
172	19	"Gamers Never Say Die"	Robert Alvarez (animation)	Toby Jones and Owen Dennis	March 5, 2015	1029–181	1.73
173	20	"1000th Chopper Flight Party"	Robert Alvarez (animation)	Minty Lewis	March 12, 2015	1029–182	1.66
174	21	"Party Horse"	Robert Alvarez (animation)	Benton Connor and Madeline Queripel	March 19, 2015	1029–183	1.49
175	22	"Men in Uniform"	Robert Alvarez (animation)	Calvin Wong and Casey Crowe	March 26, 2015	1029–184	1.95
176	23	"Garage Door"	Robert Alvarez (animation)	Benton Connor and Madeline Queripel	April 2, 2015	1029–188	1.63
177	24	"Brilliant Century Duck Crisis Special"	Robert Alvarez (animation)	Toby Jones and Owen Dennis	April 9, 2015	1029–190	1.99
177	24	"Brilliant Century Duck Crisis Special"	Robert Alvarez (animation)	Toby Jones and Owen Dennis	April 9, 2015	1029–192	1.99
178	25	"Not Great Double Date"	Robert Alvarez (animation)	Toby Jones and Owen Dennis	June 22, 2015	1029–186	1.66
179	26	"Death Kwon Do-Livery"	Robert Alvarez (animation)	Calvin Wong and Casey Crowe	June 23, 2015	1029–189	1.70
180	27	"Lunch Break"	Robert Alvarez (animation)	Minty Lewis and Ryan Pequin	June 24, 2015	1029–191	1.60
181	28	"Dumped at the Altar"	Robert Alvarez (animation)	Minty Lewis and Ryan Pequin	June 25, 2015	1029–187	1.59

=== Season 7 (2015–16) ===
No. overall	No. in season	Title	Animation direction by	Written and storyboarded by	Original release date	Prod. code	U.S. viewers (millions)
182	1	"Dumptown U.S.A."	Robert Alvarez	Benton Connor and Sam Spina	June 26, 2015	1035-195	1.29
183	2	"The Parkie Awards"	Robert Alvarez	Madeline Queripel and Alex Cline	August 6, 2015	1035-196	1.60
184	3	"The Lunch Club"	Robert Alvarez	Calvin Wong and Casey Crowe	August 13, 2015	1035-197	1.55
185	4	"Local News Legend"	Robert Alvarez	Madeline Queripel and Alex Cline	August 20, 2015	1035-200	1.49
186	5	"The Dome Experiment Special"	Robert Alvarez	Toby Jones, Owen Dennis, Minty Lewis, and Ryan Pequin	August 27, 2015	1035-198; 1035-199	1.60
187	6	"Birthday Gift"	Robert Alvarez	Benton Connor and Sam Spina	September 3, 2015	1035-201	1.43
188	7	"Cat Videos"	Robert Alvarez	Calvin Wong and Casey Crowe	September 10, 2015	1035-202	1.31
189	8	"Struck by Lightning"	Robert Alvarez	Toby Jones and Owen Dennis	September 17, 2015	1035-203	1.39
190	9	"Terror Tales of the Park V"	Robert Alvarez	Toby Jones, Owen Dennis, Ryan Pequin, and Minty Lewis	October 29, 2015	1035-193; 1035-194	1.31
191	10	"The Return of Party Horse"	Robert Alvarez	Minty Lewis and Ryan Pequin	November 9, 2015	1035-204	1.03
192	11	"Sleep Cycle"	Robert Alvarez	Madeline Queripel and Alex Cline	November 10, 2015	1035-205	1.32
193	12	"Just Friends"	Robert Alvarez	Calvin Wong and Casey Crowe	November 11, 2015	1035-206	1.26
194	13	"Benson's Pig"	Robert Alvarez	Benton Connor and Sam Spina	November 12, 2015	1035-207	1.16
195	14	"The Eileen Plan"	Robert Alvarez	Minty Lewis and Ryan Pequin	November 13, 2015	1035-209	1.13
196	15	"Hello China"	Robert Alvarez	Toby Jones and Owen Dennis	November 30, 2015	1035-208	1.25
197	16	"Crazy Fake Plan"	Robert Alvarez	Madeline Queripel and Alex Cline	December 1, 2015	1035-211	1.25
198	17	"Win That Prize"	Robert Alvarez	Calvin Wong and Casey Crowe	December 2, 2015	1035-212	1.16
199	18	"Snow Tubing"	Robert Alvarez	Benton Connor and Sam Spina	December 3, 2015	1035-210	1.18
200	19	"Chili Cook Off"	Robert Alvarez	Toby Jones and Owen Dennis	March 5, 2016	1035-213	1.08
201	20	"Donut Factory Holiday"	Robert Alvarez	Ryan Pequin and Nathan Bulmer	March 12, 2016 (Note: This episode was first released online on February 6, 2016.)	1035-214	1.02
202	21	"Gymblonski"	Robert Alvarez	Benton Connor and Sam Spina	March 19, 2016 (Note: This episode was first released online on February 13, 2016.)	1035-215	1.17
203	22	"Guys Night 2"	Robert Alvarez	Madeline Queripel and Alex Cline	March 26, 2016 (Note: This episode was first released online on February 20, 2016.)	1035-216	1.00
204	23	"Gary's Synthesizer"	Robert Alvarez	Owen Dennis and Casey Crowe	April 2, 2016 (Note: This episode was first released online on February 27, 2016.)	1035-217	1.00
205	24	"California King"	Robert Alvarez	Ryan Pequin	April 9, 2016	1035-219	1.10
206	25	"Cube Bros"	Robert Alvarez	Benton Connor and Sam Spina	April 16, 2016	1035-220	0.79
207	26	"Maellard's Package"	Robert Alvarez	Madeline Queripel and Alex Cline	April 23, 2016	1035-221	0.94
208	27	"Rigby Goes to the Prom"	Robert Alvarez	Toby Jones and Owen Dennis	May 5, 2016	1035-218	1.02
209	28	"The Button"	Robert Alvarez	Toby Jones and Owen Dennis	May 12, 2016 (Note: This episode was first released on iTunes on May 2, 2016.)	1035-223	1.40
210	29	"Favorite Shirt"	Robert Alvarez	Ryan Pequin	May 19, 2016	1035-224	1.17
211	30	"Marvolo the Wizard"	Robert Alvarez	Benton Connor and Sam Spina	May 26, 2016	1035-225	1.35
212	31	"Pops' Favorite Planet"	Robert Alvarez	Madeline Queripel and Alex Cline	June 2, 2016	1035-226	1.25
213	32	"Pam I Am"	Robert Alvarez	Casey Crowe and Gideon Chase	June 2, 2016	1035-227	1.25
214	33	"Lame Lockdown"	Robert Alvarez	Benton Connor and Sam Spina	June 9, 2016	1035-230	1.02
215	34	"VIP Members Only"	Robert Alvarez	Madeline Queripel and Alex Cline	June 16, 2016	1035-231	0.98
216	35	"Deez Keys"	Robert Alvarez	Casey Crowe and Gideon Chase	June 23, 2016	1035-232	1.18
217	36	"Rigby's Graduation Day Special"	Robert Alvarez	Toby Jones, Owen Dennis, Ryan Pequin, and Minty Lewis	June 30, 2016	1035-228; 1035-229	1.10

=== Season 8 (2016–17) ===
No. overall	No. in season	Title	Animation direction by	Written and storyboarded by	Original release date	Prod. code	U.S. viewers (millions)
218	1	"One Space Day at a Time"	Robert Alvarez	Owen Dennis and Sean Glaze	September 26, 2016	1043-234	1.14
219	2	"Cool Bro Bots"	Robert Alvarez	Benton Connor and Sam Spina	September 26, 2016	1043-235	1.14
220	3	"Welcome to Space"	Robert Alvarez	Madeline Queripel and Alex Cline	September 27, 2016	1043-236	0.96
221	4	"Space Creds"	Robert Alvarez	Casey Crowe and Gideon Chase	September 27, 2016	1043-237	0.96
222	5	"Lost and Found"	Robert Alvarez	Minty Lewis and Ryan Pequin	September 28, 2016	1043-239	0.96
223	6	"Ugly Moons"	Robert Alvarez	Benton Connor and Sam Spina	September 29, 2016	1043-240	0.98
224	7	"The Dream Warrior"	Robert Alvarez	Madeline Queripel and Alex Cline	September 30, 2016	1043-241	1.09
225	8	"The Brain of Evil"	Robert Alvarez	Owen Dennis and Sean Glaze	October 3, 2016	1043-238	0.82
226	9	"Fries Night"	Robert Alvarez	Casey Crowe and Gideon Chase	October 4, 2016	1043-242	0.95
227	10	"Spacey McSpaceTree"	Robert Alvarez and Brian Sheesley	Benton Connor and Sam Spina	October 5, 2016	1043-243	1.04
228	11	"Can You Ear Me Now?"	Robert Alvarez and Brian Sheesley	Madeline Queripel and Alex Cline	October 6, 2016	1043-246	0.92
229	12	"Stuck in an Elevator"	Robert Alvarez and Brian Sheesley	Casey Crowe and Gideon Chase	October 7, 2016	1043-247	0.95
230	13	"The Space Race"	Robert Alvarez	Owen Dennis and Sean Glaze	October 10, 2016	1043-248	0.93
231	14	"Operation Hear No Evil"	Robert Alvarez	Minty Lewis and Ryan Pequin	October 11, 2016	1043-249	0.91
232	15	"Space Escape"	Robert Alvarez	Benton Connor and Sam Spina	October 12, 2016	1043-250	0.84
233	16	"New Beds"	Robert Alvarez	Madeline Queripel and Alex Cline	October 13, 2016	1043-251	1.15
234	17	"Mordeby and Rigbecai"	Robert Alvarez	Casey Crowe and Gideon Chase	October 14, 2016	1043-252	0.88
235	18	"Alpha Dome"	Brian Sheesley and Robert Alvarez	Owen Dennis and Sean Glaze	October 20, 2016	1043-253	0.99
236	19	"Terror Tales of the Park VI"	Robert Alvarez and Brian Sheesley	Sean Glaze ("Fear Planet"), Owen Dennis ("King-Sized Candy Bars"), Minty Lewis and Ryan Pequin ("Alien Roommate")	October 27, 2016 (Note: This episode was first released online on October 15, 2016.)	1043-244; 1043-245	1.05
237	20	"The Ice Tape"	Robert Alvarez	Madeline Queripel and Alex Cline	November 3, 2016	1043-256	0.92
238	21	"The Key to the Universe"	Robert Alvarez	Casey Crowe and Gideon Chase	November 10, 2016	1043-257	1.02
239	22	"No Train No Gain"	Robert Alvarez	Owen Dennis and Sean Glaze	November 17, 2016	1043-258	0.99
240	23	"Christmas in Space"	Robert Alvarez and Brian Sheesley	Minty Lewis, Ryan Pequin, Benton Connor, and Sam Spina	December 1, 2016	1043-254A; 1043-254B	0.92
241	24	"Kill 'Em with Kindness"	Robert Alvarez and Jeff Hall	Minty Lewis and Ryan Pequin	January 14, 2017 (Note: This episode was first released online on December 19, 2016.)	1043-259	1.08
242	25	"Meet the Seer"	Robert Alvarez and Jeff Hall	Benton Connor and Sam Spina	January 14, 2017 (Note: This episode was first released online on December 19, 2016.)	1043-260	1.08
243	26	"Cheer Up Pops"	Robert Alvarez and Jeff Hall	Casey Crowe and Gideon Chase	January 16, 2017	1043-261	1.33
244	27	"A Regular Epic Final Battle" (Note: This is a special extended 33-minute episode.)	Robert Alvarez, Richard Collado and Jeff Hall	Minty Lewis, Ryan Pequin, Andres Salaff, Benton Connor, Owen Dennis, Alex Cline, Madeline Queripel, and Sam Spina	January 16, 2017	1043-262; 1043-264A; 1043-264B	1.37

=== Regular Show: The Lost Tapes (2026) ===
No.	Title	Written and storyboarded by	Story by	Original release date	Prod. code	U.S. viewers (millions)
1	"Fix That Tape" (Note: Afterlife episode)	Written by : J. G. Quintel, Sean Szeles, Toby Jones, and Calvin Wong; Storyboarded by : Siti Lu and Calvin Wong	Matt Price	May 11, 2026	324	0.20
2	"Skips' Luau"	Maddie Brewer and Ryan Pequin	Minty Lewis	May 11, 2026	321	0.20
3	"Blade Games"	Sam Lane and Bryan Mann	Minty Lewis	May 12, 2026 (Note: This episode first premiered on HBO Max internationally on May 11, 2026, ahead of its official air date.)	323	0.17
4	"Nap Spot"	Alex Cline and Monty Ray	Michele Cavin and Matt Price	May 13, 2026	322	0.08
5	"Coffee Shop Wars"	Maddie Brewer and Ryan Pequin	Michele Cavin	May 14, 2026	325	0.08
6	"Boba or Bo-Bust"	Alex Cline and Monty Ray	Minty Lewis	May 18, 2026	326	0.16
7	"Corpse Flower"	Monty Ray and Alex Cline	Minty Lewis	May 19, 2026 (Note: This episode first premiered on HBO Max internationally on May 18, 2026, ahead of its official air date.)	330	0.12
8	"Beginson"	Hilary Florido and Madeline Queripel	Michele Cavin	May 20, 2026	328	0.10
9	"Good Mitch Spiking"	Sam Lane and Bryan Mann	Michele Cavin	May 21, 2026	335	0.12
10	"Stilt Walkers"	Maddie Brewer and Ryan Pequin	Matt Price	May 22, 2026	329	0.21
11	"Spice It Up"	Maddie Brewer and Ryan Pequin	Minty Lewis	September 19, 2026 (Note: This episode premiered on HBO Max internationally and YouTube on September 7, 2026, ahead of its official air date.)	337	N/A
12	"Secret Menu Item"	Sam Lane and Bryan Mann	Matt Price	September 26, 2026 (Note: This episode premiered on HBO Max internationally on September 7, 2026, ahead of its official air date.)	327	N/A
13	"Terror Tales of the Park VII" (Note: While the episode mainly takes place in the afterlife, the stories featured in it are presented as video tapes.)	Hilary Florido and Madeline Queripel ("Y.A.M." and "Killer Workout"), Maddie Brewer and Ryan Pequin ("Feedback Goop")	Matt Price, Michele Cavin and Minty Lewis	October 3, 2026	340	N/A
13	"Terror Tales of the Park VII"	Hilary Florido and Madeline Queripel ("Y.A.M." and "Killer Workout"), Maddie Brewer and Ryan Pequin ("Feedback Goop")	Matt Price, Michele Cavin and Minty Lewis	October 3, 2026	341	N/A
14	"Smoke Alarm on the Water"	Sam Lane and Bryan Mann	Matt Price	October 10, 2026 (Note: This episode first premiered on HBO Max internationally on September 14, 2026, ahead of its official air date.)	331	TBD
15	"Party Horse 4: Third Time's a Charm"	Maddie Brewer and Ryan Pequin	Matt Price	October 17, 2026	333	TBD
16	"Clean the Living Room"	Owen Dennis and Monty Ray	Matt Price	October 24, 2026	334	TBD
17	"Artist's Block"	Hilary Florido, Madeline Queripel, J. G. Quintel and Sean Szeles	Michele Cavin	October 31, 2026 (Note: This episode was accidentally added to Hulu and Disney+ via a bundle subscription prematurely on May 28, 2026. It would later be taken down hours later.)	332	TBD
18	"That's Funny"	Owen Dennis and Monty Ray	Michele Cavin	November 7, 2026	338	TBD
19	"Cool Boss"	Sam Lane and Bryan Mann	Minty Lewis	November 14, 2026	339	TBD
20	"Skips' Van"	Owen Dennis and Monty Ray	TBA	2027	342	TBD
21	"Super Strong Johns"	TBD	TBA	2027	343	TBD
22	"Car Wash"	TBD	TBA	2027	336	TBD
23	"All You Can Fit"	Hilary Florido and Madeline Queripel	Matt Price	2027	344	TBD
24	"Don's Back"	TBD	TBA	2027	TBA	TBD
25	"Life & Death of Robot Dog"	TBD	TBA	2027	TBA	TBD
26	"Before Sunrise"	TBD	TBA	2027	TBA	TBD
27	"Recycle Yo!"	TBD	TBA	2027	TBA	TBD
28	"Hi Five's Throat"	TBD	TBA	2027	TBA	TBD
29	"Carter & Briggs Are Here"	TBD	TBA	2027	TBA	TBD
30	"Wet Phone"	TBA	TBA	TBA	TBA	TBD
31	"Dip Deep"	TBA	TBA	TBA	TBA	TBD
32	"Ketch of the Day"	TBA	TBA	TBA	TBA	TBD
33	"Thanks for the Memories"	TBA	TBA	TBA	TBA	TBD
34	"Master Curator"	TBA	TBA	TBA	TBA	TBD
35	"12,000 Seconds"	TBA	TBA	TBA	TBA	TBD
36	"The Afterheist"	TBA	TBA	TBA	TBA	TBD
37	"Japlan"	TBA	TBA	TBA	TBA	TBD
38	"The Ultimate Format War"	TBA	TBA	TBA	TBA	TBD
38	"The Ultimate Format War"	TBA	TBA	TBA	TBA	TBD

== Film ==
Title	Directed by	Written and storyboarded by	Original release date	Prod. code	US viewers (millions)
Regular Show: The Movie	J. G. Quintel; Robert Alvarez and Brian Sheesley (animation)	Sean Szeles, J.G. Quintel, Calvin Wong, Andres Salaff, Mike Roth, Benton Connor, John Infantino, Owen Dennis, and Toby Jones	November 25, 2015	1043-000	2.17
In the near distant future, Mordecai and Rigby are now against each other after a mistake Rigby made in the past. When present Mordecai and Rigby learn about this, they try to right the wrongs and save their friendship and the universe, but things are not as easy for them with the Timenado they accidentally created in high school destroying the fabric of space and time, and their old revenge-seeking volleyball coach Mr. Ross on their tails. Note: The events of the film take place between the first two episodes of season seven, "Dumptown U.S.A." and "The Parkie Awards".

== Shorts ==
=== Season 2 short ===
Title	Written and storyboarded by	Original release date
"Ringtoneers"	J. G. Quintel	April 15, 2011
Mordecai and Rigby want to prove that they can make a really cool ringtone.

=== Season 6 shorts ===
These shorts' production code takes up one production code of season 6.

No.	Title	Written and storyboarded by	Original release date	Prod. code
1	"USA! USA!"	Ryan Pequin and Owen Dennis	July 6, 2015	1029-185B
To show their knowledge of other countries to Benson, Mordecai and Rigby rap about every country they know about.
2	"Fun Run"	Sarah Oleksyk	September 1, 2015	1029-185A
Pops goes on a fun run across the country. Featured Song: I Ran (So Far Away) by A Flock of Seagulls
3	"OOOHH!!!"	Ryan Pequin	October 1, 2015	1029-185C
Mordecai and Rigby tour the world doing their "OOOHH!!!" celebration.
4	"Break Time"	Madeline Queripel	October 8, 2015	1029-185D
Mordecai, Rigby, Muscle Man, and Hi-Five Ghost ask Benson for a break, and he responds by giving them a break.

=== Season 7 shorts ===
These shorts' production code takes up one production code of season 7.

No.	Title	Written and storyboarded by	Original release date	Prod. code
1	"Ninja Shoes"	Madeline Queripel	March 26, 2016	1035-222A
Mordecai and Rigby try to sneak out of the house wearing Ninja Shoes.
2	"Coming Soon"	Toby Jones	April 2, 2016	1035-222B
Mordecai and Rigby mimic the Movie Trailer voices.
3	"Sick Day"	Owen Dennis	April 9, 2016	1035-222C
Mordecai and Rigby decide to slide into a sick day.
4	"Pizza Pouch Drop"	Owen Dennis	April 16, 2016	1035-222D
Mordecai and Rigby strive to make the ultimate Pizza Pouch.
5	"The 1973 Tetherball Championship Trophy"	Toby Jones	April 23, 2016	1035-222E
In a spoof of Wes Anderson films, Mordecai and Rigby try to win a vintage tetherball championship trophy.

=== Season 8 shorts ===
These shorts' production code take up one production code of season 8.

No.	Title	Written and storyboarded by	Original release date	Prod. code
1	"2001: A Nap Odyssey"	Ryan Pequin	September 23, 2016	1043-233A
The guys take a nap in zero gravity.
2	"Time Loop"	Minty Lewis	December 19, 2016	1043-233E
The guys get stuck in a time loop.
3	"Synth Buttons"	Owen Dennis	December 23, 2016	1043-233D
Mordecai and Rigby realize that the bridge of the ship is also a synthesizer.
4	"Robot Rap Battle"	Minty Lewis	December 26, 2016	1043-233B
Mordecai and Rigby participate in the 10th Annual Robot Rap Battle.
5	"Space Worm"	Minty Lewis	January 2, 2017	1043-233C
Mordecai and Rigby ride a needy space worm.
