= C. Lee Kenagy Park =

Park in Raytown, Missouri

- Interactive map of C. Lee Kenagy Park
- Type: Public Park
- Location: Raytown, Missouri
- Coordinates: 38.980429°N 94.467831°W
- Area: 18-acre (7.3 ha)

C. Lee Kenagy Park, also known as just Kenagy Park, is a City Park located in Raytown, Missouri, US. This 18-acre (73,000 m^{2}) multi-purpose park can be found at 79th Street and Raytown Road. It includes many park amenities, and is often visited by Raytown locals. Recent renovations include a larger parking lot, a new playground, a soda machine, and a new entrance.

== Park amenities ==
The park is very well equipped, and includes: six shelters, four lighted tennis courts, a Baseball field, and a .44-mile-long (0.71 km) walking track surrounding a Fishing pond. Also included are three playgrounds, and two enclosed restrooms. The most distinctive feature in this park may just be the skatepark, located on the southwest corner of the park.

== Skatepark ==
A view of Kenegy Skatepark from atop the smaller roll-in ramp, looking south.

The skatepark can date back to 2005, and was Raytown's first, and currently only, skatepark. It was built by American Ramp Company, based out of Joplin, Missouri. The park itself is constructed entirely of steel, atop a smooth surface concrete base. The park is mainly geared towards "vert" skateboarding, with two large quarter pipes, one five foot, and another six foot. Across from each quarter pipe is an equal sized roll-in ramp. The park also includes a pyramid with an attached four-stair and rail, and a smaller three-and-a-half foot tall spine.

The park is not entirely in favor of ramps, there is also a descending square rail in the corner, away from the ramps, and easily accessible. Also on the opposite side there is a foot-high box, and a two-foot-high box attached to each other, for grinding and manual tricks. The park's set-up is hard to argue with, despite its flaws the park is very easy to get around. Some skateboarders complain that metal ramps effect performance, this is not true however. The only down-side, other than loud noise, is when the weather becomes hot, so do the ramps.

The city is very serious about the skatepark, some call it "Raytown's test park", because they think if it works with the youth then a second, better skatepark may be in the near future. The park shows no signs of graffiti, and litter has been down to a minimum. After over two years, Raytown should be considering a new skatepark to put themselves in the skatepark scene.
