= Regular Show =

American animated sitcom

- Also known as: Regular Show in Space (S8)
- Genre: Action adventure; Animated sitcom; Black comedy; Comedy-drama; Science fantasy; Surreal comedy
- Created by: J. G. Quintel
- Showrunner: J. G. Quintel
- Creative directors: Mike Roth; John Infantino
- Voices of: J. G. Quintel; William Salyers; Sam Marin; Mark Hamill; Minty Lewis
- Theme music composer: J. G. Quintel
- Composers: Mark Mothersbaugh; John Enroth; Albert Fox
- Country of origin: United States
- Original language: English
- No. of seasons: 8
- No. of episodes: 244 (Note: 15 additional shorts (i.e., mini-episodes roughly two minutes in length) were also produced.) (list of episodes)

Production
- Executive producers: J. G. Quintel; Curtis Lelash; Jennifer Pelphrey; Brian A. Miller; Rob Sorcher
- Producers: Janet Dimon; Ryan Slater
- Running time: 11–33 minutes
- Production company: Cartoon Network Studios

Original release
- Network: Cartoon Network
- Release: September 6, 2010 – January 16, 2017

Related
- Regular Show: The Movie; Regular Show: The Lost Tapes; Close Enough

Regular Show (Note: Known as Regular Show in Space during its eighth season) is an American animated sitcom created by J. G. Quintel for Cartoon Network. It ran from September 6, 2010, to January 16, 2017, over the course of eight seasons and 244 episodes.

The series follows the daily lives of two 23-year-old friends—Mordecai, a blue jay, and Rigby, a raccoon—who work at a local park as groundskeepers. Their coworkers are Skips, an immortal yeti, Muscle Man, a green-skinned overweight man, and Hi-Five Ghost, a small ghost. Other characters include Pops, the lollipop-shaped owner of the park, and the duo's boss Benson, a gumball machine. Mordecai and Rigby spend their days slacking off and avoiding work to entertain themselves by any means, which unexpectedly leads to surreal, extreme, and supernatural misconduct.

Many of Regular Show's characters were loosely based on those developed for Quintel's student films at California Institute of the Arts: The Naïve Man from Lolliland and 2 in the AM PM. The former was one of the winners of the 2005 Nicktoons Film Festival and received international attention after being broadcast on Nicktoons Network. Quintel pitched Regular Show for Cartoon Network's Cartoonstitute project, in which the network allowed young artists to create pilots with no notes, which would possibly be optioned as shows.

Regular Show was nominated for several awards, including seven Annie Awards, six Primetime Emmy Awards—winning one for the episode "Eggscellent" (season 3, episode 17)—and three British Academy Children's Awards. A film adaptation based on the series, titled Regular Show: The Movie, premiered in 2015. On June 12, 2024, Warner Bros. Discovery announced that a new series featuring some characters from Regular Show had been greenlit, with Quintel returning as showrunner. The series, titled Regular Show: The Lost Tapes, premiered on May 11, 2026.

== Premise ==
From left to right: Pops, Benson, Skips, Rigby, Mordecai, Muscle Man, and Hi-Five Ghost

The series revolves around the daily lives of two 23-year-old friends – Mordecai (voiced by J. G. Quintel), a blue jay, and Rigby (William Salyers), a raccoon – who work as groundskeepers at a park and spend their days slacking off and avoiding work to entertain themselves by any means, which unexpectedly leads to surreal, extreme, and supernatural misconduct. This is much to the chagrin of their boss Benson (Sam Marin), a gumball machine, and their coworker Skips (Mark Hamill), an immortal yeti, but to the delight of Pops (Marin), the lollipop-shaped son of the park's owner, Mr. Maellard (David Ogden Stiers). Their other coworkers include an overweight green male named Muscle Man (Marin) and a ghost named Hi-Five Ghost (Quintel), who occasionally serve as their rivals.

== Development ==
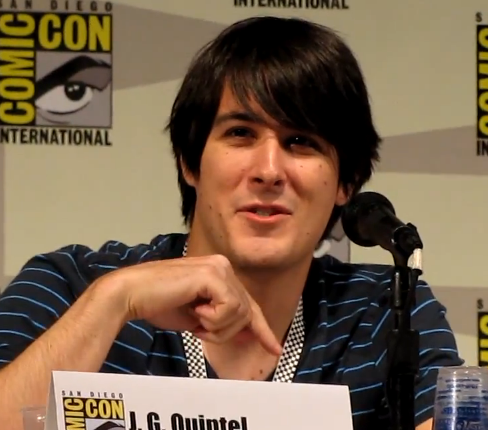
J. G. Quintel, creator of the show, and voice of Mordecai and Hi-Five Ghost, based the show on his student films produced at CalArts

Regular Show largely grew out of creator J. G. Quintel's life and experiences in college. Quintel attended the California Institute of the Arts, and many of the characters on Regular Show are based on the characters developed for his student films The Naïve Man from Lolliland (2005) and 2 in the AM PM (2006). Both originated as part of the 48-Hour Film Project, in which students put words into a hat, pulled out one word at midnight and spent a weekend developing ideas for a film. Quintel attended college with Thurop Van Orman and Pendleton Ward, who both went on to work at Cartoon Network Studios with Quintel; Van Orman created The Marvelous Misadventures of Flapjack and Ward created Adventure Time. Quintel concurrently worked on Camp Lazlo and as creative director on The Marvelous Misadventures of Flapjack while completing his degree. He was later invited to pitch for Cartoon Network's Cartoonstitute, a project to showcase short films created without the interference of network executives and focus testing.

Quintel returned to the characters from his films, put them together with newer characters and created a pilot. Quintel wanted to present a visual pitch rather than a verbal one, believing the idea would make little sense otherwise. He storyboarded the idea for the pilot, and Craig McCracken and Rob Renzetti liked his presentation. Regular Show was one of two series from the project that were green-lit – the other being Secret Mountain Fort Awesome, based on the Cartoonstitute short Uncle Grandpa, which in turn became its own series later on. The project was eventually scrapped and never premiered on television. The character of Mordecai embodies Quintel during his college years, specifically at CalArts; Quintel said, "That's that time when you're hanging out with your friends and getting into stupid situations, but you're also taking it seriously enough." The character of Rigby was developed when Quintel drew a raccoon hula-hooping. He liked the design and made Rigby far less responsible than his companion.

Quintel recruited several independent comic book artists to draw the show's animated elements; their style matched closely with Quintel's ideas for the series. The show's soundtrack comprises original music composed by Mark Mothersbaugh as well as licensed songs. While preparing for the beginning of the show, Quintel looked for young, independent comic artists to comprise the show's storyboard artists; he thought that the style would closely match that of Regular Show. He looked through blogs and convention panels for the "total package", which he said was the ability to write and draw, something that many independent comic book artists possess. In addition, Quintel attended many open shows at CalArts, an eight-hour festival of student animation. The style and sensibility of Regular Show was difficult to work with in the beginning; the artists struggled to create a natural, sitcom-like sound for the series.

=== Inspirations ===
Growing up, Quintel was inspired by The Simpsons and Beavis and Butt-Head, and credits the stylistic elements of Joe Murray's Rocko's Modern Life and Camp Lazlo as working their way into his style. Video games Street Fighter, Shadowrun and ToeJam & Earl—which Quintel played when he was a child—also inspired the series, as did some British television programs. Quintel's interest in British television was influenced by his British roommate at CalArts, who introduced him to The League of Gentlemen, The IT Crowd, Little Britain, The Office, and The Mighty Boosh; the latter was very influential to Quintel and would later influence the humor in Regular Show.

== Production ==
=== Writing ===
The plots of Regular Show episodes generally begin with a basic problem that the characters must overcome. While the protagonists work on their task, a magical, supernatural or strange element appears and complicates the initially simple problem. The writers decided to follow this narrative structure to take advantage of the animation.

The series was rated TV-PG. Cartoon Network told Quintel early on that they wanted to "age it up from the TV-Y7 stuff [they'd] been doing in the past". This direction led the crew to use more adult-oriented humor, with light vulgarity and references to alcohol.

The plots of the episodes were influenced by Quintel's and the writers' personal experiences, such as performing prank telephone calls or accepting an eating challenge from a restaurant. The show often references 1980s culture, using music and electronic devices from that era since many factors from the decade left a positive influence on Quintel. The show also makes references to modern social trends such as viral internet videos.

=== Voice cast ===
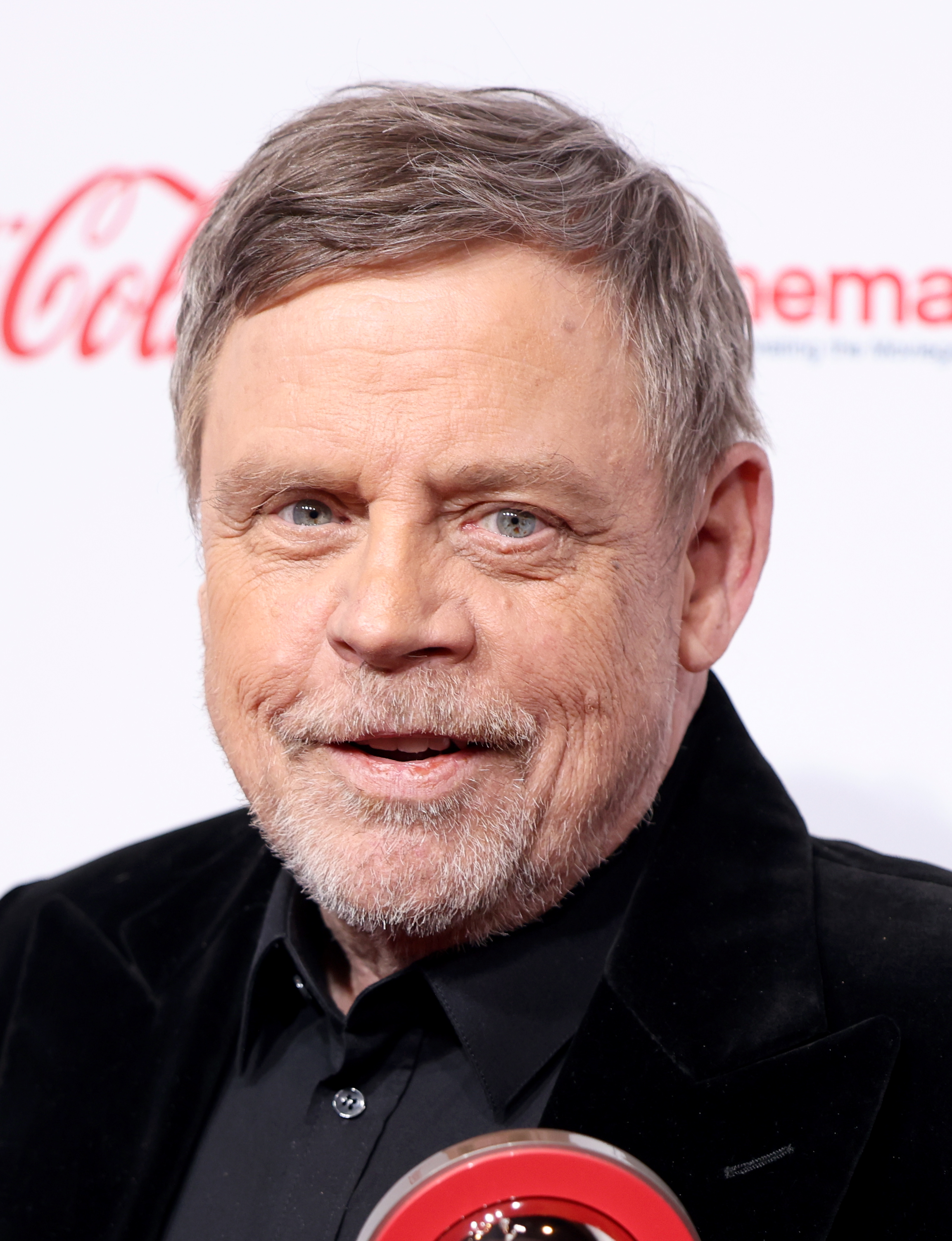
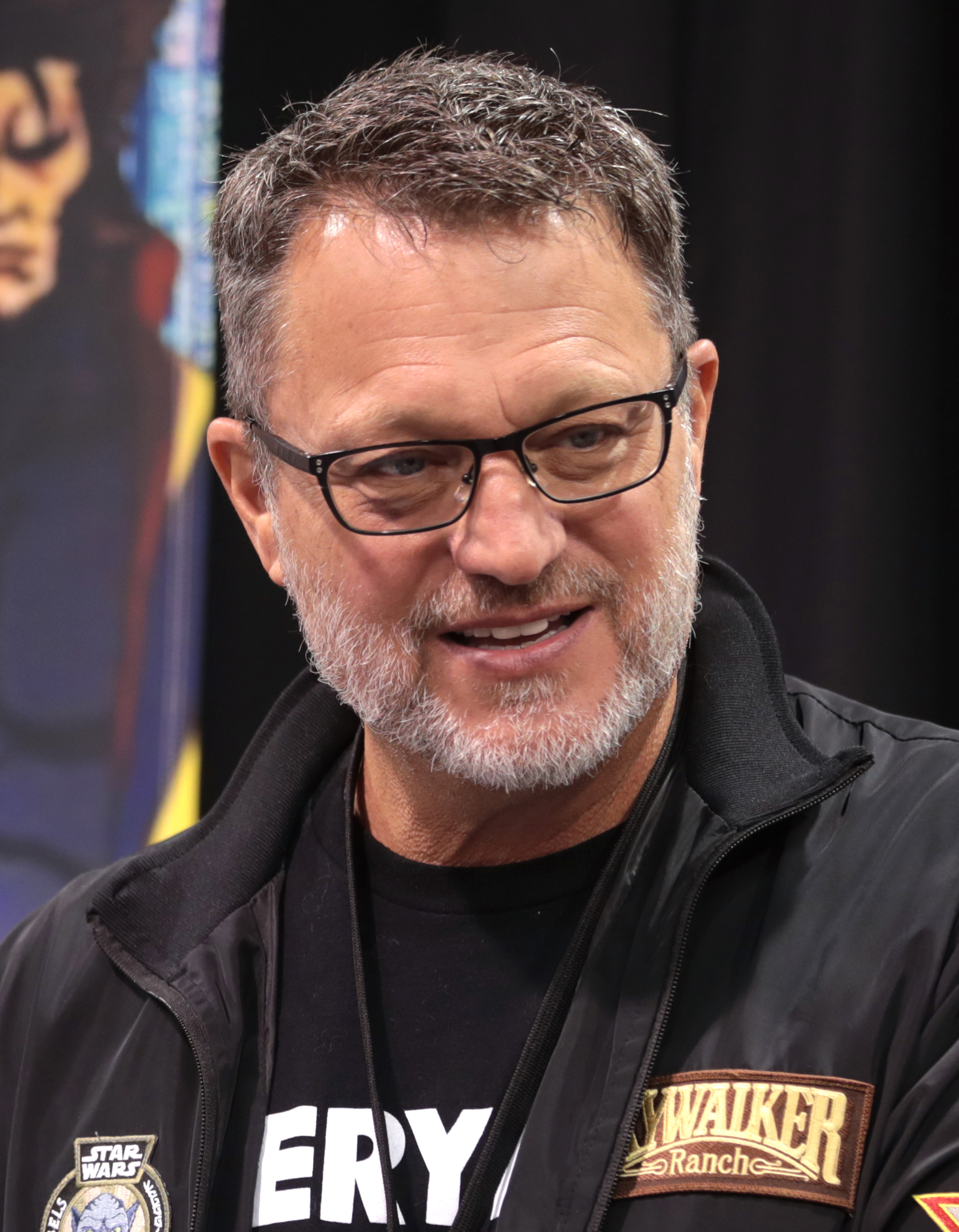
The series has voice actors Mark Hamill (left) and Steven Blum (right), among others

The intention of the show's voice acting was to make most of the characters sound more "natural" and "conversational" (having the characters not talk loudly). Quintel wanted to make the show listenable and given contrast to most other cartoons, which can be difficult for adults to listen to. The main cast consists of voice acting veterans Mark Hamill, who portrays Skips, and Roger Craig Smith, who plays Thomas. William Salyers plays the voice of Rigby; Janie Haddad portrays Margaret; Quintel's former CalArts classmate Sam Marin voices Benson, Pops, and Muscle Man; and Quintel portrays Mordecai and Hi-Five Ghost. Members of the production staff have voiced several characters throughout the series, including Minty Lewis, Toby Jones, Andress Salaff, and Matt Price. The Regular Show cast recorded their lines together in group as opposed to individual recording sessions for each actor (a technique that was later used for Pig Goat Banana Cricket); this helped make the show's dialogue sound "natural". The series regularly used guest voice actors for recurring characters, such as Steven Blum, Courtenay Taylor, David Ogden Stiers, Robin Atkin Downes, Jeff Bennett, Jennifer Hale, David Kaye, Fred Tatasciore, Matthew Yang King, and Julian Holloway.

=== Animation ===
Each episode of Regular Show took about nine months to complete. Quintel and his 35-member team developed each episode at Cartoon Network Studios in Burbank, California. The script was illustrated in rough hand-drawn storyboards. The storyboards were then animated and mixed with the corresponding dialogue to create the animatic, which was then sent to be approved by the network. The show's assets – backgrounds, character designs, props, etc. – were then assembled to be sent to Saerom Animation in South Korea, where the actual animation production of the episode was performed. When finished, the episode was sent to Sabre Media Studios back in California. Music and sound effects were created, and the final episode was mixed and completed. The process allowed the production team to work concurrently on dozens of episodes at different stages of production.

Although most modern animation had switched to hybrid methods such as the Cintiq, Regular Show was animated traditionally by hand using paper, which was then digitally composited and painted with digital ink and paint. Although Cintiqs were initially optioned to be used for the show, Quintel stated that he felt more comfortable working on paper, considering it to be more organic and more representative of each artist's individual style. Board artist Calvin Wong said, "the tools of the trade as being pencils, pens, white-out, and occasionally lightboxes and electric erasers".

=== Music ===
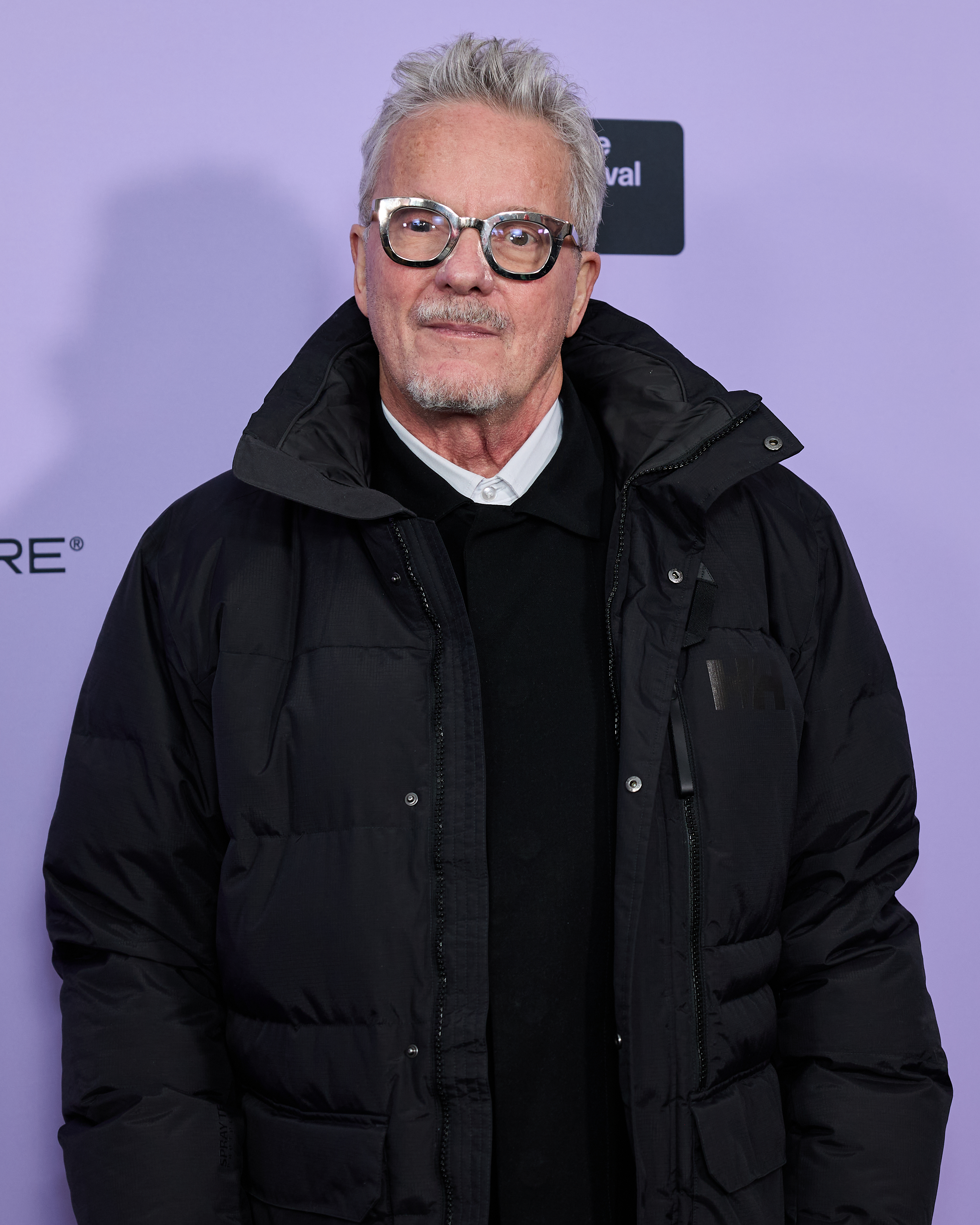
Musician Mark Mothersbaugh worked as the main composer of the show

The main composer of the series is Mark Mothersbaugh, one of the founding members of the band Devo. As Quintel was developing the pilot, he considered asking Mothersbaugh to create the music for the show. The episode's animatic was sent to Mothersbaugh, along with a request for him to join the show's staff and crew.

Regular Show also made use of licensed songs — mostly from the 1980s — which began when Quintel and the staff writers started recording the animatics using copyrighted songs for the montage scenes. The network executives watched the animatic and asked the crew if they wanted to use some of the songs for the finished episodes. Quintel said that the songs are chosen for their suitability for the scene, whether they sound good, and if their licensing is affordable. Quintel enjoyed using the songs in the episodes, saying he thought adult viewers may remember them and younger viewers might appreciate older music. Some songs used in the show include "I'm Alright", "You're the Best Around", "Mississippi Queen", "Don't You (Forget About Me)" and "A Holly Jolly Christmas". The show also used several non-'80s songs, such as "Pale Blue Eyes" by The Velvet Underground in Regular Show: The Movie and "'Heroes'" by David Bowie in the series finale. Another notable song used in the show is "Here Comes a Regular" by The Replacements, a band often considered as underground.

The show also produced original songs that were used in episodes, which were generally composed by Mothersbaugh and written by one of the staff's storyboard artists. "Summertime Loving, Loving in the Summer (Time)" was written by staff member Sean Szeles and appeared in the episode "This Is My Jam" (season 2, episode 13).

== Episodes ==
Most episodes of Regular Show last 11 minutes; episodes are usually paired together to fill a half-hour program slot. 244 episodes in eight seasons have been completed and broadcast. The first season premiered on September 6, 2010, with the episode "The Power" and ended on November 22, 2010, with "Mordecai and the Rigbys". The second season premiered on November 29, 2010, with the episode "Ello Gov'nor" and ended on August 1, 2011, with "Karaoke Video". The third season premiered on September 19, 2011, with the episode "Stick Hockey" and concluded on September 3, 2012, with "Bad Kiss". The fourth season premiered on October 1, 2012, with the half-hour episode "Exit 9B" and concluded on August 12, 2013, with "Steak Me Amadeus". The fifth season premiered on September 2, 2013, with the episodes "Laundry Woes" and "Silver Dude" and concluded on August 14, 2014, with "Real Date". The sixth season premiered on October 9, 2014, with the episode "Maxin' and Relaxin'" and ended on June 25, 2015, with "Dumped at the Altar". The seventh season premiered with the episode "Dumptown U.S.A." on June 26, 2015, and ended with the half-hour episode "Rigby's Graduation Day Special" on June 30, 2016. The eighth and final season, titled Regular Show in Space, premiered on September 26, 2016, with the episode "One Space Day at a Time" and ended on January 16, 2017, with "A Regular Epic Final Battle".

Season	Episodes	Originally released	
Season	Episodes	First released	Last released
Precursors	2	August 24, 2005	May 11, 2006
Pilot		August 14, 2009	
1	12	September 6, 2010	November 22, 2010
2	28	November 29, 2010	August 1, 2011
3	39	September 19, 2011	September 3, 2012
4	37	October 1, 2012	August 12, 2013
5	37	September 2, 2013	August 14, 2014
6	28	October 9, 2014	June 25, 2015
7	36	June 26, 2015	June 30, 2016
Film		November 25, 2015	
8	27	September 26, 2016	January 16, 2017

== Reception ==
=== Ratings ===
Regular Show became an instant hit. Its first and second seasons, ranked number one in its time slot among all key boy demos across all of television, according to Nielsen Media Research. The pilot's premiere was watched by 2.097 million viewers. For the following episodes of the first season, viewership increased by over 10% from the time period of the previous year. For instance, the entry was viewed by 1.339 million children aged 2–11, a 65% increase from the previous year. It was also watched by 716,000 children aged 9–14, a 43% increase. The Season 2 premiere, "Ello Gov'nor," marked a decline from the Season 1 premiere's figures. It gained 2.067 million views, but it marked an increase from the Season 1 finale, which had 2.028 million viewers. The Season 3 premiere, "Stick Hockey," saw a bigger decline in viewers, recording 2 million views. As the series continued, though, its ratings grew for a short time; the Season 4 premiere, "Exit 9B", was watched by 3.047 million viewers—a significant increase from previous seasons.

=== Critical reception ===
"What I like best about Regular Show is that in the midst of a gaggle of memorable regular characters, zany recurring minor characters, and a fantastical animation style, it still manages to create motifs for its condensed themes."

— Kevin McFarland, The A.V. Club

A reviewer from IGN, R.L. Shaffer, called the show zany, absurd, bizarre and hilarious. He praised the show's writing and said that it included "snappy dialogue, odd characters, and clever stories—each more irreverent than the last—Regular Show never ceases to tickle the funny bone." He finished his review by calling the show "a pretty awesome piece of refreshing off-the-wall comedy" and wrote that it's "humorously animated, brazenly silly and almost always funny."

DVD Talk's Neil Lumbrad described the show as "offbeat sense of humor with a lot of randomness that makes its title both peculiar and hilarious" and compared it to the original Looney Tunes shorts and other cartoons—including The Powerpuff Girls, Dexter's Laboratory, and Johnny Bravo—that Cartoon Network has produced. He wrote that the network found "animated gold with Regular Show, which is too offbeat and unique to be called regular" and that it is a "comedic animated gem worthy of being discovered for years to come". Lumbrad ended his review by recommending the show and calling it "one truly awesome cartoon with a lot of good humor to enjoy".

Alasdair Wilkins of The A.V. Club said that compared to another of Cartoon Network's animated comedies, Adventure Time, he does not consider the series to be funny, and described it as "more pleasingly weird". He said that the episodes' plots can occasionally be too complex to explore completely in the show's 11 minutes and that the usual story setup can make some stories feel structurally the same as others. Wilkins said he considers the show at its best when it focuses on the jokes, the character moments and inventive ways to use animation. Kevin McFarland, also of The A.V. Club, said he considers the series a thrill to watch; he complimented the animation style, characters and use of motifs. Entertainment Weekly ranked Regular Show seventh on its list of "10 Best Cartoon Network Shows" in 2012.

=== Awards and nominations ===
Year	Award	Category	Nominee(s)	Result	Ref.
2011	38th Annie Awards	Best Animated Television Production for Children	Regular Show	Nominated	
2011	63rd Primetime Creative Arts Emmy Awards	Outstanding Short-format Animated Program	"Mordecai and the Rigbys"	Nominated	
2011	British Academy Children's Awards	Kids Vote Powered By Yahoo! – Top 10s – Television	Regular Show	Nominated	
2011	British Academy Children's Awards	International	Janet Dimon, J. G. Quintel, and Mike Roth	Nominated	
2012	39th Annie Awards	Storyboarding in a Television Production	Benton Connor	Nominated	
2012	64th Primetime Creative Arts Emmy Awards	Outstanding Short-format Animated Program	"Eggscellent"	Won	
2013	British Academy Children's Awards	International	Regular Show	Nominated	
2013	3rd Critics' Choice Television Awards	Best Animated Series	Regular Show	Nominated	
2013	65th Primetime Creative Arts Emmy Awards	Outstanding Short-format Animated Program	"A Bunch of Full-Grown Geese"	Nominated	
2013	65th Primetime Creative Arts Emmy Awards	Outstanding Animated Program	"The Christmas Special"	Nominated	
2014	41st Annie Awards	Best Animated TV/Broadcast Production For Children's Audience	Regular Show	Nominated	
2014	41st Annie Awards	Outstanding Achievement, Character Design in an Animated TV/Broadcast Production	Ben Adams	Nominated	
2014	41st Annie Awards	Outstanding Achievement, Voice Acting in an Animated TV/Broadcast Production	Mark Hamill as Skips and Walks	Nominated	
2014	41st Annie Awards	Outstanding Achievement, Writing in an Animated TV/Broadcast Production	Matt Price, John Infantino, Mike Roth, Michele Cavin, and Sean Szeles	Nominated	
2014	66th Primetime Creative Arts Emmy Awards	Outstanding Short-format Animated Program	"The Last LaserDisc Player"	Nominated	
2014	2014 Teen Choice Awards	Choice TV: Animated Show	Regular Show	Nominated	
2014	Kids' Choice Awards Colombia	Favorite Animated Series	Regular Show	Nominated	
2014	Kids' Choice Awards Mexico	Favorite Animated Series	Regular Show	Nominated	
2014	British Academy Children's Awards	BAFTA Kid's Vote – Television	Regular Show	Nominated	
2014	Hall of Game Awards	Most Valuable Cartoon	Regular Show	Nominated	
2015	42nd Annie Awards	Best General Audience Animated TV/Broadcast Production	Regular Show	Nominated	
2015	British Academy Children's Awards	BAFTA Kid's Vote – Television	Regular Show	Nominated	
2015	2015 Teen Choice Awards	Choice TV: Animated Show	Regular Show	Nominated	
2015	67th Primetime Creative Arts Emmy Awards	Outstanding Short-format Animated Program	"White Elephant Gift Exchange"	Nominated	

== Related media ==
=== Spin-offs ===
On June 12, 2024, Warner Bros. Discovery announced that a new Regular Show series titled Regular Show: The Lost Tapes had been greenlit for two seasons, with Quintel returning as showrunner. On September 30, 2024, Mark Hamill confirmed that he would reprise his role as Skips. The Lost Tapes officially premiered on Cartoon Network on May 11, 2026.

=== Comic books ===
A series of original graphic novels began publication in 2014. The first, titled Hydration, was written by Rachel Connor and illustrated by Tessa Stone. It was followed by Noir Means Noir, Buddy (2015), A Clash of Consoles (2016), Wrasslesplosion (2017), The Meatening (2018) and Comic Conned (2018). A crossover comic book series titled Adventure Time × Regular Show was released from August 2017 – January 2018.

=== Video games ===
On November 9, 2011, a game called "Nightmare-Athon" was released in App Store for iOS. On April 8, 2013, J. G. Quintel announced on his Twitter page that an official Regular Show video game was in development at the time, titled Regular Show: Mordecai and Rigby in 8-Bit Land. It was developed by WayForward Technologies and published by D3 Publisher for Nintendo 3DS. The video game was released on October 29, 2013. On January 26, 2026, Epic Games announced that Mordecai would have a playable skin and Rigby as a sidekick in Chapter 7 of Fortnite with a release date of January 30, 2026.

=== Film ===
At the Cartoon Network 2015/2016 upfront, it was announced they were making Regular Show: The Movie. After accidentally creating a "Timenado", Mordecai and Rigby go back in time and battle an evil volleyball coach in order to save the universe – and their friendship. It first screened at The Downtown Independent in Los Angeles on August 14, 2015. It was released to digital download on September 1, 2015, as well as on DVD by Warner Home Video on October 13, 2015, and had its television premiere in November 2015. The movie also screened at select Alamo Drafthouse Cinemas across the United States.

=== Other appearances ===
Jazwares has produced an assortment of two-, six-, seven- and 10-inch licensed action figures and plush toys for the series. "Collectable Figures" have also been released, along with other themed merchandise, such as "80's Bobbleheads", "Pullback Custom Cruisers" and "Wrestling Buddies". Looney Labs also released a Regular Show-themed version of the card game Fluxx on July 25, 2014. Mordecai and Rigby had cameo appearances on the Uncle Grandpa episode "Pizza Eve", along with other Cartoon Network characters from currently running and ended cartoons. Mordecai, Rigby and Hi-Five Ghost make a small cameo in The Amazing World of Gumball episode "The Boredom", along with the titular characters from Uncle Grandpa and Clarence.

== Home media ==
=== Region 1 ===
Region	Set title	Season(s)	Aspect ratio	Number of discs	Episode count	Time length	Release date
1	Slack Pack	1, 2	16:9	1	12	137 minutes	April 3, 2012
1	The Best DVD in the World *At this Moment in Time	2, 3	16:9	1	16	176 minutes	November 6, 2012
1	Party Pack	1, 2, 3	16:9	1	16	176 minutes	March 5, 2013
1/A	The Complete First and Second Seasons	1, 2	16:9	3 (DVD); 2 (Blu-ray)	40	440 minutes	July 16, 2013
1	Fright Pack	1, 2, 3, 4	16:9	1	13	176 minutes	September 3, 2013
1	Mordecai & Margaret Pack	1, 2, 3, 4	16:9	1	16	176 minutes	March 4, 2014
1	The Complete Third Season	3	16:9	3	39	440 minutes	June 17, 2014
1	Rigby Pack	1, 2, 3, 4, 5	16:9	1	16	176 minutes	September 9, 2014
1	Mordecai Pack	3, 4, 5, 6	16:9	1	16	176 minutes	January 27, 2015
1	The Complete Series	1–8, Regular Show: The Movie	16:9	19	261	5612 minutes	February 4, 2025

=== Region 4 ===
Region	Set title	Season(s)	Aspect ratio	Episode count	Time length	Release date
4	The Complete First Season	1	16:9	12	132 minutes	October 2, 2013
4	The Complete Second Season	2	16:9	28	308 minutes	November 6, 2013
4	The Complete Third Season	3	16:9	39	440 minutes	July 9, 2014
4	The Complete Fourth Season	4	16:9	37	440 minutes	February 3, 2016
4	The Complete Seasons One – Four	1, 2, 3, 4	16:9	116	1320 minutes	February 3, 2016
4	The Complete Fifth Season	5	16:9	37	440 minutes	September 7, 2016
4	The Complete Sixth Season	6	16:9	28	341 minutes	March 8, 2017
4	The Complete Seventh Season	7	16:9	36	429 minutes	July 19, 2017
4	The Complete Eighth Season	8	16:9	28	341 minutes	November 22, 2017

== See also ==
- Close Enough – 2020–2023 series by Quintel
