= Vending Times =

American trade magazine

- Categories: Trade magazine
- Founded: 1961
- First issue: 1961
- Country: United States
- Based in: Rockville Centre, New York
- Language: English

Vending Times is one of the most popular trade magazines for the U.S. vending industry. It attempts to cover the entire vending industry, addressing the business, legal, legislative and regulatory concerns of companies providing industrial, institutional and public vending, refreshment, feeding and recreational services. These companies include operators of food, beverage and other merchandise vending equipment as well as manual foodservice; office beverage and snack delivery systems; and music and amusement equipment and services.

The headquarters of Vending Times is in Rockville Centre, New York.

== History ==
Vending Times was founded in 1961 to serve the coin-op industry. It broadened its scope to encompass full-line vending, soft-drink bottling, and operators of street cigarette, candy and jukebox routes. It continued to broaden its scope, including bulk vending, office coffee service, and mobile catering. Circa 1971, Vending Times acquired Vend, a publication launched in 1946. Today, the magazine has more than 16,000 subscribers. The magazine's average page count is about 150 pages.
