= Folz Vending =

American bulk vending company

Folz Vending was the largest bulk vending company in the United States.

== History ==
=== 20th century ===
The company was founded in New York by brothers Harold J. Folz and Roger C. Folz in 1949. Roger Folz, a 1946 graduate of Woodmere High School in New York described himself as college dropout who became an “errand boy” at Merrill Lynch before experimenting with vending machines to make money on the side. He obtained his first machine in August 1949 which dispensed pistachios in a bar in Long Island, NY. He soon expanded into gumballs and had his first big success placing the machines in W. T. Grant discount stores. That first national contract led to more machines with more diverse contents. Folz was the first major vendor to offer toys in addition to gumballs. New toy ideas were tested locally in Long Island, NY.

In the 1990s the machines vended toys branded with Pokémon, the National Football League, the Spice Girls, and Michael Jackson.

=== 21st century ===
The company had machines installed in Walmart, Safeway Inc., Toys "R" Us, and KMart stores. Each machine generated approximately $35 a month in quarters. The company operated 150,000 machines and had sales in excess of $55 million in 2002.

Roger Folz sold the company to American Coin Merchandising, Inc. in 2003. American Coin Merchandising was sold to Coinstar in 2004 for $235 million. Coinstar closed Folz Vending in 2007.

Roger Folz died in New York at the age of 86 on April 29, 2014.
