= Big League Chew =

American brand of sweet bubble gum

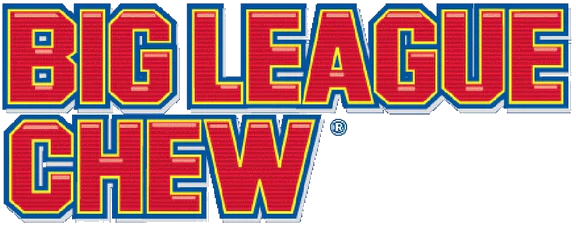

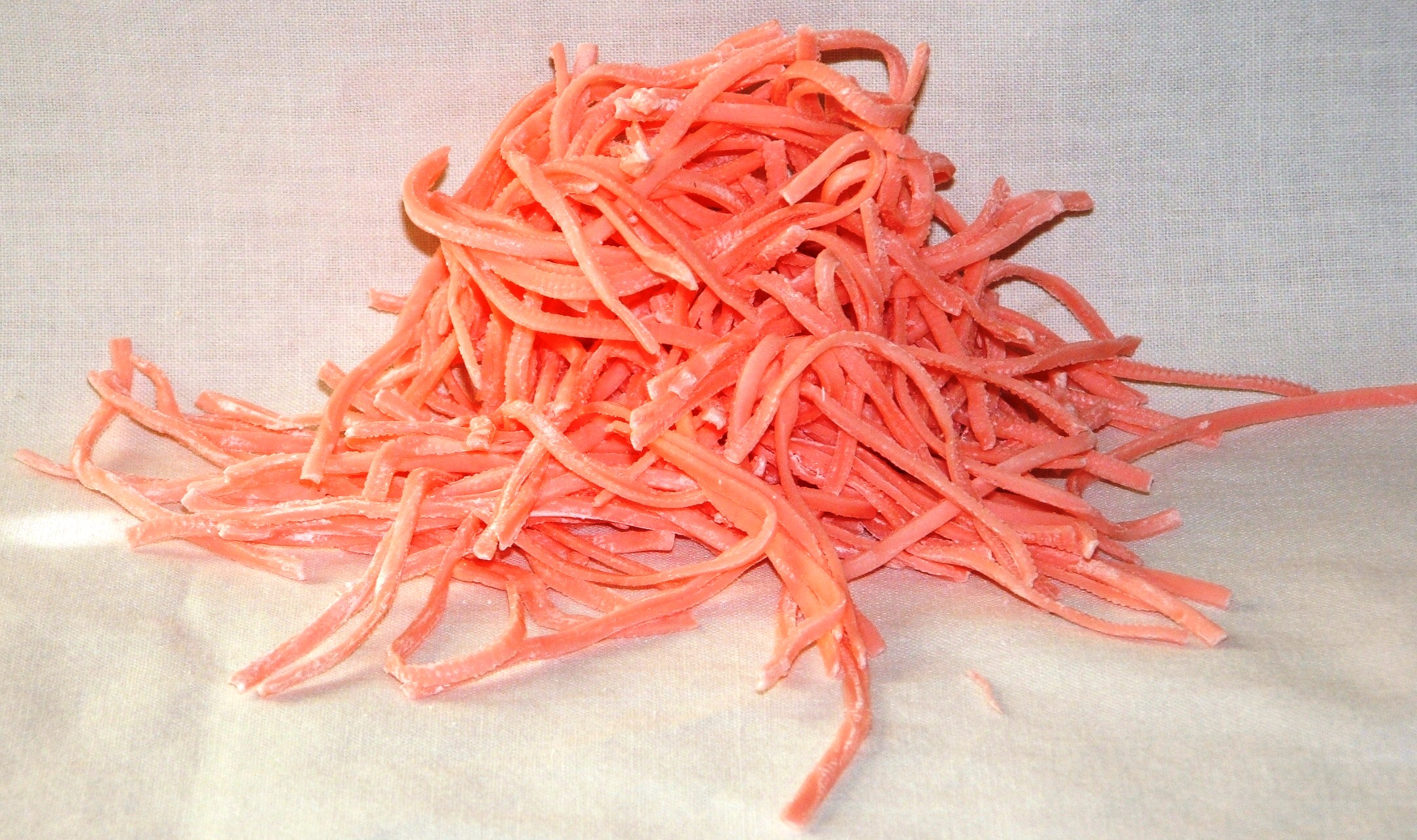
- Outta' Here Original variety Big League Chew
- Product type: Bubble gum
- Current owner: Big League Chew Properties
- Country: United States
- Introduced: May 1980; 46 years ago
- Tagline: "The Hall of Fame Bubble Gum"
- Website: bigleaguechew.com

Big League Chew is an American brand of shredded bubble gum made to resemble a chewing tobacco pouch. It was created by Portland Mavericks left-handed pitcher Rob Nelson and bat boy Todd Field.. It was then pitched to the Wrigley Company (longtime owners of the Chicago Cubs) by fellow Maverick and former New York Yankee All-Star Jim Bouton as a healthy alternative to the tobacco-chewing habit common among ballplayers in the 1970s. Big League Chew was introduced in May 1980, in the traditional pink color already seen in established brands of bubble gum. Currently, it is manufactured in the U.S. by Ford Gum & Machine Company in Akron, New York, under a license from Rob Nelson’s company, Big League Chew Properties. Big League Chew's corporate office is located in Rochester, New York.

Big League Chew proved controversial due to its association with chewing tobacco. Research has linked children's consumption of candy versions of tobacco products to an increased tendency to take up their real-life equivalents.

In April 2023, Nelson announced that over a billion pouches of Big League Chew had been sold worldwide. Big League Chew is the official bubble gum of the Baseball Hall of Fame. In 2023, Big League Chew announced an additional partnership with USA Baseball.

== See also ==
- Candy cigarette
