= Full-line vending =

Company operating several kinds of vending machine

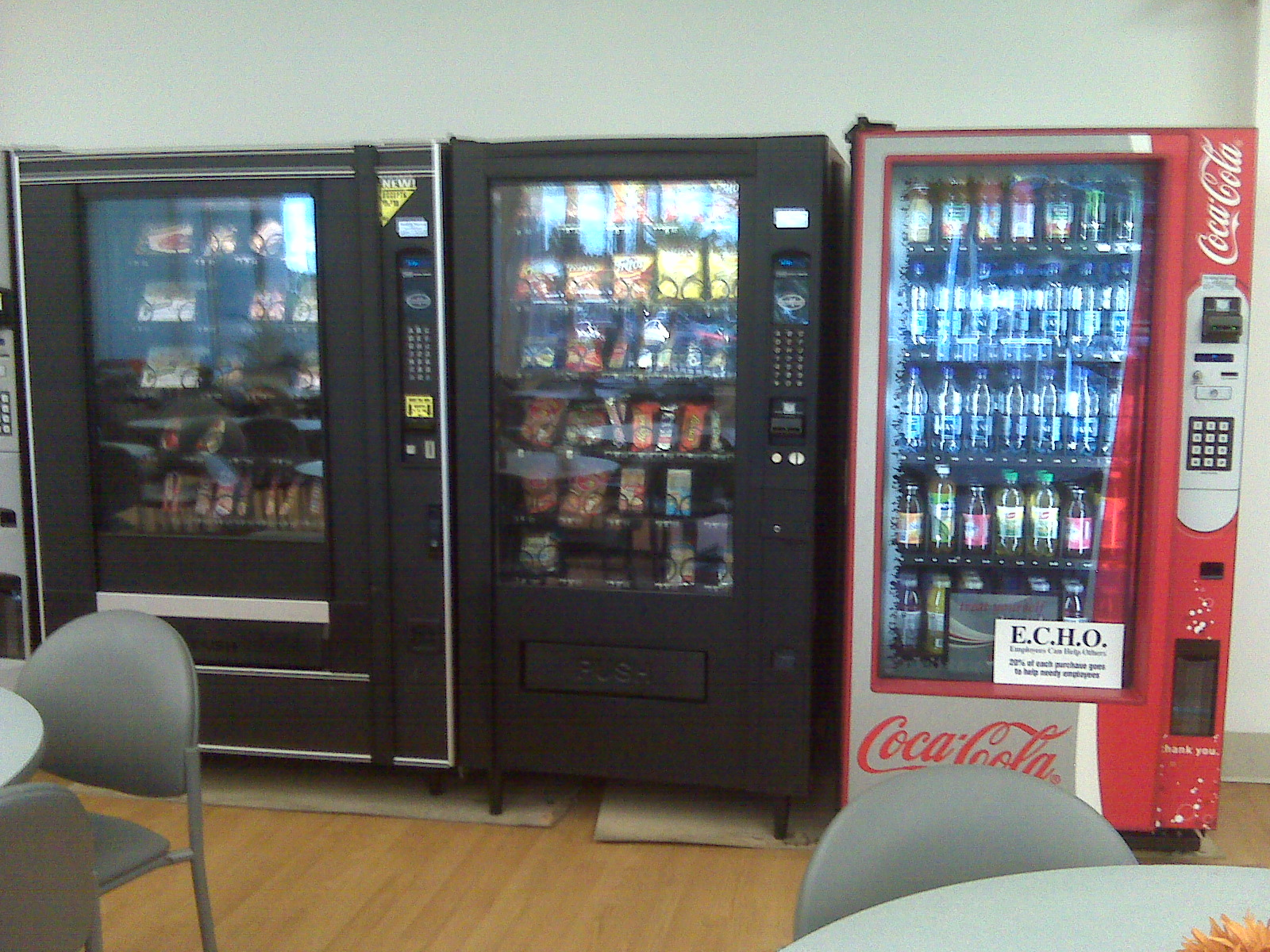
A full line of vending machines in a hospital cafeteria in Punta Gorda, Florida. The line includes a machine for drinks, snacks, frozen foods, and an ATM (ATM not in picture).

A full-line vending business sets up several types of vending machines that sell a wide range of products, such as soft drinks and snacks. Soft drinks are usually sold in 12 fl. oz. (355 ml) and 20 oz. (591 ml) in the United States and sometimes Australia, or 330ml and 500ml in Europe, Canada, and other areas. Snacks, bags of chips, and similar edibles are usually about 1-3 oz.

== Trends ==
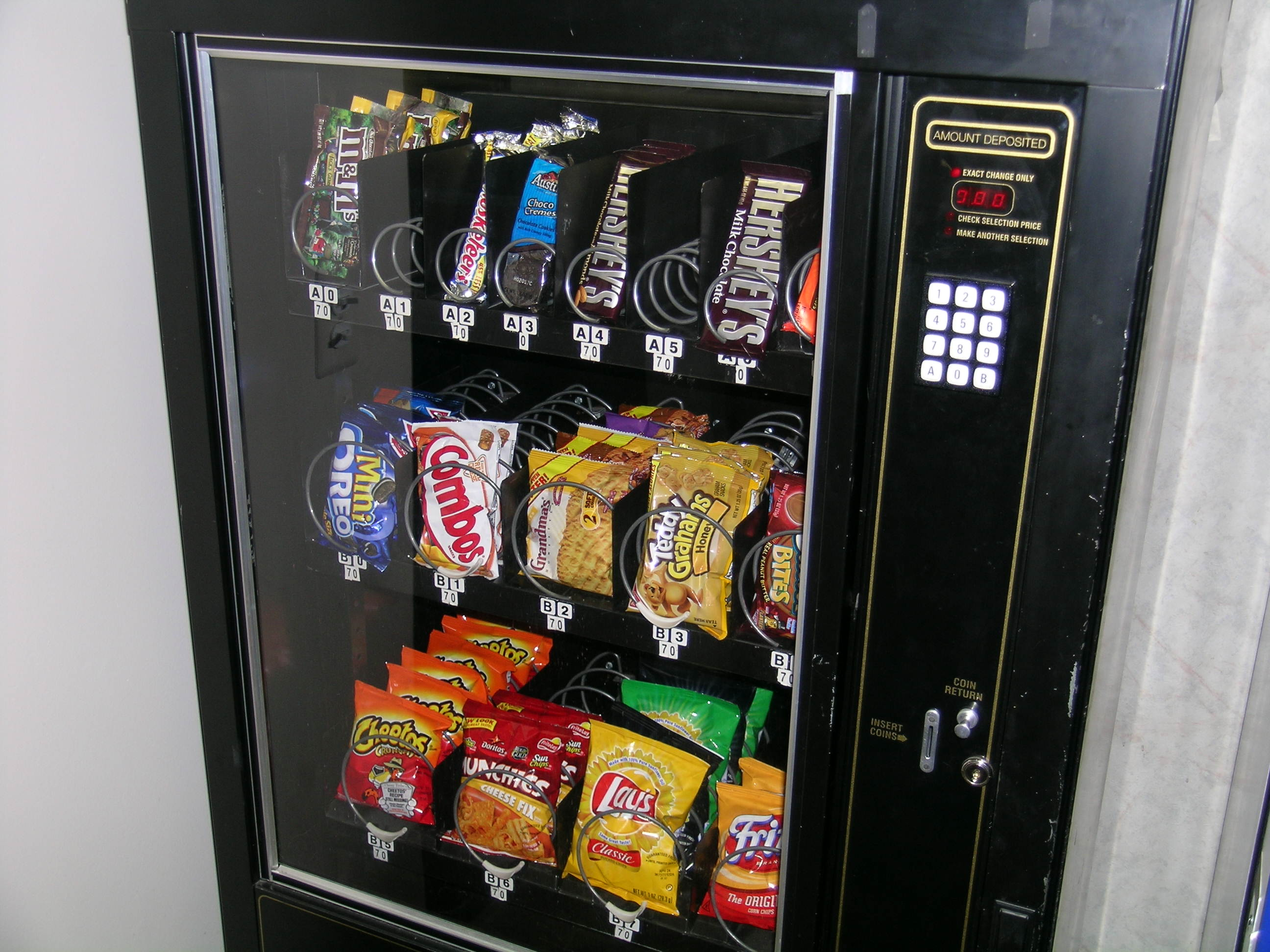
A typical American snack vending machine

In the late 1990s and early 2000s, there was a trend in the U.S. for large national retailers to have contracts with the national vending companies to provide full line vending services to all their branches' lunch / meal rooms. In most cases, managers and staff of individual stores objected to this, because the national vending companies were not necessarily responsive when making the product choices for the machines. As a result, this trend began to reverse. Most full line vending operators are independent and are small operations. Often, they can have the existing vending machines removed and get permission to install their own machines by promising to lower prices, stock the machine with the manager's favorite candies, or provide better service (e.g. servicing the machine the same day if a coin jam or bill validator becomes jammed).

== Business description ==
For operators, soda/snack machines have the advantage that many locations recognize the need for such machines. Many locations will, in fact, take the initiative to contact a vending company to request installation of a machine. Moreover, companies recognize the difficulty in moving these machines and are less likely to request removal, unless the operator does a poor job of servicing the machine. Almost all soda and snack machines have vend counters that track how many items are sold, making it difficult for an employee to steal money. The machines themselves, being large and heavy, are difficult to steal without drawing attention, compared to most bulk vending machines.

Soda and snack machines are relatively expensive, unless they are obtained through a third-party vending program. Compared to bulk vending machines, full line vending machines take a long time to service – as much as an hour for a soda machine that is low on inventory. The product also tends to take up more space. Breakdowns are difficult to repair, due to the complexity of the machines; do-it-yourself repairs may void the warranty. The machines are difficult to move; this task may require the help of professional movers. Moreover, some locations expect a commission.

== Nature of the business ==
There are many types of machines available. One type is the combo machine that sells both sodas and snacks. These combo machines have the disadvantage of not holding much of any product, and therefore requiring frequent servicing. They also suffer from issues with temperature controls, because the desirable temperature for sodas will tend to be lower than that for the snacks. Most operators use separate snack and soda machines.

Finding a good location can be difficult, since many locations already have vending machines, don't want one, or are too tiny to get enough business. An operator may end up paying the store owner a 10% commission, which requires separate accounting for that machine. If the locations are too far apart, the operator may spend so much time driving between locations when filling them that the same amount of time could more profitably be spent working for someone else.

Vendors occasionally enroll in a "charity program", in which the vendor makes a monthly charity donation in exchange for displaying stickers supporting the chosen charity.

Some vending machines are too heavy to carry without special equipment and/or helpers, especially if the machine has to go up or down stairs. As with bulk vending, turnover of accounts (in the event of a store closure or relocation, for instance) requires a repeat of the process of finding a location and moving the machine. Snacks and soda also have lower gross margins than bulk candy. Attention must be paid to the expiration dates on potato chips, sodas, and other products.

The flexibility of a bank in handling coins is an important consideration when choosing the business' financial institution. A bank may not want a bucket of coins, so it may be necessary to find another bank or use machinery to organize coins into rolls. The government will expect taxes, tax forms, tax recordkeeping, and a business license.

== See also ==
- Automat
- Vending Times, trade magazine for the U.S. vending industry
