= Ford Gum =

Brand of bubble gum and chewing gum

- Type: Private
- Headquarters: Akron, NY, United States
- Brands: Big League Chew; Military Energy; Carousel Gumballs
- Website: https://www.fordgum.com/

Ford Gum is an American brand of bubble gum and chewing gum often found in gum machines. It is produced by Ford Gum & Machine Co. The history of the company goes back to 1913, when Ford Mason leased 102 machines and placed them in stores and shops in New York City. The gumballs, while they are covered with different flavors, all have the same flavor under the surface.

Ford Gum is also available in a square "chiclet" shape, with the same colors/flavors as the gumballs.

In 1962, Thomas E. Conner, a Ford Gum manager, became acquainted with Nancy Reagan's family. In meeting Reagan he asked him to do a Public Service Announcement for Ford Gum, which Reagan voluntarily did on Conner's portable tape recorder.

In 1985, Ford Gum was acquired by Leaf. Leaf's American operations were acquired by Hershey in 1996, and Ford Gum was subject to a management buyout the next year.

Today, Ford Gum and Machine Co. is headquartered in Akron, New York. The company is the only large scale manufacturer of gumballs in the US. Their primary competitors, Tootsie Roll's Dubble Bubble and SweetWorks' Oak Leaf Confections, manufacture gumballs and confectionery products in Canada.

Ford Gum owns the trademark on "Carousel" and manufactures and distributes a complete line of bulk gumball products and toy gumball machines under Carousel brand. Ford is the first and only company to manufacture and distribute sugar free gumballs. Carousel gumballs come in a variety of flavors, sizes and colors. Ford Gum also makes private label gum and mints.

As of 2015, most of their gum products are certified Kosher by the BVK, the Buffalo Vaad HaKashrus under the direction of Rabbi Moshe Taub.

Ford Gum acquired the rights to Big League Chew from Wm. Wrigley Jr. Company in 2010 and was to begin production of the product in November of that year.
