= Gumball machine =

Toy or commercial device which dispenses gumballs

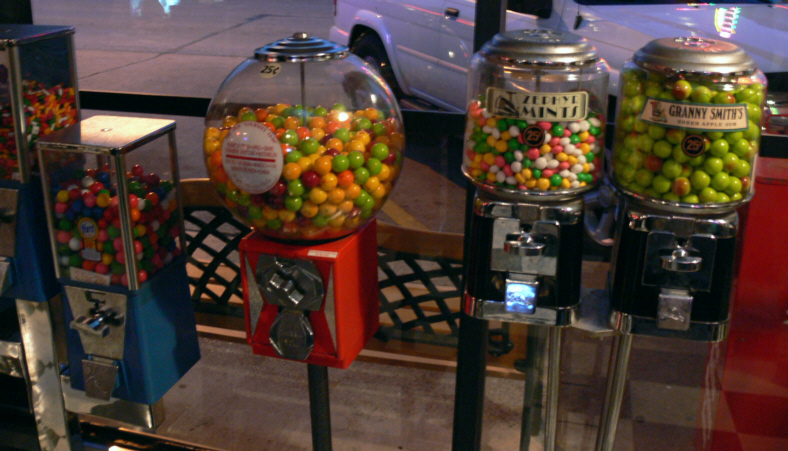
An assortment of modern gumball machines in a Dallas storefront

A gumball machine is a type of bulk vending machine that dispenses individual gumballs in exchange for money. They were developed around the early twentieth century.

== History ==
Although vending machines for stick or block-shaped gum were seen as early as 1888, the first machines to carry actual gumballs were not seen until 1907 (probably released first by the Thomas Adams Gum Co. in the United States). Patented in 1923, the Norris Manufacturing Company produced their "Master" line of chrome gumball machines during the 1930s. These machines could accept either pennies or nickels.

Founded in 1934, the Ford Gum and Machine Company of Akron, New York was another early manufacturer of gum for gumball machines in the U.S. The Ford brand of gumball machines had a distinct shiny chrome color; sales of gum from Ford gumball machines went to local service organizations such as the Lions Club and Kiwanis International.

Founded in 1909, Northwestern Corporation started with kitchen matches and eventually came out with the Northwestern Model 33 in 1933 (naming for the year which it came out) and eventually the Model 60 and Model 80, both of which are still sold today.

== Design and operation ==
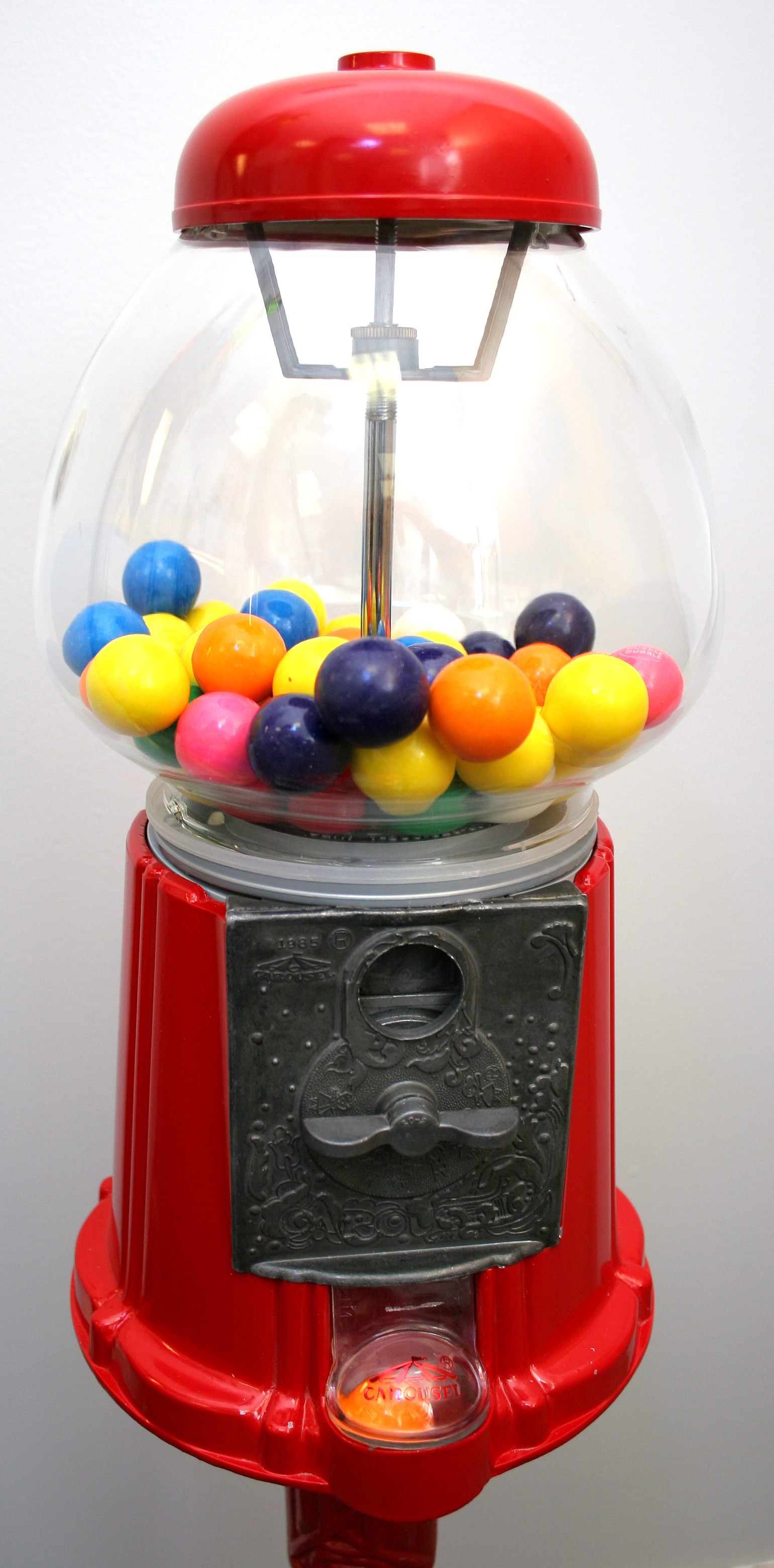
A gumball machine

Generally, a gumball machine consists of a clear sphere (originally glass, now most often plastic) which is filled with gumballs, sitting on top of a metal base. It has a locked metal top which can be removed to restock the machine. A coin is inserted into the base and a knob is turned clockwise 360 degrees, depositing the coin in the base of the machine and allowing a gumball or trinket to be dispensed into a chute at the bottom of the machine that is closed off by a metal flap.

Most gumball machines have a simple mechanism for dispensing the gumball, to the point of the actual dispensation being largely invisible (after turning the handle the gumball is deposited behind the door). However, some gumball machines have more elaborate methods. Most of them utilize the potential energy of the gumball's location above the base, by, for instance, causing it to roll down a spiral ramp, or a set of diagonal disks (each one is tilted in the opposite direction than the preceding one) with holes in lowest point. The most elaborate mechanisms also use electricity to power various forms of transit (e.g. lifts and pulleys) as well as ramps and drops for the gumball upon its way to dispensation.

== See also ==
- Gashapon
