= Saving Bikini Bottom: The Sandy Cheeks Movie =

2024 film by Liza Johnson

- Promotional release poster
- Directed by: Liza Johnson
- Teleplay by: Kaz; Tom Stern
- Story by: Kaz
- Based on: SpongeBob SquarePants by Stephen Hillenburg
- Produced by: Robert Engleman
- Starring: Carolyn Lawrence; Tom Kenny; Clancy Brown; Bill Fagerbakke; Mr. Lawrence; Rodger Bumpass; Johnny Knoxville; Craig Robinson; Grey DeLisle; Ilia Isorelýs Paulino; Matty Cardarople; Wanda Sykes
- Cinematography: Greg Gardiner
- Edited by: Billy Weber; Matthew Feinman
- Music by: Moniker
- Production company: Nickelodeon Movies
- Distributed by: Netflix
- Release date: August 2, 2024
- Running time: 82 minutes
- Country: United States
- Language: English
- Budget: $100 million
- Box office: $4.4 million

Saving Bikini Bottom: The Sandy Cheeks Movie is a 2024 American adventure comedy film directed by Liza Johnson and written by Tom Stern and Kaz. Based on the animated television series SpongeBob SquarePants, created by Stephen Hillenburg, the film combines CGI animation with live-action and stars the series' regular voice cast and introduces new characters performed by Johnny Knoxville, Craig Robinson, Grey DeLisle, Ilia Isorelýs Paulino, Matty Cardarople, and Wanda Sykes. The plot follows Sandy and SpongeBob as they venture to Sandy's home state of Texas to save Bikini Bottom from an evil CEO. It is the first entry in a series of SpongeBob character spin-off films for Netflix, followed by Plankton: The Movie in 2025.

The film was first conceived during a pitching session for ideas for The SpongeBob Movie: Sponge on the Run (2020). In March 2020, ViacomCBS announced that it would be producing SpongeBob spin-off films for streaming television. In May 2021, a spin-off film starring Sandy was announced, with Johnson, Kaz, and Stern attached. Moniker composed the original score.

Prior to its release, the film was leaked on January 21, 2024, as a video upload on X. Saving Bikini Bottom: The Sandy Cheeks Movie was officially released on Netflix on August 2, 2024. The film debuted with 12.8 million views during its premiere weekend, making it Netflix's most-watched title of the week and received mixed reviews from critics.

== Plot ==
B.O.O.T.S. (Bureau Of Official Texas Science) Laboratory in Galveston, Texas, where Sandy Cheeks works, scoops Bikini Bottom and its inhabitants out of the ocean. Confused about their possible motives, Sandy and SpongeBob SquarePants go to the surface to return Bikini Bottom to the ocean floor, but are blown off course by a tornado after hitching a ride on an airplane to reach B.O.O.T.S.

At B.O.O.T.S., Mr. Krabs goes outside to see what is going on and is surprised to see a human woman; Phoebe, one of Sandy's closest colleagues at B.O.O.T.S. along with Kyle. After discovering that Sandy and SpongeBob were not captured, Sue Nahmee, the new head of B.O.O.T.S., demands that they capture them as soon as possible.

During a fight with a gang of rattlesnakes, one of them bites Sandy and she calls upon her family, who work as a traveling circus act, for help, and they agree to bring them to B.O.O.T.S. At B.O.O.T.S., Sue explains her plan to genetically modify the people of Bikini Bottom to breathe air and then clone them to sell as toy pets, experimenting on Mr. Krabs, Squidward and Patrick to test how well children will enjoy playing with them.

While Sandy's brother, Randy, shows SpongeBob how to do the Cheeks family whistle, the family gets into a car chase with the police because Randy used their van to illegally smuggle nuts. While they fend them off with the tornado, it does not work; as a last resort, SpongeBob and Sandy are launched out of a cannon to B.O.O.T.S. At the water park, Cuda, Sue Nahmee's pet pug, pursues them into the sewers, which leads to B.O.O.T.S. Sandy learns of Sue's plans and tries to attack her, but Sue puts her in a cage with a hamster wheel while SpongeBob is put on a roller coaster ride leading to the cloning chamber. Sue then rips off her lab outfit, revealing her to have a cyborg body. She explains that she was motivated by the desire to cuddle with fish, which she could not do because fish die when out of water. She also reveals that she used Sandy's life in Bikini Bottom to spy on its inhabitants. As the others express their disappointment in Sandy, SpongeBob arrives in the cloning chamber and is popped and divided into thousands of tiny versions of himself.

One of the tiny SpongeBobs motivates Sandy, telling her not to give up on saving Bikini Bottom. Sandy escapes from the cage and confronts Sue, who is defeated after she is decapitated and her head is fed to her pet fish, though Sue instead merges with the fish and quickly accepts her new lifestyle. Mr. Krabs discovers that fusing the tiny SpongeBobs together will return SpongeBob to normal, and he, Squidward, and Patrick work together to bring him back. However, the stand holding the glass orb containing Bikini Bottom gives way under the orb's weight, cracking the orb and causing the water to begin leaking out. Sandy tries to call her family for help using the whistle, but is unable to because she lost a tooth while fighting Sue. Having learned the whistle himself, SpongeBob calls upon them to help rig a mechanism to launch Bikini Bottom back into the ocean before all of the water is lost. With Bikini Bottom back in place, everyone celebrates by having the Cheeks family circus perform at the Krusty Krab, by singing a song.

== Cast ==
=== Voices ===
- Carolyn Lawrence as:
  - Sandy Cheeks
  - Bottomite crowd member
- Tom Kenny as:
  - SpongeBob SquarePants
  - Gary the Snail
  - Sonny
  - Lil' Frito
  - Various
- Mr. Lawrence as:
  - Plankton
  - Larry the Lobster
  - Fred
  - Plankton Lincoln
  - Various
- Mary Jo Catlett as Mrs. Puff
- Clancy Brown as:
  - Mr. Krabs
  - Clyde
  - Various
- Bill Fagerbakke as:
  - Patrick Star
  - Various
- Rodger Bumpass as:
  - Squidward Tentacles
  - Butch
  - Various
- Dee Bradley Baker as:
  - Cuda
  - Video Voice
  - Various
- Jill Talley as Karen and various
- Craig Robinson as Pa Cheeks
- Grey DeLisle as:
  - Ma Cheeks
  - Granny Cheeks
  - Rowdy Cheeks
  - Rosie Cheeks
- Johnny Knoxville as Randy Cheeks
- Kari Wahlgren as SeaPals Kid

=== Live-action actors ===
- Wanda Sykes as Sue Nahmee
  - Jamaria Davis as young Sue Nahmee's body
- Ilia Isorelýs Paulino as Phoebe
- Matty Cardarople as Kyle
- Christopher Hagen, Rio Alexander and Ryan Begay as Cowboys
- Jersey Johnston as Girl
- Miles Hall as Boy

== Production ==
=== Conception and development ===
Executive producer Marc Ceccarelli pitched Saving Bikini Bottom: The Sandy Cheeks Movie during a 2018 session of pitching ideas for The SpongeBob Movie: Sponge on the Run (2020). The idea was initially rejected, but a few years later, when the team wanted to do a Sandy Cheeks-centric story, he brought it back up and it was put into development. Director Liza Johnson was a newcomer to the world of animation. She was hired to direct the film because of her work on a season 2 episode of What We Do in the Shadows, "The Curse", which had Ceccarelli's favorite joke in the series. Carolyn Lawrence, the voice actor of Sandy, had heard whispers at work of a Sandy-related project in the works and described herself as being in shock when she received a phone call confirming it. Lawrence praised Johnson's vision for the film and immediately loved the script.

In March 2020, it was reported that ViacomCBS would be producing two spin-off films based on the series SpongeBob SquarePants for Netflix. In May 2021, a spin-off film with Sandy as its lead character was announced to be in development from Nickelodeon for streaming television, to be directed by Johnson from a script written by Kaz and Tom J. Stern and described as a hybrid feature that will put the animated title character into a live-action setting. In August 2021, it was revealed that plans to film Saving Bikini Bottom in Los Alamos were scrapped due to rewrites of the script.

In February 2022, during an investor call, Nickelodeon CEO Brian Robbins said that three SpongeBob character-driven spin-off films were in the works and that they would release exclusively on streamer Paramount+, with the first one premiering in 2023. However, in April 2023, it was reported that Saving Bikini Bottom would instead debut on Netflix in 2024, in consistence with Nickelodeon's previous deal with Netflix. That same month, in addition to a first-look reveal, it was revealed that Wanda Sykes, Johnny Knoxville, Craig Robinson, Grey DeLisle, Ilia Isorelýs Paulino, and Matty Cardarople were part of the cast. Series regulars Carolyn Lawrence, Tom Kenny, Clancy Brown, Bill Fagerbakke, Mr. Lawrence, and Rodger Bumpass were also confirmed to reprise their roles.

=== Filming, visual effects and animation ===
Greg Gardiner served as the film's cinematographer for its live-action scenes. Animation was provided by Pipeline Studios and Sinking Ship Entertainment in Ontario, Canada. Spin VFX in Ontario and ReDefine Animation in Montreal, Quebec, completed the live-action VFX parts of the film. Johnson started work early on to storyboard the entire film and together with animation supervisor, Piero Piluso, create an integrated look for the mix of live-action and animation. As a newcomer to animation, Johnson felt the process was a learning experience for both parties. The combination of the new animation style, story requirements, and technical and budget limitations were factors in deciding how scenes would look to make certain "that everything that people love and care about each character is still present, even though we're doing it in new conditions".

== Music ==
Moniker composed its original score. The film's soundtrack album was released by Lakeshore Records on August 2, 2024, the same day as the film. It features the Sandy Cheeks Theme based on the SpongeBob SquarePants theme, and performed by Tami Neilson. Additional original songs were written by Neilson, Linda Perry, Kaz, Jacques Brautbar, and Chantal Claret.

== Release and reception ==
=== Viewership and box office ===
Prior to its release, the entire film was leaked on January 21, 2024, as a video upload on X. Saving Bikini Bottom was released officially on Netflix on August 2, 2024. It debuted with 12.8 million views over its premiere weekend, making it Netflix's most-watched title and most-watched film of that week and outpacing non-exclusive contemporaries on the streamer like Paw Patrol: The Mighty Movie and Trolls Band Together (both 2023). In the following week ending on August 11, the film garnered 13.4 million views, an increase from its debut, making it the number one overall title and the top film on the English-language film chart. In China, the film was theatrically released on October 18, 2024, where it was distributed by China Film Group Corporation. It would go on to gross $4.4 million.

=== Critical response ===
On the review aggregator website Rotten Tomatoes, 50% of 20 critics' reviews are positive, with an average rating of 4.9/10. Catherine Bray of The Guardian gave the film a three out of five star rating. She appreciated the film's "admirably nuanced view of science", enjoying its depiction of how science can be used both positively and negatively. Bray also noted that the film prioritized entertainment rather than realism, feeling it would satisfy its intended audience demographic while praising Sykes' performance. Writing for Variety, Peter Debruge enjoyed the film's development of Sandy's backstory and "inventive ways" of combining animation and live-action. However, he also wrote that Sykes' interactions with animated characters felt "awkward". Adam Graham of The Detroit News gave the film a C grade. He opined that though it retained the series' humor, it did not feel cohesive and particularly disliked the film's focus on its new characters, which he felt distracted from the "SpongeBob mainstays", including Squidward and Patrick. Graham felt the lab scenes were "static and stuffy", and ultimately called the film "so-so". Similarly, Barry Levitt from The Daily Beast also disliked the film's focus on new characters, perceiving them to be underdeveloped and concluding that it failed to further develop Sandy's character. When discussing the script, he felt Sue Nahmee's plan and its importance to the plot was to the film's detriment as he thought it was underdeveloped and wished the film "fully commits" to the "gonzo madness" of SpongeBob. While he enjoyed the character design of Sandy's family, he disliked the "jarring" designs of the Bikini Bottom crew, lack of emotive expressions, and flashbacks of Nahmee's character. Jonathan Bellony of Trill Mag gave the film a negative review calling it "ugly" and opined that it is "the worst installment in the franchise to date" citing the film's "lack of imagination" and described it as "uninspired, boring and insanely idiotic". Brogan Luke Bouwhuis of In Between Drafts rated the film a 4/10, citing the film "feels like an act of desperation" while also stating that "everything else is a slog" and citing its "uninteresting jokes and even worse animation".

=== Accolades ===
Award	Date of ceremony	Category	Recipient(s)	Result	Ref.
Hollywood Professional Association Awards	November 7, 2024	HPA Award for Outstanding Color Grading – Animated Episode or Non-Theatrical Feature	Alastor Pan Arnold (Keep Me Posted)	Nominated	
Annie Awards	February 8, 2025	Outstanding Achievement for Storyboarding in an Animated Feature Production	Piero Piluso	Nominated	
