= SpongeBob SquarePants (film series) =

SpongeBob SquarePants films
- Film collection for the series containing the first four installments
- Based on: SpongeBob SquarePants by Stephen Hillenburg
- Distributed by: Paramount Pictures (theatrical); Paramount+ (3rd film); Netflix (spin-off films)
- Running time: 542 minutes
- Country: United States
- Language: English
- Budget: $228 million (Total of 4 films)
- Box office: $641.2 million (Total of 6 films)

SpongeBob SquarePants is a series of live-action animated and animated adventure comedy films based on the Nickelodeon animated television series of the same name. The films are produced by Nickelodeon Movies and distributed by Paramount Pictures. The films feature the regular television voice cast Tom Kenny, Bill Fagerbakke, Rodger Bumpass, Clancy Brown, Mr. Lawrence, Jill Talley, Carolyn Lawrence, Mary Jo Catlett, and Lori Alan.

Plans for a film based on the series began in 2001 when Paramount Pictures began approaching series creator Stephen Hillenburg for a theatrical feature. He initially refused their offers, but began developing it in 2002 upon completion of the show's third season. Hillenburg directed the film, titled The SpongeBob SquarePants Movie, which was theatrically released in the United States on November 19, 2004, to critical and commercial success, and was originally planned to act as the series finale prior to the production of more episodes. Sponge Out of Water, directed by Paul Tibbitt, followed in 2015. A third film, Sponge on the Run, was directed by Tim Hill and released in 2020.

As of February 2022, four additional films were announced to be in development, including a fourth theatrical film, titled The SpongeBob Movie: Search for SquarePants, which was released in December 2025, and three spin-off films being developed for streaming release on Netflix and Paramount+.

== Films ==
| Title | U.S. release date | Director(s) | Screenwriter(s) | Story by | Producer(s) | Animation services |
Main series
| The SpongeBob SquarePants Movie | November 19, 2004 | Stephen Hillenburg | Derek Drymon, Tim Hill, Stephen Hillenburg, Kent Osborne, Aaron Springer & Paul Tibbitt | Stephen Hillenburg | Stephen Hillenburg and Julia Pistor | Rough Draft Studios, Korea; Tony Gardner, Inc. Warner Bros. Animation |
| The SpongeBob Movie: Sponge Out of Water | February 6, 2015 | Paul Tibbitt | Jonathan Aibel & Glenn Berger | Stephen Hillenburg & Paul Tibbitt | Paul Tibbitt and Mary Parent | Rough Draft Studios, Korea (2D animation); Iloura VFX (3D animation) |
| The SpongeBob Movie: Sponge on the Run | March 4, 2021 | Tim Hill | | Tim Hill and Jonathan Aibel & Glenn Berger | Ryan Harris | Mikros Image |
| The SpongeBob Movie: Search for SquarePants | December 19, 2025 | Derek Drymon | Pam Brady & Matt Lieberman | Marc Ceccarelli, Kaz & Pam Brady | Pam Brady, Lisa Stewart and Aaron Dem | Reel FX Animation; Fuse FX; Cinesite |
Netflix spin-off films
| Saving Bikini Bottom: The Sandy Cheeks Movie | August 2, 2024 | Liza Johnson | Kaz & Tom Stern | Kaz | Robert Engleman | Nickelodeon Animation Studio; Sinking Ship Entertainment; Pipeline Studios; Spin VFX; ReDefine Animation |
| Plankton: The Movie | March 7, 2025 | Dave Needham | Kaz, Chris Viscardi, & Mr. Lawrence | Mr. Lawrence | Marc Ceccarelli and Vincent Waller | Nickelodeon Animation Studio; Mikros Animation; ReDefine; Animation Yukfoo Animation; McBess Studios |

== Main series ==
=== The SpongeBob SquarePants Movie (2004) ===
In this animated comedy, Plankton's plan is to steal King Neptune's crown and send it to the dangerous Shell City, and then frame Mr. Krabs for the crime. SpongeBob and Patrick must journey to Shell City while facing several perils along the way to retrieve the crown to save Mr. Krabs from Neptune's wrath and Bikini Bottom from Plankton's tyranny.

=== The SpongeBob Movie: Sponge Out of Water (2015) ===
The plot follows a pirate named Burger Beard (Antonio Banderas), who steals the Krabby Patty secret formula using a magical book that makes any text written upon it come true. After Bikini Bottom turns into an apocalyptic cesspool and the citizens turn against SpongeBob, he must team up with Plankton to find the formula and save Bikini Bottom. Later, SpongeBob, Patrick, Squidward, Mr. Krabs, Sandy and Plankton must travel to the surface to confront Burger Beard and get the formula back before Bikini Bottom is completely destroyed.

=== The SpongeBob Movie: Sponge on the Run (2020) ===
The film centers on SpongeBob and Patrick traveling to the underwater Atlantic City to save Gary from King Poseidon. During the adventure, SpongeBob's friends reflect on them first meeting him at Kamp Koral. The film showcases stylized 3D animation, with most of the movie presented in full CGI and some parts featuring 3D characters interacting with live-action environments, all animated by Mikros Animation.

On January 23, 2019, it was confirmed that production on the film had officially begun. Due to the COVID-19 pandemic, the film released in Canadian theaters on August 14, 2020, followed by a limited video on demand release and Paramount+ release on March 4, 2021. The film was directed by Tim Hill, who also wrote the screenplay with Michael Kvamme from a story by Aaron Springer, Jonathan Aibel and Glenn Berger. The show's principal voice actors—Tom Kenny, Bill Fagerbakke, Rodger Bumpass, Clancy Brown, Mr. Lawrence, Jill Talley, Carolyn Lawrence, Mary Jo Catlett and Lori Alan— reprised their roles.

=== The SpongeBob Movie: Search for SquarePants (2025) ===
A fourth theatrical SpongeBob film was officially confirmed to be in development in February 2022. The film initially began development as a direct-to-streaming film focused on Mr. Krabs. In April 2023, during Paramount Pictures' CinemaCon panel, it was announced that the film would be titled The SpongeBob Movie: Search for SquarePants, with series veteran Derek Drymon set to direct the film. In April 2024, it was reported that the show's regular voice cast of Tom Kenny, Clancy Brown, Rodger Bumpass, Bill Fagerbakke, Carolyn Lawrence, and Mr. Lawrence would reprise their roles. In July, Mark Hamill revealed that he would be voicing The Flying Dutchman, replacing long-time voice actor Brian Doyle-Murray. Pam Brady and Lisa Stewart would serve as producers. It was released in theaters on December 19, 2025.

== Spin-off films ==
=== Saving Bikini Bottom: The Sandy Cheeks Movie (2024) ===
In the film, when Bikini Bottom is suddenly scooped out of the ocean, Sandy Cheeks and SpongeBob SquarePants journey to Sandy's home state of Texas, where they meet Sandy's family and must save Bikini Bottom from the hands of an evil CEO. It is the first in a series of SpongeBob character spin-off films. The film was directed by Liza Johnson, and written by Tom Stern and Kaz. It stars the series' regular voice cast alongside guest stars Johnny Knoxville, Craig Robinson, Grey DeLisle, Ilia Isorelýs Paulino, Matty Cardarople, and Wanda Sykes in new roles. It was released on Netflix on August 2, 2024.

=== Plankton: The Movie (2025) ===
In June 2024, it was announced that a second SpongeBob spin-off film, following Saving Bikini Bottom: The Sandy Cheeks Movie, was in production. Titled Plankton: The Movie, the film would feature Plankton as its lead character and Karen as the villain. The series' regular voice cast reprised their roles. Dave Needham acted as the film's director, with Mr. Lawrence co-writing the film, alongside Kaz and Chris Viscardi. The film was released on Netflix on March 7, 2025.

=== Untitled spin-off film ===
A third character-focused spin-off film is in development with an intended release on Netflix.

== Short film ==
The film centers on SpongeBob during one of his shifts at the Krusty Krab, in which he overuses the restaurant's order up bell, much to the dismay of his irritable co-worker, Squidward. Order Up was produced by Nickelodeon Animation Studio in 2011-12 but remained unreleased for several years. It was directed by Sean Charmatz, who served as a storyboard director, writer, and artist on the main SpongeBob SquarePants television series. Charmatz co-wrote it with series veteran and former showrunner, Paul Tibbitt. Tibbitt and series creator Stephen Hillenburg were executive producers, and Jennie Monica Hammond is producer. It released in theaters on July 18, 2025, alongside screenings of Smurfs.

== Cast and characters ==
List indicators

This section includes characters who will appear or have appeared in the franchise.

- An empty grey cell indicates the character was not in the film, or that the character's official presence has not yet been confirmed.
- ^{E} indicates an appearance not included in the theatrical cut.
- ^{Y} indicates a younger version of the character.

| Characters | Main SpongeBob films | | | | Spin-off films | |
| Characters | The SpongeBob SquarePants Movie | The SpongeBob Movie: Sponge Out of Water | The SpongeBob Movie: Sponge on the Run | The SpongeBob Movie: Search for SquarePants | Saving Bikini Bottom: The Sandy Cheeks Movie | Plankton: The Movie |
|---|---|---|---|---|---|---|
| SpongeBob SquarePants | Tom Kenny | Tom Kenny | Tom Kenny Antonio Raul Corbo^{Y} | Tom Kenny | Tom Kenny | Tom Kenny |
| Patrick Star | Bill Fagerbakke | Bill Fagerbakke | Bill Fagerbakke Jack Gore^{Y} | Bill Fagerbakke | Bill Fagerbakke | Bill Fagerbakke |
| Squidward Tentacles | Rodger Bumpass | Rodger Bumpass | Rodger Bumpass Jason Maybaum^{Y} | Rodger Bumpass | Rodger Bumpass | Rodger Bumpass |
| Mr. Eugene Krabs | Clancy Brown | Clancy Brown | Clancy Brown | Clancy Brown | Clancy Brown | Clancy Brown |
| Sheldon Plankton | Mr. Lawrence | Mr. Lawrence | Mr. Lawrence | Mr. Lawrence | Mr. Lawrence | Mr. Lawrence |
| Sandy Cheeks | Carolyn Lawrence | Carolyn Lawrence | Carolyn Lawrence Presley Williams^{Y} | Carolyn Lawrence | Carolyn Lawrence | Carolyn Lawrence |
| Karen Plankton | Jill Talley | Jill Talley | Jill Talley | | Jill Talley | Jill Talley |
| Mrs. Puff | Mary Jo Catlett | Mary Jo Catlett | Mary Jo Catlett | Non-speaking cameo | Mary Jo Catlett | Mary Jo Catlett |
| Pearl Krabs | Lori Alan | Lori Alan | Lori Alan^{E} | | Non-speaking cameo | Lori Alan |
| Gary the Snail | Tom Kenny | Tom Kenny | Tom Kenny | Tom Kenny | Tom Kenny | Tom Kenny |
| The Cyclops | Aaron Hendry Neil Ross | | | | | |
| Dennis | Alec Baldwin | | | | | |
| David Hasselhoff | Himself | | | | | |
| Princess Mindy | Scarlett Johansson | | | | | |
| King Neptune | Jeffrey Tambor | | | | | |
| Perch Perkins | Dee Bradley Baker | Dee Bradley Baker | Dee Bradley Baker | | | Dee Bradley Baker |
| Victor | Thomas F. Wilson | | | | | |
| Burger Beard | | Antonio Banderas | | | | |
| Bubbles | | Matt Berry | | | | |
| Chancellor | | | Reggie Watts | | | |
| Otto | | | Awkwafina | | | |
| King Poseidon | | | Matt Berry | | | |
| Sage | | | Keanu Reeves | | | |
| The Flying Dutchman | | | | Mark Hamill | | |
| Barb | | | | Regina Hall | | |
| Granny Cheeks | | | | | Grey DeLisle | |
| Ma Cheeks | | | | | Grey DeLisle | |
| Pa Cheeks | | | | | Craig Robinson | |
| Randy Cheeks | | | | | Johnny Knoxville | |
| Rosie Cheeks | | | | | Grey DeLisle | |
| Rowdy Cheeks | | | | | Grey DeLisle | |
| Kyle | | | | | Matty Cardarople | |
| Sue Nahmee | | | | | Wanda Sykes Jamaria Davis^{Y} | |
| Phoebe | | | | | Ilia Isorelýs Paulino | |

- A dark grey cell indicates that the character does not appear in the film.

== Production ==
=== The SpongeBob SquarePants Movie ===
Nickelodeon and Paramount Pictures had approached SpongeBob SquarePants creator Stephen Hillenburg for a film based on the show as early as 2001, but he refused for more than a year. He was concerned, after watching The Iron Giant and Toy Story with his son, about the challenge of SpongeBob and Patrick doing something more cinematically consequential and inspiring without losing what he called the SpongeBob "cadence". He said, on a break from season four post-production, that the film's story "had to be SpongeBob in a great adventure. That's where the comedy's coming from, having these two naïve characters, SpongeBob and Patrick, a doofus and an idiot, on this incredibly dangerous heroic odyssey with all the odds against them." The writers decided to write a mythical hero's quest for the 2004 film: the search for a stolen crown, which brings SpongeBob and Patrick to the surface. Of the plot, Bill Fagerbakke said that he was "continually dazzled and delighted with what [the show's staff] came up with."

Production on the first film began in 2002 after Hillenburg and the show's staff completed the third season. The announcement of the film being in production had the film's staff create a joke plot which stated that it would feature SpongeBob rescuing Patrick from a fisherman in Florida, which was intended as a humorous reference to Finding Nemo. Tom Kenny later clarified that the joke plot was meant to "keep fans busy" while the film was in production. Hillenburg wrote the film with five other writer-animators from the show (Paul Tibbitt, Derek Drymon, Aaron Springer, Kent Osborne and Tim Hill) over a three-month period in a room of a former Glendale, California, bank, and also directed and produced the film.

The first film was intended to be the series finale; Hillenburg wanted to end the franchise after the movie was completed so it "wouldn't jump the shark", citing conerns from Nickelodeon executives that the show "had peaked". However, the franchise's growing popularity meant that Nickelodeon could not afford to do such. As a result, Hillenburg resigned as the series' showrunner, appointing writer, director, and storyboard artist Paul Tibbitt to succeed him. Hillenburg still remained involved with the series, reviewing each episode and submitting suggestions.

=== The SpongeBob Movie: Sponge Out of Water ===
In 2010, The New York Times reported that Nickelodeon had approached the show's crew to make a second film. The network hoped to give itself and the global franchise "a boost" by releasing another film. The Los Angeles Times reported that Paramount had "another SpongeBob picture" in development in March 2011. Philippe Dauman, then president and CEO of Paramount and Viacom, announced on February 28, 2012, that a sequel film was in development and slated for a late 2014 release. Dauman added that the film "will serve to start off or be one of our films that starts off our new animation effort." Nickelodeon expected the film to do much better in foreign box office than the 2004 feature, given its increasingly global reach. Stephen Hillenburg returned to contribute to the story of the film and act as the film's executive producer.

=== The SpongeBob Movie: Sponge on the Run ===
In a February 2015 interview discussing The SpongeBob Movie: Sponge Out of Water's success at the box office, Megan Colligan, president of worldwide distribution and marketing at Paramount Pictures, stated the possibility of a third film was "a good bet." In another interview, Paramount vice-chairman Rob Moore remarked, "Hopefully, it won't take 10 years to make another film," in reference to the time passed between The SpongeBob SquarePants Movie (2004) and its 2015 sequel. Later in 2015, it was revealed that Paramount was developing sequels to its franchises, including another SpongeBob film.

The film was initially scheduled for release theatrically in 2019, before being delayed to 2020. The film later had its theatrical run cancelled due to the COVID-19 pandemic and instead released on video on demand and Paramount+. The film had an exclusive theatrical run in Canada on August 14, 2020, and premiered on Netflix three months later in international countries. By January 2016, Jonathan Aibel and Glenn Berger had been hired to write the film. In April 2018, the film's official title was revealed as The SpongeBob Movie: It's a Wonderful Sponge, and SpongeBob co-developer Tim Hill was announced as director and writer for the film. On November 12, 2019, it was revealed that the film's title was changed from It's a Wonderful Sponge to Sponge on the Run.

=== Saving Bikini Bottom: The Sandy Cheeks Movie ===
In March 2020, it was reported that ViacomCBS would be producing two spin-off films based on the series SpongeBob SquarePants for Netflix. In May 2021, a spin-off film with Sandy Cheeks as its lead character was announced to be in development from Nickelodeon for streaming television, to be directed by Liza Johnson from a script written by Kaz and Tom J. Stern and described as a hybrid feature that will put the animated title character into a live-action setting. In August 2021, it was revealed that plans to film Saving Bikini Bottom in Los Alamos were scrapped due to rewrites of the script. In February 2022, during its investor call, Nickelodeon CEO Brian Robbins said that they would be working on the three character-driven spin-off films and would release them exclusively on its streamer Paramount+, with the first one premiering in 2023. However, in April 2023, it was reported that Saving Bikini Bottom would instead debut on Netflix in 2024.

== Reception ==
=== Box office performance ===
| Film | Release date | Box office | | | | Budget | Ref. |
| Film | Release date | Opening weekend North America | North America | Other territories | Worldwide | Budget | Ref. |
|---|---|---|---|---|---|---|---|
| The SpongeBob SquarePants Movie | November 19, 2004 | $32,018,216 | $85,417,988 | $54,775,005 | $140,192,993 | $30 million | |
| The SpongeBob Movie: Sponge Out of Water | February 6, 2015 | $55,365,012 | $162,994,032 | $162,192,000 | $325,186,032 | $74 million | |
| The SpongeBob Movie: Sponge on the Run | August 14, 2020 | $865,824 | $4,810,790 | —N/a | $4,810,790 | $60 million | |
| The SpongeBob Movie: Search for SquarePants | December 19, 2025 | $15,611,344 | $71,047,872 | $94,400,000 | $165,447,872 | $64 million | |
| Saving Bikini Bottom: The Sandy Cheeks Movie | October 18, 2024 | —N/a | —N/a | $4,060,547 | $4,060,547 | —N/a | |
| Plankton: The Movie | March 8, 2025 | —N/a | —N/a | $1,570,403 | $1,570,403 | —N/a | |
| Total | | $103,860,396 | $324,270,682 | $316,997,955 | $641,268,637 | $228 million | |

=== Critical and public reception ===
| Film | Critical | | Public |
| Film | Rotten Tomatoes | Metacritic | CinemaScore |
|---|---|---|---|
| The SpongeBob SquarePants Movie | 68% (124 reviews) | 67 (32 reviews) | B+ |
| The SpongeBob Movie: Sponge Out of Water | 80% (102 reviews) | 62 (27 reviews) | B |
| The SpongeBob Movie: Sponge on the Run | 66% (74 reviews) | 65 (20 reviews) | —N/a |
| The SpongeBob Movie: Search for SquarePants | 79% (72 reviews) | 65 (17 reviews) | A– |
| Saving Bikini Bottom: The Sandy Cheeks Movie | 50% (20 reviews) | —N/a | —N/a |
| Plankton: The Movie | 71% (14 reviews) | 61 (5 reviews) | —N/a |

== Additional crew and production details ==
| Title | Crew/Detail | | | | | |
| Title | Composer(s) | Cinematographer | Editor(s) | Production companies | Distributing company | Running time |
|---|---|---|---|---|---|---|
| The SpongeBob SquarePants Movie | Gregor Narholz | Jerzy Zieliński | Lynn Hobson | Nickelodeon Movies, United Plankton Pictures | Paramount Pictures | 87 minutes |
| The SpongeBob Movie: Sponge Out of Water | John Debney | Phil Méheux | David Ian Salter | Paramount Animation, Nickelodeon Movies, United Plankton Pictures | Paramount Pictures | 92 minutes |
| The SpongeBob Movie: Sponge on the Run | Hans Zimmer & Steve Mazzaro | Peter Lyons Collister | Michael W. Andrews | Paramount Animation, Nickelodeon Movies, United Plankton Pictures, MRC | Paramount Pictures (Canada); Paramount+ (USA) | 92 minutes |
| Saving Bikini Bottom: The Sandy Cheeks Movie | Moniker | Greg Gardiner | Billy Weber, Matthew Feinman | Nickelodeon Movies | Netflix | 87 minutes |
| Plankton: The Movie | Mahuia Bridgman-Cooper | TBA | Lisa Linder Silver | Nickelodeon Movies | Netflix | 88 minutes |
| The SpongeBob Movie: Search for SquarePants | John Debney | Peter Lyons Collister | Wyatt Jones | Paramount Animation, Nickelodeon Movies, MRC | Paramount Pictures | 96 minutes |
