= The SpongeBob Movie: Sponge Out of Water =

2015 film by Paul Tibbitt

- Theatrical release poster
- Directed by: Paul Tibbitt (Note: Tibbitt directed the animation sequences, while Mike Mitchell directed the live-action sequences)
- Screenplay by: Jonathan Aibel Glenn Berger
- Story by: Stephen Hillenburg; Paul Tibbitt
- Based on: SpongeBob SquarePants by Stephen Hillenburg
- Produced by: Paul Tibbitt; Mary Parent
- Starring: Antonio Banderas; Tom Kenny; Clancy Brown; Rodger Bumpass; Bill Fagerbakke; Carolyn Lawrence; Mr. Lawrence; Matt Berry
- Cinematography: Phil Méheux
- Edited by: David Ian Salter
- Music by: John Debney
- Production companies: Paramount Animation; Nickelodeon Movies; United Plankton Pictures
- Distributed by: Paramount Pictures
- Release dates: January 28, 2015 (Belgium); February 6, 2015 (United States)
- Running time: 92 minutes
- Country: United States
- Language: English
- Budget: $74 million
- Box office: $325.2 million

The SpongeBob Movie: Sponge Out of Water is a 2015 American adventure comedy film directed by Paul Tibbitt and based on the television series SpongeBob SquarePants. The live-action animated film stars the series' regular voice cast alongside Antonio Banderas in a live-action role and Matt Berry as a new character. In the film, SpongeBob and Plankton form an uneasy alliance to find the Krabby Patty secret formula after it mysteriously disappears and leads to their town, Bikini Bottom, devolving to chaos. The trail eventually leads SpongeBob and friends to the surface, where they confront Burger Beard, a pirate with a magical book that makes any text written upon it come true. It is the second theatrical film based on the series.

The film was written by Jonathan Aibel and Glenn Berger, adapted from a story by Tibbitt and SpongeBob creator Stephen Hillenburg. As with the first film, the final act places the animated characters in a live-action world. These scenes were directed by Mike Mitchell and were filmed in Savannah and Tybee Island, Georgia. Filming began in September 2013, and was completed in November that year. The film is dedicated to Ernest Borgnine, the voice of Mermaid Man, who died in 2012. It also features the final film role of Tim Conway, the voice of Barnacle Boy, who died in 2019.

The SpongeBob Movie: Sponge Out of Water was released in the United States on February 6, 2015, by Paramount Pictures. It received positive reviews from critics and was a commercial success, earning $325 million against its $74 million budget and becoming the highest-grossing film in the series. A third film, Sponge on the Run, was released in 2020, and a fourth, Search for SquarePants, was released in 2025.

== Plot ==
A pirate named Burger Beard travels to Bikini Atoll, where he obtains a magical book that can make any text written upon it real. The book tells the story of SpongeBob SquarePants and his adventures in the underwater city of Bikini Bottom. SpongeBob works for Mr. Krabs at the Krusty Krab fast food restaurant, where he cooks Krabby Patties. SpongeBob has spent several years protecting the secret formula of the Krabby Patty from Plankton, the owner of the rival Chum Bucket.

One day, Plankton attacks the Krusty Krab to steal the formula. After a battle involving giant foods and condiments, Plankton feigns surrender and uses a robotic decoy of himself to gain access to Krabs' vault. The real Plankton steals the formula, leaving a fake document in its place. SpongeBob catches Plankton and they fight over the formula, which abruptly disappears.

Without the secret formula, Krabby Patties can't be made, leaving customers ravenous. While Mr. Krabs suspects Plankton, SpongeBob knows he's innocent; they escape in a soap bubble. Bikini Bottom turns into a wasteland without Krabby Patties. A book page from a struggle between Burger Beard and seagulls lands on Sandy Cheeks' tree dome. SpongeBob suggests teaming up with Plankton to find the formula, and they decide to time travel just before it vanished. They build a machine and travel to the future, meeting Bubbles, a magical dolphin overseeing the galaxy, but they accidentally get him fired when Jupiter and Saturn collide. After escaping Bubbles, they retrieve the formula from the past, only to find it's a fake Plankton left earlier.

Sandy suggests a sacrifice to the "sandwich gods" for Krabby Patties, and SpongeBob volunteers. As the town tries, SpongeBob mentions he smells Krabby Patties, which Mr. Krabs also detects. The townsfolk follow the scent to the surface, and Bubbles returns, expressing his disdain for his job and gratitude to be fired. He thanks SpongeBob by allowing him and his friends to breathe on land to follow the smell.

The team lands on a beach and discovers that the smell leads to Burger Beard's ship, which he has converted into a food truck. Burger Beard is revealed to have stolen the formula using the magical book, which he then uses to banish the group to an island full of pelicans. SpongeBob uses the page Sandy had to transform himself and the others into superheroes. They return and find Burger Beard, who drives away with the formula, and give chase. The team destroys the book during the ensuing battle, but Burger Beard manages to overpower them.

Plankton, who has become a muscle-bound hero, attacks Burger Beard. With SpongeBob's help, they reclaim the formula and send Burger Beard flying to Bikini Atoll. Using the final page's magic, the gang returns to Bikini Bottom. With the Krabby Patties back, the city returns to normal, and Plankton resumes his business rivalry.

== Cast ==
- Antonio Banderas as Burger Beard
- Tom Kenny as SpongeBob SquarePants, Gary the Snail, and various
- Mr. Lawrence as Plankton and various
- Clancy Brown as Mr. Krabs
- Bill Fagerbakke as Patrick Star and various
- Rodger Bumpass as Squidward Tentacles and various
- Carolyn Lawrence as Sandy Cheeks
- Jill Talley as Karen and various
- Matt Berry as Bubbles
- Mary Jo Catlett as Mrs. Puff
- Lori Alan as Pearl Krabs
- Riki Lindhome and Kate Micucci of Garfunkel and Oates as the Popsicle twins
- Peter Shukoff (US version), Lloyd Ahlquist (US version), Carlos Alazraqui (US version), Eric Bauza (US version), Tim Conway (US version, one of his last films), Eddie Deezen (US version), Nolan North (US version), Rob Paulsen (US version), Kevin Michael Richardson (US version), April Stewart (US version), Cree Summer (US version), Billy West (US version), Alan Carr (UK version), Caspar Lee (UK version) and Stacey Solomon (UK version) as seagulls
- Paul Tibbitt (US), Joe Sugg (UK) and Robert Irwin (Australia) as Kyle the Seagull
- Dee Bradley Baker as Perch Perkins and various
- Thomas F. Wilson as an angry customer. Wilson previously voiced Victor the tough fish in The SpongeBob SquarePants Movie.
- Sirena Irwin as an automated voice and a mob member
- Mark Fite as a customer

In addition to playing some of the seagulls, Shukoff and Ahlquist also appear as two of Burger Beard's customers.

In a sequence deleted from the theatrical release, Slash makes a cameo appearance as a busker. His scene is briefly featured in a trailer, and is included among the special features for the Blu-ray release of the film.

== Production ==
=== Development ===
Following the release of The SpongeBob SquarePants Movie in 2004, producer Julia Pistor stated that a sequel film was unlikely despite its successful box office performance. In a 2009 interview with Digital Spy, former SpongeBob SquarePants writer and executive producer Paul Tibbitt was asked about the possibility of a sequel; he said, "I think that they are talking about doing that, but I haven't signed up for anything. We just feel like we've told so many stories, and SpongeBob exists so well in this short 11-minute form." He also stated that making another film was "a huge challenge". However, Tibbitt said a sequel is not impossible, saying "I wouldn't say no, but I don't know if there will be another one". In 2010, Nickelodeon was reportedly approaching the crews of the show to make another film adaptation. The network had long wanted to partner with sister company Paramount Pictures to release another SpongeBob SquarePants film to help reinvigorate the series' declining ratings. Internal disagreement delayed collaborations.

On March 4, 2011, the Los Angeles Times reported Paramount had "another SpongeBob picture" in development. In July the same year, Paramount formed its new animation unit, Paramount Animation, in the wake of the commercial and critical success of the 2011 animated film Rango and the end of the studio's distribution deal with DreamWorks Animation. Philippe Dauman, Viacom's then-president and CEO, officially announced on February 28, 2012, that a sequel film was in development and was due for an unspecified 2014 release. Dauman said the new film "will serve to start off or be one of our films that starts off our new animation effort". Nickelodeon expected the film to do much better in foreign box offices than the 2004 feature considering the channel's increasingly global reach.

Production was announced on June 10, 2012, under the title The SpongeBob SquarePants Movie 2, which some trade publications began referring to as SpongeBob SquarePants 2. Series creator Stephen Hillenburg, who left his role as the series' showrunner in 2004 following the release of The SpongeBob SquarePants Movie, would return as the film's executive producer and function as a co-writer for the film.

=== Casting ===
The main cast of the television series reprised their roles for The SpongeBob Movie: Sponge Out of Water. In August 2013, casting directors from Marty Siu Casting began casting calls for the background extras for the live-action scenes. On September 21, 2013, it was reported that Spanish actor Antonio Banderas had been cast for a live-action role as Burger Beard the pirate.

=== Animation ===
The 2D hand-drawn animated sequences for The SpongeBob Movie: Sponge Out of Water were done in South Korea by Rough Draft Studios Korea. As did its predecessor, the film combines traditional animation with live action, and also used computer-generated imagery (CGI), which was handled by Iloura VFX in Melbourne, Australia, to render the characters in 3D.

In a 2012 preview of upcoming Paramount films, The SpongeBob Movie: Sponge Out of Water was exhibited as a "3D feature film" with "CGI-like animation". Following the release of SpongeBob SquarePants 4-D: The Great Jelly Rescue (2013), a 3D short film that was released at the Nickelodeon Suites Resort Orlando, executives talked about continuing the use of 3D in the film.

The SpongeBob Movie: Sponge Out of Water contains a stop-motion sequence that was animated by Screen Novelties; the company had previously produced a clay animation scene for the first SpongeBob SquarePants film, the mixed-media opening of the television episode "Truth or Square", and the entirety of the stop-motion special It's a SpongeBob Christmas!.

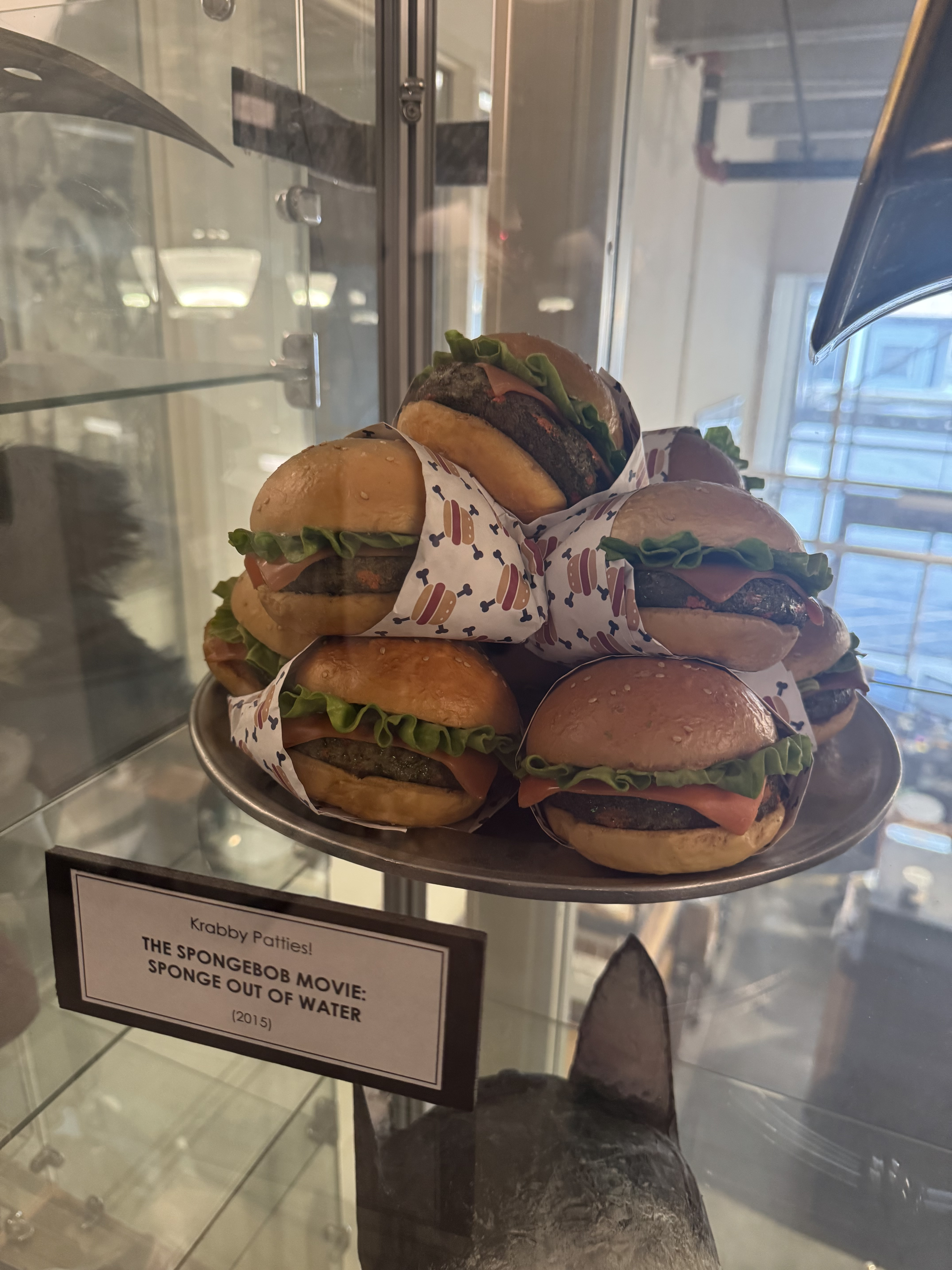
Prop Krabby Patties used in the film

In March 2014, Paramount screened live-action footage from the film during the National Association of Theatre Owners' event CinemaCon. News websites report that the film would be CGI-animated; an Internet Movie Database staff member commented; "When Paramount announced there would be a new SpongeBob SquarePants movie, the assumption was that it would be animated (like all other incarnations of SpongeBob). The very brief footage from tonight's presentation suggested otherwise – it looked as though this was a CGI/live-action hybrid akin to Alvin and the Chipmunks, Yogi Bear, The Smurfs, etc." In an article published by ComingSoon.net, author Edward Douglas said the film's CGI footage looks "weird". Philippe Dauman said the CGI elements are intended to "refresh and give another boost" to the characters.

=== Filming ===
The SpongeBob Movie: Sponge Out of Water includes live-action scenes that were directed by Mike Mitchell. Filming began on September 30, 2013, and finished on November 5 of the same year. Filming was done at multiple locations in Savannah and Tybee Island; both of which are in Georgia. On July 11, 2013, the Savannah Film Office announced the filming of live-action scenes in Savannah for 40 days. Will Hammargren, Savannah Film Office's location specialist, said the film was expected to contribute $8 million to the city's economy, including hotel bookings of at least 5,600 room nights.

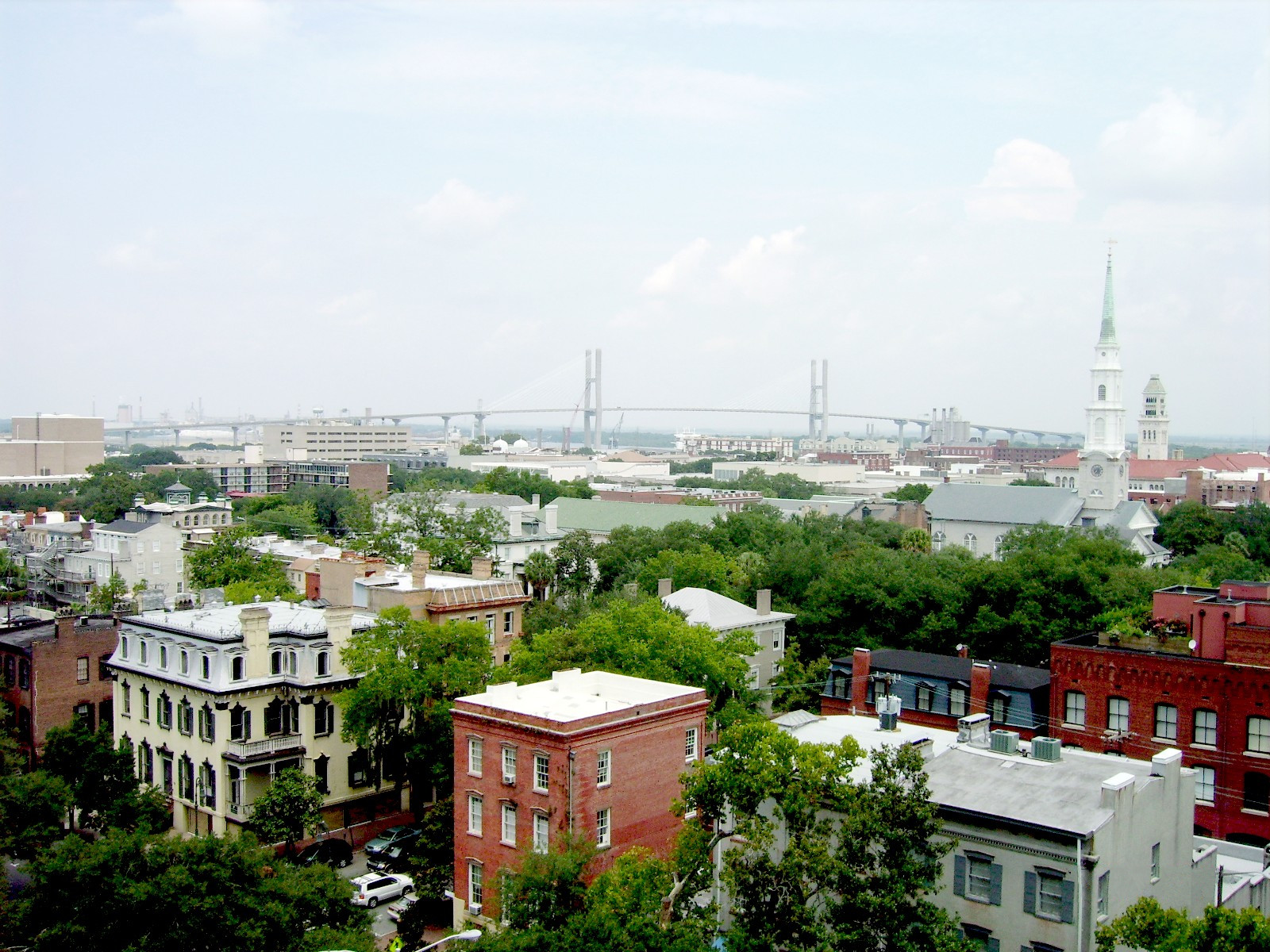
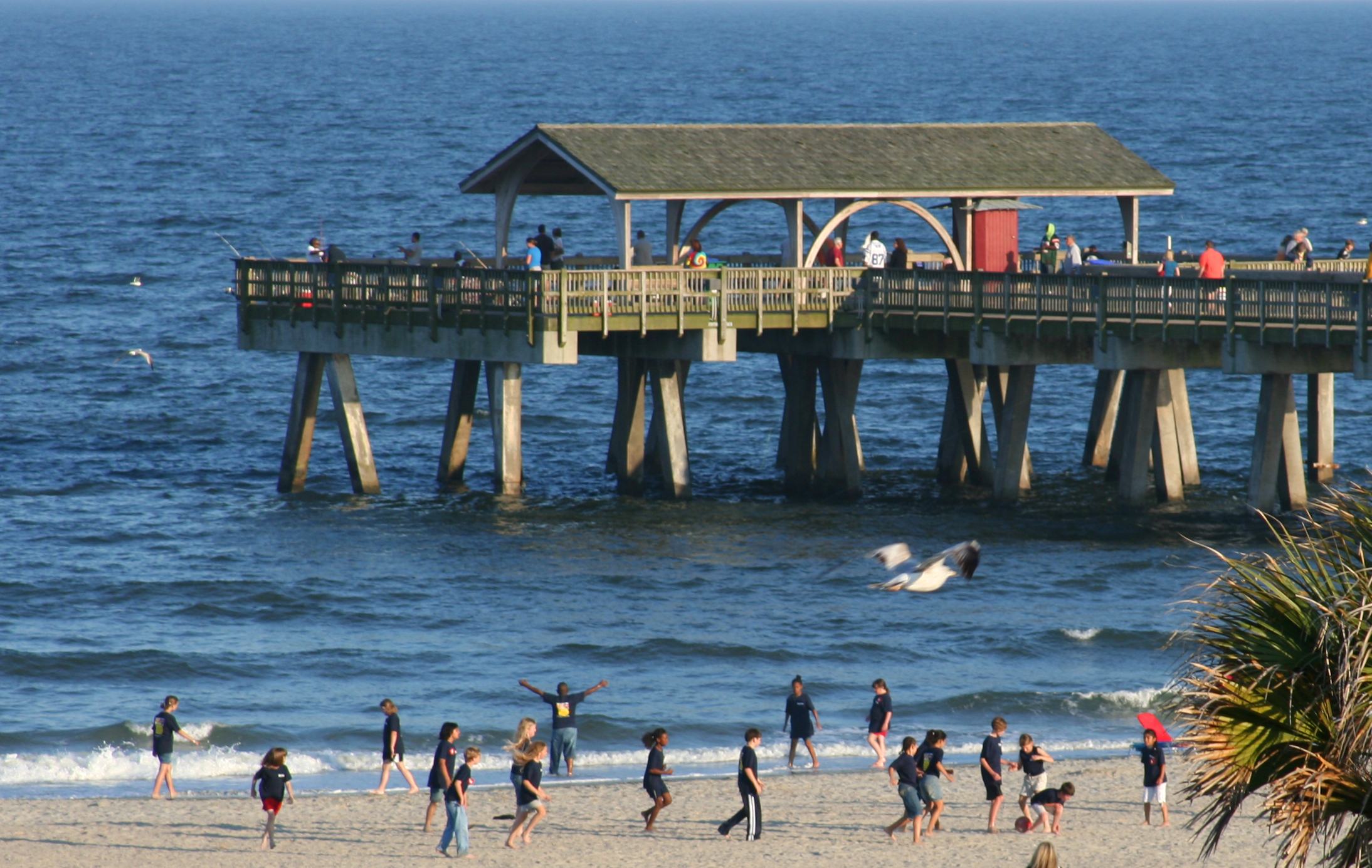
The film's live-action scenes were shot on various locations in Georgia, including downtown Savannah (top) and Tybee Island's Pier (bottom).

On September 30, 2013, the start of production filming was interrupted by the dismissal of film services director Jay Self. According to a memorandum from Joe Shearouse, bureau chief of the leisure services department of Savannah, Self was fired for his "failure to properly plan and manage the arrangement for the movie". The memo accused Self of shortcomings surrounding the filming and also cited complaints from residents of Savannah. Another reported reason for Self's dismissal was a disagreement between Paramount and the Savannah Film Office about the process of negotiating compensation for local businesses with Paramount to cover losses of trade during filming.

To prepare the filming location in the downtown Savannah, the film crew painted storefronts along Broughton Street to resemble a coastal community called "Salty Shoals". Savannah College of Art and Design's Jen Library and Trustees Theater was converted into a maritime museum. In August 2013, Paramount approached SCAD to use the Jen Library for a scene. The studio's art department transformed the building; it remained open to students during filming. Self said, "The changes are temporary with all buildings scheduled to be restored to their original colors after filming is complete".

Filming in downtown Savannah began on October 9; parts of Broughton Street were closed until October 18. Antonio Banderas was filmed on a pirate ship with wheels for a car-chase scene. At one point, a film-crew member caused an accident that damaged a downtown building and a woman was taken to a hospital.

Filming in the city ended on October 18, when a raffle was also held; the prizes included a SpongeBob SquarePants-themed party, bicycles, a vacation, dinner at a local bistro, gift certificates, and a 60-inch (1.5 m) television. The production received mixed responses from businesses located in filming areas. Businesses were concerned about filming in October because that month is "a big month for merchants along Broughton [Street]". Some merchants suggested filming in February, July, or August instead.

Live-action filming resumed on October 21 on Tybee Island. The producers were permitted to film on the island after meetings held at the local City Hall; businesses and residents raised concerns about the possible effects of the filming and about sea turtle safety. Musician Slash, a member of the band Guns N' Roses, was seen on set at Tybee Pier, although he does not appear in the final film. The film crew later moved to Strand Avenue, where they filmed a chase scene with extras riding bicycles.

=== Deleted scenes ===
Animatic for a deleted scene in which Mrs. Puff (right) confronts SpongeBob and Plankton (left) following a high-speed chase

The Blu-ray release includes animatics of deleted scenes from the film, including a scene in which Mrs. Puff reappears in an apocalypse outfit (in the final film, she only appears in her normal attire). In the segment, Mrs. Puff wears a skull mask as she pursues SpongeBob and Plankton in a boatmobile chase. The "Squeeze Me" song plays on Plankton's radio until the boat crashes. Mrs. Puff catches up with the two runaways, takes off her mask, and tells SpongeBob he will pay the "ultimate penalty" for his reckless driving. She sifts through a variety of torture devices in a bag, then pulls out a red pen and gives SpongeBob a failing grade.

A fully animated musical sequence, "Thank Gosh It's Monday", was also cut from the film. A shortened version was used as an advertisement for the movie and uploaded to Paramount Pictures' YouTube channel. The extended cut is exclusive to the Blu-ray release, and the song used in the scene was released as the fifth track on the movie's soundtrack album.

=== Music ===
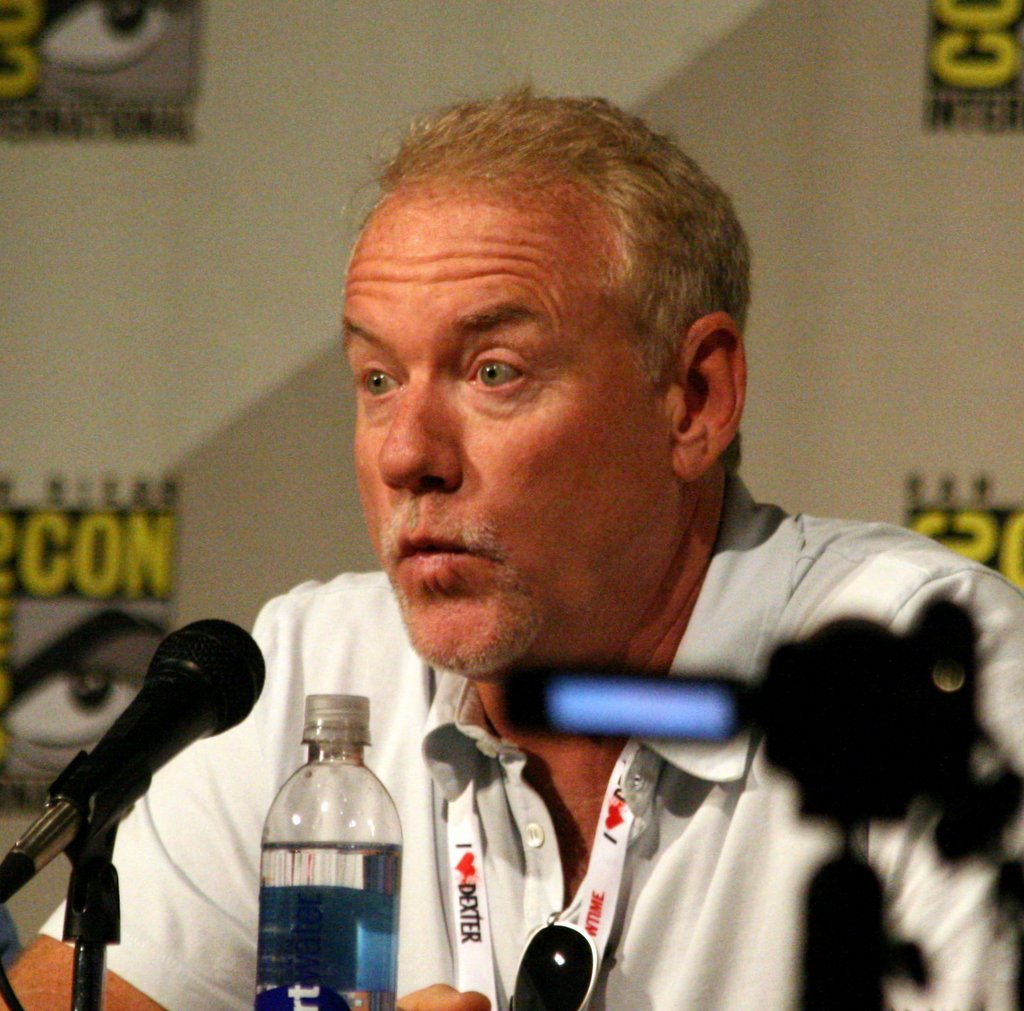
John Debney composed the film's score.

Music from The SpongeBob Movie: Sponge Out of Water is the soundtrack extended play that consisted of five songs, produced by Pharrell Williams and Chad Hugo. Hugo and Williams' band N.E.R.D wrote three songs for the film. The EP was released digitally on February 3, 2015.

The original score for the film was composed by John Debney. On February 16, 2015, Debney announced via Twitter that Varèse Sarabande would release his score digitally. The score released in the UK on March 2, 2015, and on the following day in the US, along with a physical release on March 24, 2015.

== Release ==
=== Marketing ===
In March 2012, in regards to consumer products for The SpongeBob Movie: Sponge Out of Water, Dauman stated, "This will be a Nickelodeon-branded movie. We'll license the toys, but we own it." On June 10, 2014, the film's first teaser poster was released, along with the announcement of its title. The poster is a nod to the 1950s Coppertone sunscreen advertisements, in which a dog is seen pulling a bikini bottom off a blonde girl.

At San Diego Comic-Con held on July 25, 2014, Paramount Pictures released the first footage from the film with Tom Kenny, SpongeBob's voice actor, hosting the panel. On July 31, 2014, the film's trailer was released. Throughout the year, trailers and 15-second teaser posters of the movie were shown.

=== Theatrical release ===
The SpongeBob Movie: Sponge Out of Water was originally planned for a 2014 release to celebrate the 10th anniversary of the first film. On August 1, 2013, however, in an article from The Hollywood Reporter, Paramount Pictures announced that the film would have its official wide release in theaters on February 13, 2015, in North America to avoid competition from the Teenage Mutant Ninja Turtles 2014 film, another Nickelodeon movie. On June 5, 2014, the film's release date was moved up to February 6, 2015, in order to avoid competition from 20th Century Fox's Kingsman: The Secret Service and Universal Pictures' Fifty Shades of Grey, which both premiered the following week. The film premiered on January 28, 2015, in Belgium and the Netherlands, and on January 30, 2015, in Iceland, Mexico, and Taiwan.

==== Irish-language release ====
On February 24, 2015, it was announced that Paramount Pictures, in partnership with Irish television broadcaster TG4, would release the film in the Irish language alongside the English release; it was the first Irish-language release from a major film studio. The film's Irish version, which is titled SpongeBob – An Scannán: Spúinse as Uisce, premiered on March 27, 2015, in Ireland.

=== Home media ===
The SpongeBob Movie: Sponge Out of Water was released on Digital HD on May 19, 2015, and was released on DVD and Blu-ray (2D and 3D) on June 2, 2015. The cover of the home-media releases – excluding the Blu-ray 3D release – and digital releases is the principal theatrical poster; the only difference being Plankton's appearance as his superhero alter-ego, Plank-Ton.

== Reception ==
=== Box office ===
The SpongeBob Movie: Sponge Out of Water grossed $162.9 million in North America and $162.1 million in other territories; a total worldwide gross of $325.1 million against a budget of $74 million. It has outgrossed the first SpongeBob movie, which made $140.2 million worldwide, and is the second-highest-grossing film based on an animated television show, behind The Simpsons Movie ($527.1 million). Deadline Hollywood calculated the net profit of the film to be $99.8 million.

==== North America ====
The SpongeBob Movie: Sponge Out of Water was originally expected to gross around $35 million in its opening weekend; however, it exceeded expectations on its opening day. On its opening weekend the film grossed $55.4 million, played in 3,641 theaters, with a $15,206 per-theater average, and finished in first place at the box office, exceeding American Sniper, which grossed $23.3 million, marking the first time in four weeks a film other than American Sniper was the top-grossing film. In its second weekend, The SpongeBob Movie: Sponge Out of Water earned $31.4 million, marking a 43.2% decline and dropping to number three, overtaken by Fifty Shades of Grey and Kingsman: The Secret Service. On its third weekend, the film stayed at number three, grossing $16.5 million. On its fourth weekend, the film was number three again, with $10.8 million.

==== Other territories ====
In five markets, The SpongeBob Movie: Sponge Out of Water was released for the three-day weekend of January 30, 2015 – a week ahead of North America release – and earned a gross of $8 million, $6.7 million of which came from a strong debut in Mexico. For its second weekend of February 6, 2015, the film earned a gross of $16.2 million, playing in theaters in 25 markets. The film opened at number one in Brazil and Spain, grossing $4.6 million and $1.9 million, respectively. It also remained at number one in Mexico, earning $2.4 million. In the UK, the film was released on March 27, 2015, in time for the Easter school holidays and opened at number three behind Cinderella and Home.

=== Critical response ===
On the review aggregator website Rotten Tomatoes, 80% of 102 critics' reviews are positive, with an average rating of 6.5/10. The website's consensus reads: "The SpongeBob Movie: Sponge Out of Water won't win over many viewers who aren't fans of the show, but for the converted, it's another colorful burst of manic fun." Metacritic, which uses a weighted average, assigned the film a score of 62 out of 100, based on 27 critics, indicating "generally favorable" reviews. Audiences polled by CinemaScore gave the film an average grade of "B" on an A+ to F scale, a grade down from the "B+" earned by the previous film.

Andrew Barker of Variety praised the film for "never even feigning a lick of seriousness"; he felt the film is too long and the CGI sequences are inferior to the traditionally animated ones. Barker said the film would prove "popular among the franchise's key grade-schooler and head-shop-owner demographics". Michael Rechtshaffen of The Hollywood Reporter said the film's two animation styles failed "to create a cohesive whole in spite of all the inspired non sequiturs ... the live action/CG stuff never satisfyingly jibes with the traditional nautical nonsense down below", and that although the film was inferior to the first one, it would likely be a box office success. Barbara VanDenburgh of The Arizona Republic gave the film three-and-a-half stars out of five, saying, "The plot is straightforward, predictable and slight, no more intricate a plot than a 15-minute TV episode would have. It's the freewheeling madness of its execution that makes the movie such a trip – as in acid trip."

Elizabeth Weitzman of the New York Daily News gave The SpongeBob Movie: Sponge Out of Water four stars out of five, saying; "The spirit of the series remains true: cheerfully random jokes, blink-and-you'll-miss-them references and, above all, a silly, stubbornly sentimental streak that only the crabbiest cynic could dismiss". Colin Covert of the Star Tribune gave the film three stars out of five, saying it "weaves a silly – and often funny – spell. It's a scrappy little B-movie that zips along rather entertainingly." Jen Chaney of The Washington Post gave the film two stars out of four, saying; "There's something about this project that, despite checking all of the requisite plot and sensibility boxes, doesn't convey as an organic work of SpongeBob-ishness".

Nicolas Rapold of The New York Times gave the film a positive review, saying; "While less fluid and fresh than its 2004 predecessor, the new film displays enough nutty writing and sheer brio to confirm the stamina of its enduring and skillfully voiced characters". Gwen Ihnat of The A.V. Club gave the film a B+, saying; "The visual effects and fast and furious quips combine for that rarest of releases: one that both parents and kids can enjoy (just like the show), leaving viewers of any age hoping that the next SpongeBob movie isn't an entire decade off". Alonso Duralde of The Wrap wrote, "The jokes are consistently hilarious, with enough variety to tickle the funny bones of old salts and young fishies alike".

Claudia Puig of USA Today gave the film two stars out of four, saying; "The live-action elements – mostly in the person of Antonio Banderas as cranky pirate Burger Beard, who spends most of his time addressing a flock of seagulls – don't mesh seamlessly with the animated sequences. It almost feels like two movies awkwardly melded together." John Semley of The Globe and Mail gave The SpongeBob Movie: Sponge Out of Water two-and-a-half stars out of four, saying it "mostly nails what has always made the character, and his brightly coloured underwater world, so endearing: the abundant innocence, the welcome lack of cynicism and the out-and-out stupidity". Christy Lemire of RogerEbert.com gave the film two-and-a-half stars out of four, saying it "remains true to the surrealism of its animated television roots. But it also tries to force a live-action element which isn't as comfortable a fit as a certain pair of symmetrical trousers."

=== Accolades ===
Accolades received by The SpongeBob Movie: Sponge Out of Water
| Award | Category | Recipient(s) | Result | Ref. |
|---|---|---|---|---|
| Nickelodeon Kids' Choice Awards | Favorite Animated Movie | The SpongeBob Movie: Sponge Out of Water | Nominated | |
| Nickelodeon Mexico Kids' Choice Awards | Favorite Movie | The SpongeBob Movie: Sponge Out of Water | Nominated | |
| British Academy Children's Awards | BAFTA Kids' Vote - Feature Film | The SpongeBob Movie: Sponge Out of Water | Nominated | |
| 43rd Annie Awards | Animated Effects in an Animated Production | Brice Mallier, Paul Buckley, Brent Droog, Alex Whyte, Jonothan Freisler | Nominated | |
| 43rd Annie Awards | Voice Acting in an Animated Feature | Tom Kenny | Nominated | |

== Other media ==
A video game featuring a plot set directly after that of The SpongeBob Movie: Sponge Out of Water, published by Activision, and titled SpongeBob HeroPants was released on February 3, 2015 in North America and on March 26, 2015 in Europe for the Nintendo 3DS, PlayStation Vita (cross-compatible with PlayStation TV), and Xbox 360. The game on all three platforms received mostly negative reviews, many point-out the uninspired gameplay, dull graphics, poor level design, glitches, lack of polish and that it barely follows the plot of the film.

A mobile game titled The SpongeBob Movie Game: Sponge on the Run was released on January 22, 2015, for iOS and Android. It is an endless running game based on the film and features several mini-games.

== Standalone sequel ==
In April 2015, Viacom announced a third SpongeBob SquarePants movie was in development. In April 2018, Tibbitt was replaced as director by Tim Hill and the third film's official subtitle, It's a Wonderful Sponge, was announced. Paramount assigned the third film with a scheduled release date of August 7, 2020. On January 22, 2019, it was confirmed that production on the film had officially begun. On November 12, 2019, the title of the movie had been changed from its original title, It's a Wonderful Sponge, to its new title, Sponge on the Run. The film had a theatrical release in Canada on August 14, 2020, with a release of the film on premium video-on-demand and Paramount+ for the United States on March 4, 2021.
