= On the Run (What We Do in the Shadows) =

- What We Do in the Shadows episode
- Episode no.: Season 2 Episode 6
- Directed by: Yana Gorskaya
- Written by: Stefani Robinson
- Cinematography by: DJ Stipsen
- Editing by: Dane McMaster; Varun Viswanath
- Production code: XWS02007
- Original air date: May 13, 2020
- Running time: 19 minutes

Guest appearances
- Mark Hamill as Jim the Vampire; Madeleine Martin as Lucy; Ashley Botting as Coach Swanson; Matt Berry as Jackie Daytona

Episode chronology
← Previous "Colin's Promotion"	Next → "The Return"

"On the Run" is the sixth episode of the second season of the American mockumentary comedy horror television series What We Do in the Shadows, set in the franchise of the same name. It is the sixteenth overall episode of the series and was written by executive producer Stefani Robinson, and directed by Yana Gorskaya. It was released on FX on May 13, 2020.

The series is set in Staten Island, New York City. Like the 2014 film, the series follows the lives of vampires in the city. These consist of three vampires, Nandor, Laszlo, and Nadja. They live alongside Colin Robinson, an energy vampire; and Guillermo, Nandor's familiar. The series explores the absurdity and misfortunes experienced by the vampires. In the episode, Laszlo flees after a vampire demands payment for an old debt, settling in Pennsylvania as a bartender.

According to Nielsen Media Research, the episode was seen by an estimated 0.436 million household viewers and gained a 0.19 ratings share among adults aged 18–49. The episode received extremely positive reviews from critics, who praised Laszlo's character development, humor and Hamill's guest appearance. The episode received a nomination for Outstanding Writing for a Comedy Series at the 72nd Primetime Emmy Awards.

== Plot ==
A vampire named Jim (Mark Hamill) confronts Laszlo (Matt Berry), claiming he is owed unpaid rent from Laszlo's sojourn to San Diego 167 years previously. Jim tells Laszlo he has been hunting him ever since, and demands either the money or a duel. Laszlo refuses to pay, and while Jim is distracted, transforms into a bat and flees from the house.

Laszlo arrives at a motel to retrieve an old disguise (which consists only of blue jeans and a toothpick) and write a letter to Nadja (Natasia Demetriou), proclaiming that he intends to disappear forever. He moves to Clairton, Pennsylvania, as it sounds similar to Transylvania. He now works as a "regular human" bartender named Jackie Daytona, having killed the previous bar owner. He earns the respect of the townspeople for his energetic party-going attitude, as well as supporting the local girls volleyball team, which has improved its performance since his arrival. When he discovers that the girls will not be able to participate in the state finals due to state budget cuts, Laszlo throws a talent show at the bar to raise funds.

Meanwhile, back in Staten Island, Nadja is devastated by Laszlo's absence. Colin Robinson (Mark Proksch) consoles her and tries to kiss her, which she rejects. He tries to do the same with the Nadja doll, but she declines as well.

At his bar, Laszlo is visited by Jim, who fails to recognize him. Jim, who has been searching the town for Laszlo, asks "Jackie" for help in finding him. He also attends the talent show, where they raise enough money for the team. However, Jim discovers Laszlo's identity when he notices he casts no reflection in a mirror, and the two fight in the bar, culminating in a fire that burns the raised funds. Putting aside their differences, Laszlo gives a Big Mouth Billy Bass to pay his debt, satisfying Jim. He leaves his life in Pennsylvania, setting his bar ablaze to collect the insurance money and using it to pay the girls volleyball team. He returns home, to Nadja's delight, although Nandor (Kayvan Novak) is more ambivalent. Jim is revealed to have become the new volleyball team's coach, but is devastated when he accidentally breaks the singing fish. Discovering that it is in fact cheap and easily replaceable, he angrily curses Laszlo.

== Production ==
=== Development ===
In April 2020, FX confirmed that the sixth episode of the season would be titled "On the Run", and that it would be written by executive producer Stefani Robinson, and directed by Yana Gorskaya. This was Robinson's third writing credit, and Gorskaya's first directing credit.

=== Casting ===
In January 2020, it was announced that Mark Hamill would guest star in the series. Hamill was a fan of the film and the series, and his praise on social media attracted the attention of the producers, who offered him a role in the series.

== Reception ==
=== Viewers ===
In its original American broadcast, "On the Run" was seen by an estimated 0.436 million household viewers with a 0.19 in the 18-49 demographics. This means that 0.19 percent of all households with televisions watched the episode. This was a 15% decrease in viewership from the previous episode, which was watched by 0.378 million household viewers with a 0.15 in the 18-49 demographics.

With DVR factored in, the episode was watched by 1.04 million viewers with a 0.4 in the 18-49 demographics.

=== Critical reviews ===
"On the Run" received extremely positive reviews from critics. Katie Rife of The A.V. Club gave the episode an "A–" grade and wrote, "Maybe it's a 'me' thing but if his role on the show hadn't been announced in advance, I would not have immediately recognized Mark Hamill on this week's What We Do In The Shadows. Hamill co-stars as Jim the Vampire in what's essentially a two-hander of an episode, taking Laszlo out on his first real, episode-length solo adventure as he flees an immortal debt he owes for a stay in Jim's guest room back in 1853. And Hamill is absolutely hilarious in the role, putting the voice acting skills he utilized in the second most iconic role of his career to use along with a wig, mustache, and some contacts... okay, fine, it probably is just me being halfway face blind."

Tony Sokol of Den of Geek gave the episode a 4 star rating out of 5 and wrote, "What We Do in the Shadows continues to mine the vampire mythology for new ways to parody it. The Billy Bass decoration is as good a stand-in for the vampires as the toothpick is a disguise. This is a fish-out-of-water comedy for the ages. Sure, some things don't make sense. If the vampire landlord suffered over a century of financial woes because Laszlo stiffed him out of what amounts to two months' rent, he probably wasn't a very good landlord, or vampire, to begin with. 'On the Run' is a fun entry, which doesn't break particularly new ground, but doesn't get caught in the sinkhole." Greg Wheeler of The Review Geek gave the episode a 4 star rating out of 5 and wrote, "Much like the first season, Shadows is establishes itself as one of the best comedies on TV right now and as we cross the halfway point of the show, it'll be interesting to see what happens within the remaining episodes."

=== Accolades ===
For the episode, Stefani Robinson was nominated for Outstanding Writing for a Comedy Series at the 72nd Primetime Emmy Awards. She lost the award to Schitt's Creek for the episode "Happy Ending".
