= Colin's Promotion =

- What We Do in the Shadows episode
- Episode no.: Season 2 Episode 5
- Directed by: Jemaine Clement
- Written by: Shana Gohd
- Cinematography by: DJ Stipsen
- Editing by: Yana Gorskaya; Dane McMaster
- Production code: XWS02005
- Original air date: May 6, 2020
- Running time: 21 minutes

Episode chronology
← Previous "The Curse"	Next → "On the Run"

"Colin's Promotion" is the fifth episode of the second season of the American mockumentary comedy horror television series What We Do in the Shadows, set in the franchise of the same name. It is the fifteenth overall episode of the series and was written by Shana Gohd, and directed by executive producer Jemaine Clement. It was released on FX on May 6, 2020.

The series is set in Staten Island, New York City. Like the 2014 film, the series follows the lives of vampires in the city. These consist of three vampires, Nandor, Laszlo, and Nadja. They live alongside Colin Robinson, an energy vampire; and Guillermo, Nandor's familiar. The series explores the absurdity and misfortunes experienced by the vampires. In the episode, Colin Robinson gets promoted and uses his position to drain energy from the employees.

According to Nielsen Media Research, the episode was seen by an estimated 0.378 million household viewers and gained a 0.15 ratings share among adults aged 18–49. The episode received mostly positive reviews from critics, who praised the focus on Colin Robinson's character and humor, although the subplot with the vampires received a mixed response.

== Plot ==
Colin Robinson (Mark Proksch) is called by his superiors, fearing that they might fire him as he still does not know what his company does. Instead, he is actually promoted. He shares the news with the vampires, but they are not interested. He later shares with the documentary crew that he often feels ignored as they feel he wants to drain their energy, even when he is sincere.

During a conference, the presentation malfunctions, and the employees laugh at one of Colin Robinson's jokes. Discovering that they now have to listen to him in his new position, Colin Robinson starts to use this to drain their energy, becoming even more powerful and ignoring the vampires at home. The vampires discover some of their old paintings at the house. Nadja (Natasia Demetriou) finds a painting, realizing that it is a portrait of her old village, which had been ravaged and destroyed. She then discovers that Nandor (Kayvan Novak) was one of the ravagers, causing her to try to kill him.

Colin Robinson becomes even more powerful, to the point where he can easily drain people and plants, and even fly. The vampires also fall victim to his drain, even getting to physically age while Colin Robinson's head grows bigger. Feeling he does not need the vampires, Colin Robinson creates two copies of himself. However, the Colins engage in argument, eventually draining each other to death. The vampires, now back to their normal state, bury the three copies on their yard. As they deliver a eulogy, Colin Robinson rises from the bunch, having just wanted to hear their words, although the other copies died. With the company now financially ruined, Colin Robinson moves to another company, although he has not been officially hired. Back at the house, Laszlo (Matt Berry) makes a new version of the painting, which now includes him as a warrior about to have sex with Nadja, while Nandor burns in a cabin.

== Production ==
=== Development ===
In April 2020, FX confirmed that the fifth episode of the season would be titled "Colin's Promotion", and that it would be written by Shana Gohd, and directed by series creator Jemaine Clement. This was Gohd's first writing credit, and Clement's fourth directing credit.

== Reception ==
=== Viewers ===
In its original American broadcast, "Colin's Promotion" was seen by an estimated 0.378 million household viewers with a 0.15 in the 18-49 demographics. This means that 0.15 percent of all households with televisions watched the episode. This was a 39% decrease in viewership from the previous episode, which was watched by 0.618 million household viewers with a 0.23 in the 18-49 demographics.

With DVR factored in, the episode was watched by 0.923 million viewers with a 0.4 in the 18-49 demographics.

=== Critical reviews ===
"Colin's Promotion" received extremely positive reviews from critics. Katie Rife of The A.V. Club gave the episode a "B" grade and wrote, "Colin's rise to boring power makes up the majority of this week's episode, with a running bit about the vampires rearranging their art collection seeming more like a sidebar than a fully formed subplot. Both of these elements had some laugh-out-loud funny lines; I quite enjoyed both Nandor's awkward eulogy and Nadja's warbling throat-singing at the graveside of the three Colins, for example, and Mark Proksch's sneaky spying on his subordinates was often hilarious. That being said, neither was the liveliest premise in What We Do In The Shadows history. Perhaps that's just the nature of the beast, when the beast is named Colin Robinson."

Tony Sokol of Den of Geek gave the episode a perfect 5 star rating out of 5 and wrote, "Vampires and sharks are very similar. They are both indiscriminate in their slaughter and feared for their eating frenzies. Just when it looks like Colin will jump the shark, What We Do in the Shadows steps back from the abyss to end on a balanced note. The horrific bits add to the comic bites deliciously. 'Colin's Promotion' continues the comic excellency the series found in its second season. The timing is perfect, the performances assured, and the interaction is solid. The vampire mythology is suitably skewered in mostly unexpected ways." Greg Wheeler of The Review Geek gave the episode a 4 star rating out of 5 and wrote, "As we reach the halfway point of this season, Shadows continues to impress and solidifies itself as one of the best comedies on TV right now."
