= Rodger Bumpass =

American actor (born 1951)

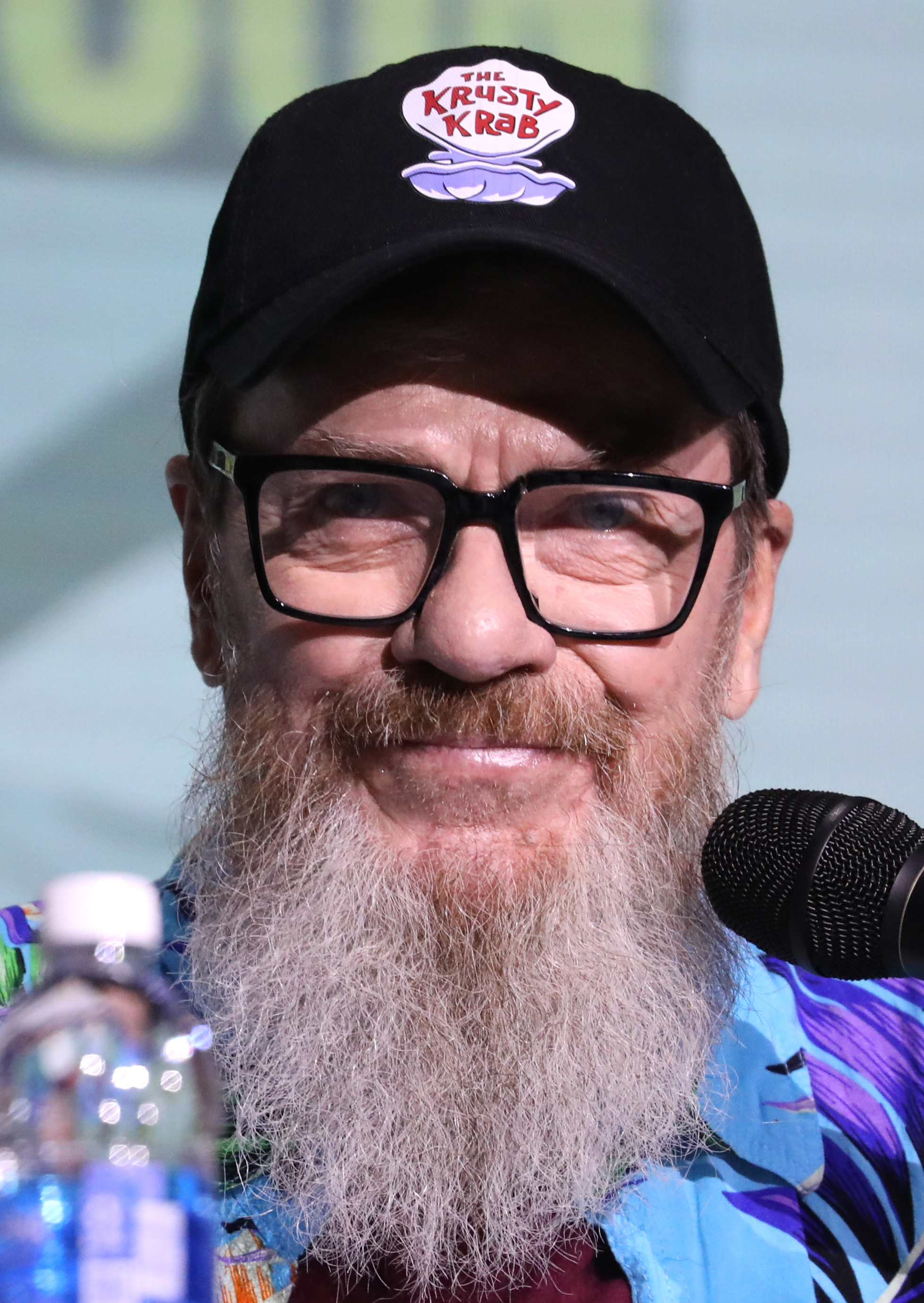
- Bumpass at the 2024 San Diego Comic-Con
- Born: November 20, 1951 (age 75); Little Rock, Arkansas, U.S.
- Other name: Roger Bumpass
- Education: Arkansas State University (BA)
- Occupation: Actor
- Years active: 1977–present
- Spouse: Angela VanZandt (m. 2019)

Rodger Bumpass (born November 20, 1951) is an American actor. He is a main cast member on the animated television series SpongeBob SquarePants, providing the voice of Squidward Tentacles, among other characters.

Bumpass also voiced The Chief in the animated series Where on Earth Is Carmen Sandiego?, Professor Membrane in Invader Zim and Mr. Besser, the school principal in the animated series The Kids from Room 402. Bumpass has amassed credits on other animated films, animated television series, and video games, and reprises the role of Squidward Tentacles in all SpongeBob SquarePants associated media.

== Early life ==
Rodger Bumpass was born on November 20, 1951, in Little Rock, Arkansas, to Carroll C. (1924–2009) and Virginia Cathey Bumpass (1921–2004). He had two siblings, one of whom was stillborn. His parents ran a dry cleaning business. He described his mother as "the life of the family" and his father "a typical Southern male with Southern male disgust" but added that he was loving and giving. As a child, Bumpass idolized Mel Blanc and would do impressions of Looney Tunes characters as well as other cartoon characters. He memorized the comedy albums of Jonathan Winters and Bill Cosby and was inspired by Tim Conway's physical comedy.

Bumpass attended Little Rock Central High School, where he received his first training in theatre. He then majored in radio–TV and minored in theatre at Arkansas State University. He worked at the campus radio station and also at Jonesboro's ABC affiliated television station, KAIT-TV, where he had multiple duties as announcer, film processor, cameraman, audio technician, and technical director. While at KAIT, Bumpass also wrote, produced, and performed in a late-night comedy program called Mid-Century Nonsense Festival Featuring Kumquat Theater. He graduated from A-State in 1976, and when encouraged by an A-State professor to consider professional theatre, he moved to New York in June 1977.

== Career ==
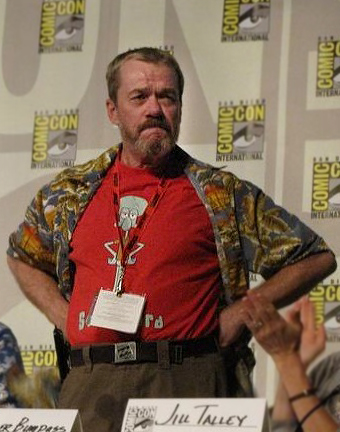
Bumpass in 2009

In the late 1970s, Bumpass was involved with a number of National Lampoon productions. In 1977, he won a role in the National Lampoon music and comedy road show That's Not Funny, That's Sick and toured with them until 1978. That same year, he appeared in the National Lampoon TV special Disco Beaver from Outer Space for HBO. In 1979, Bumpass was cast as the leading role in a National Lampoon film to be called Jaws 3, People 0, in which he would have a love scene with Bo Derek. However, the film was cancelled due to objections by the creators of the movie Jaws. In 1980, Bumpass created the character of 'Fartman' to appear on the National Lampoon LP The White Album, which later inspired the Howard Stern character of the same name. He also made appearances in movies such as Escape from New York and Bio-Dome; however, when the demand for voice actors became higher, he started doing background voices on shows such as Batman: The Animated Series, Bonkers and Teenage Mutant Ninja Turtles until he got a more prominent role on Where on Earth Is Carmen Sandiego?.

He has since lent his voice in multiple Pixar films such as A Bug's Life, Toy Story 2, Monsters, Inc., The Incredibles, and Monsters University. He has done additional voices for shows such as Gravity Falls, Rugrats, Alvin and the Chipmunks and Mighty Mouse: The New Adventures, also voicing Foreman in the English dub of Spirited Away. He is also known for voicing The Chief from Where on Earth Is Carmen Sandiego?, Doctor Light on Teen Titans and Teen Titans Go along with Professor Membrane on Invader Zim.

=== SpongeBob SquarePants ===
Bumpass is best known to present-day viewers as the voice of Squidward Tentacles and various incidental characters on the Nickelodeon animated comedy series SpongeBob SquarePants. When he auditioned for the role in 1999, the character notes he received highlighted Squidward's prominent nose, which inspired him to give the character the iconic "nasally" sounding voice. He has also provided the voice of other characters such as Squidward's mother. Bumpass has also voiced Squidward in the SpongeBob film series, spinoff shows and video games.

Many of the show's crew praise Bumpass for his performance and similitude to the character. Tom Kenny called Bumpass "brilliant" and has stated that "when he goes apoplectic as Squidward while recording, his head turns red, and you're afraid he's going to have an embolism."

In 2012, Bumpass received a Daytime Emmy Award nomination for his role as Squidward.

The show had its 20th anniversary in 2019. In celebration, a television special was aired, titled "SpongeBob's Big Birthday Blowout". One scene includes each of the show's main characters' voice actors portraying live-action versions of their characters. While not the first SpongeBob SquarePants episode that blended animated sequences with live-action characters, this was the first time that the characters' voice actors have all been in a live-action scene together.

== Personal life ==
On July 27, 2019, Bumpass married Angela VanZandt, with whom he attended high school 50 years prior.

Bumpass is a collector of SpongeBob memorabilia and he claims to have one of the biggest collections in the world.

In February 2022, Bumpass received a special tribute at the Arkansas State Capitol. The Arkansas Senate passed Resolution 25, recognizing his accomplishments for his iconic voice work as Squidward. The moment was made even more memorable when he responded in character, delivering the University of Arkansas "Woo Pig Sooie!" cheer. In September of that same year, Bumpass was inducted into the Arkansas Walk of Fame in Hot Springs.

=== Legal issues ===
On January 15, 2016, Bumpass was arrested for alleged DUI in Burbank, California. A police report of the incident alleged that officers of the Burbank Police Department found Bumpass in his car in the middle of the road. Bumpass admitted to drinking and driving, and he failed a sobriety test. His blood alcohol levels were said to be more than twice the legal limit. He was later released on a $15,000 bail shortly the next morning. (Note: Attributed to multiple sources:)

The incident was first reported by celebrity gossip website TMZ on January 19. A day later, Bumpass admitted the arrest to TMZ but also said police lied about elements of the incident. Nickelodeon representatives were notified of the incident by Bumpass, but did not release any immediate comments or actions regarding the matter.

On January 25, 2016, ten days after the incident, Nickelodeon representatives confirmed to TMZ Bumpass would remain on SpongeBob SquarePants, as a DUI did not violate the morality clause of his contract.

== Filmography ==
=== Live-action roles ===
==== Film ====
Year	Title	Role	Notes
1981	Escape from New York	Dancer	Credited as Roger Bumpass
1986	National Lampoon's Class of '86		
1987	The Running Man	Phil Hilton	Credited as Roger Bumpass
1996	Bio-Dome	Narrator	
1999	Baby Huey's Great Easter Adventure	Baby Huey (in-suit performer), Irv	Direct-to-video

==== Television ====
Year	Title	Role	Notes
1978	Disco Beaver from Outer Space		Television film
1981	Two Reelers	Roger	Television film
1983	Wizards and Warriors	Prisoner	Episode: "The Dungeon of Death"
1984	Footlight Frenzy	Benny the Stage Manager, Johnny Chicago	Television film
1984	Hot Flashes	Chuck Fodder	5 episodes
1988	What Price Victory		Television film
1992	Silk Stalkings	Jack Fellman	Episode: "Shock Jock"
1994	Shadow of Obsession	Custodian	Television film
1995	Hart to Hart: Secrets of the Hart	Higgins	Television film
2002	Santa Jr.	Wally Fisk	Television film
2003	Christmas Vacation 2: Cousin Eddie's Island Adventure	Lab Visitor, Plumber, Air Controller	Television film
2004	Just Desserts	Boz Roswell	Television film
2004	Murder Without Conviction	Patrick Talley Jr.	Television film
2004	A Boyfriend for Christmas	Russell Parker	Television film
2007	Marco Polo	Rustigielo	Television film

==== Theatre ====
Year	Title	Role	Notes
1977–1978	That's Not Funny, That's Sick	Himself	

=== Voice-over roles ===
==== Film ====
Year	Title	Role	Notes
1981	Heavy Metal	Hanover Fiste, Dr. Anrak	Credited as Roger Bumpass
1984	Robo Force: The Revenge of Nazgar	Mark Fury	
1992	Porco Rosso	Blond Pirate	English dub
1994	The Super Dave Superbowl of Knowledge	Additional voices	Television film
1995	Theodore Rex	Additional voices	
1996	The Hunchback of Notre Dame	Frollo's Soldiers	
1997	Hercules	Man pointing at Young Hercules	
1997	Beauty and the Beast: The Enchanted Christmas	Additional voices	Direct-to-video
1998	Quest for Camelot	Additional voices	
1998	A Bug's Life	Harry Mosquito	
1998	Pocahontas II: Journey to a New World	Additional voices	Direct-to-video
1999	Toy Story 2	Clerk	
1999	The Iron Giant	Maine Man, Rick the Soldier	
1999	Tarzan	Elephant #2, David	Credited as Roger Bumpass
1999	Scooby-Doo! and the Witch's Ghost	Perkins	Direct-to-video
1999	The Amazing Adventures of Spider-Man	Dr. Octopus	
2000	Titan A.E	Additional voices	
2000	The Emperor's New Groove	Male Villager #1, Male Villager #8	
2001	Atlantis: The Lost Empire	Mr. Hickenbottom, Chief of the Watch	ADR Group
2001	Spirited Away	Foreman	2002 English dub
2001	Monsters, Inc.	CDA, News Anchor	
2001	Osmosis Jones	Announcer for Nerve News Network	
2002	Cinderella II: Dreams Come True	King's Guards	Direct-to-video
2002	The Hunchback of Notre Dame II	Frollo's Soldiers	Direct-to-video; Uncredited
2002	Spirit: Stallion of the Cimarron	Colonel's Soldiers	
2002	Treasure Planet	Turnbuckle, Police Robot #1	
2002	Lilo & Stitch	Man	
2003	Brother Bear	Male Bear #2	
2004	The SpongeBob SquarePants Movie	Squidward Tentacles	
2004	The Incredibles	Mr. Incredible's Lawyer	
2006	Curious George	Hunter #1	
2006	Ice Age: The Meltdown	Various Mammals	
2009	The Haunted World of El Superbeasto	Screaming Patron	Direct-to-video (credited as Roger Bumpass)
2010	Kung-Fu Magoo	General Smith, Driver	
2013	Monsters University	Jerry Jablonski	
2015	The SpongeBob Movie: Sponge Out of Water	Squidward Tentacles	
2019	Invader Zim: Enter the Florpus	Professor Membrane	Netflix film
2020	The SpongeBob Movie: Sponge on the Run	Squidward Tentacles	
2021	Seal Team	Sharks	
2024	Saving Bikini Bottom: The Sandy Cheeks Movie	Squidward Tentacles, Butch, Police Loudspeaker, Bikini Bottomite	Netflix film
2025	Plankton: The Movie	Squidward Tentacles, Fish Troop, Goofy Goober Employee	Netflix film
2025	Order Up	Squidward Tentacles	
2025	The SpongeBob Movie: Search for SquarePants	Squidward Tentacles	

==== Television ====
Year	Title	Role	Notes
1984	Alvin and the Chipmunks	Additional voices	13 episodes
1985	The Jetsons	Additional voices	Episode: "Elroy in Wonderland"
1987	Mighty Mouse: The New Adventures	Additional voices	17 episodes
1989	Ring Raiders	Scorch	5 episodes
1989–1991	The Real Ghostbusters	Louis Tully	12 episodes
1991	TaleSpin	Dr. Axolotl	Episode: "Bullethead Baloo"
1991	Tiny Toon Adventures	Ronald Grump	Episode: "Pollution Solution"
1991	Toxic Crusaders	Toxie, Dr. Killemoff	13 episodes Credited as Roger Bumpass
1992	Petal to the Metal	Grumbles	Short
1992	Raw Toonage	Grumbles the Grizzly	13 episodes
1993	Batman: The Animated Series	Hoffman	Episode: "Paging the Crime Doctor"
1993	Problem Child	Additional voices	Television series short
1993–1994	Bonkers	Grumbles Grizzly	10 episodes
1994	Teenage Mutant Ninja Turtles	Titanus	3 episodes
1994–1999	Where on Earth Is Carmen Sandiego?	Chief	40 episodes
1995	Timon & Pumbaa	Savage Lion	Episode: "You Ghana Join the Club"
1996	Quack Pack	Countdown Voice	Episode: "None Like It Hot"
1997	101 Dalmatians: The Series	Additional voices	Unknown episodes
1998	The Angry Beavers	Elephant, Sentry	Episode: "Zooing Time"
1998	CatDog	Pig, Man	Episode: "CatDogPig"
1998	Oh Yeah! Cartoons	Ravenrant, Radio DJ, Announcer, Cyclops	2 episodes
1998	Monster Farm	Rex, Frankenswine	
1999	Rugrats	Uncle Freddy	Episode: "Brothers Are Monsters"
1999–present	SpongeBob SquarePants	Squidward Tentacles, various characters	
1999–2000	The Kids from Room 402	Principal Besser	13 episodes
2000	Batman Beyond	Cop	Episode: "Betrayal"
2001	Time Squad	Socrates	Episode: "Feud for Thought"
2001–2003	Invader Zim	Professor Membrane, others	18 episodes
2002	The Zeta Project	Submarine Captain	Episode: "The Hologram Man"
2002	3-South	Additional voices	Episode: "College Material"
2003–2005	Teen Titans	Doctor Light	3 episodes
2003–2008	ChalkZone	Biclops / Man	10 episodes
2005	What's New, Scooby-Doo?	Steve	Episode: "Gentlemen, Start Your Monsters"
2008	Random! Cartoons	Lemurman	Episode: "Mind the Kitty"
2010	Chuggington	Additional voices	
2012	Gravity Falls	Various characters	
2013–present	Teen Titans Go!	Doctor Light	Recurring role
2014–2020	Doc McStuffins	Army Al	10 episodes
2015–2016	Mixels	Flamzer, Naut, Major Nixel, Gate Keepe, Narrator, others	2 episodes
2021–2024	Kamp Koral: SpongeBob's Under Years	Squidward Tentacles, Regigilled, various characters	
2021–present	The Patrick Star Show	Squidward Tentacles, Capt. Doug Quasar, Daddy Dartfish, various characters	

==== Video games ====
Year	Title	Role	Notes
1995	Carmen Sandiego: Junior Detective	Chief	
2000	Sacrifice	Gammel	
2001	SpongeBob SquarePants: Operation Krabby Patty	Squidward Tentacles	Credited as Roger Bumpass
2001	SpongeBob SquarePants: SuperSponge	Squidward Tentacles	Credited as Roger Bumpass
2002	Blood Omen 2	Magnus	
2002	Command & Conquer: Renegade	Gen. Gideon Raveshaw	
2002	SpongeBob SquarePants: Employee of the Month	Squidward Tentacles	
2002	SpongeBob SquarePants: Revenge of the Flying Dutchman	Squidward Tentacles	
2002	Treasure Planet: Battle at Procyon	Zirrelian Crew, Zirrelian Mayor, Arcturian Commander	
2003	Nickelodeon Toon Twister 3-D	Squidward Tentacles	
2003	SpongeBob SquarePants: Battle for Bikini Bottom	Squidward Tentacles	Credited as Roger Bumpass
2003	Ratchet & Clank: Going Commando	Angela Cross (disguised voice), Inventor	
2004	X-Men Legends	Sentinel, Scientist	
2004	SpongeBob SquarePants: Typing	Squidward Tentacles	
2005	Teen Titans	Doctor Light	
2005	SpongeBob SquarePants: Lights, Camera, Pants!	Squidward Tentacles	Credited as Roger Bumpass
2005	The SpongeBob SquarePants Movie: The Video Game	Squidward Tentacles	Credited as Roger Bumpass
2006	Nicktoons: Battle for Volcano Island	Squidward Tentacles	Credited as Roger Bumpass
2007	SpongeBob's Atlantis SquarePantis	Squidward Tentacles	Credited as Roger Bumpass
2007	Neverwinter Nights 2: Mask of the Betrayer	Additional voices	
2007	Buzz!: The Mega Quiz	Greg	
2008	SpongeBob SquarePants Featuring Nicktoons: Globs of Doom	Squidward Tentacles, Professor Membrane	Credited as Roger Bumpass
2008	Buzz!: Quiz TV	Greg	
2009	SpongeBob's Truth or Square	Squidward Tentacles	Credited as Roger Bumpass
2010	SpongeBob's Boating Bash	Squidward Tentacles	
2010	Dead to Rights: Retribution	Redwater, Cops, Brawlers	
2013	SpongeBob SquarePants: Plankton's Robotic Revenge	Squidward Tentacles, Captain	
2013	SpongeBob Moves In!	Squidward Tentacles	
2015	SpongeBob HeroPants	Squidward Tentacles	
2018	Lego DC Super-Villains	Doctor Arthur Light	
2020	SpongeBob SquarePants: Battle for Bikini Bottom – Rehydrated	Squidward Tentacles	Archival recordings
2022	Nickelodeon Kart Racers 3: Slime Speedway	Squidward Tentacles	
2023	SpongeBob SquarePants: The Cosmic Shake	Squidward Tentacles, Anchovies, Kids	
2023	Nickelodeon All-Star Brawl 2	Squidward Tentacles	
2024	SpongeBob SquarePants: The Patrick Star Game	Squidward Tentacles	
2025	SpongeBob SquarePants: Titans of the Tide	Squidward Tentacles, Anchovies, Citizens	

==== Theme parks ====
Year	Title	Role	Notes
2003	Jimmy Neutron's Nicktoon Blast	Squidward Tentacles	
2005	SpongeBob 4D	Squidward Tentacles	

== Awards and nominations ==
- 2012 – Daytime Emmy Award for Outstanding Performer in an Animated Program – Nominated
- 2013 — Behind the Voice Actors Awards Best Vocal Ensemble in a Television Series - Children's/Educational for SquarePants Sqaurepants — Nominated
- 2016 — Behind the Voice Actors Awards for Feature Film Voice Acting Award-Best Vocal Ensemble in a Feature Film: for The SpongeBob Movie: Sponge Out of Water — Nominated
