= Patrick Star =

SpongeBob SquarePants character

- SpongeBob SquarePants character
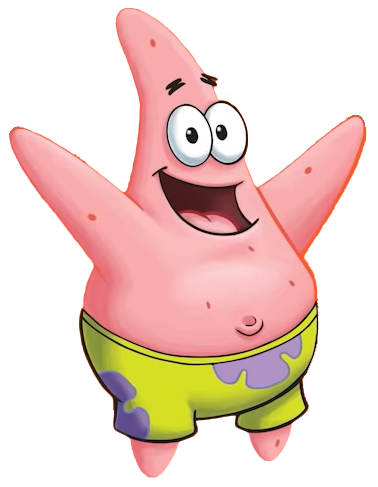
- First appearance: "Help Wanted"; SpongeBob SquarePants; May 1, 1999
- Created by: Stephen Hillenburg
- Designed by: Stephen Hillenburg
- Voiced by: Bill Fagerbakke; Jack Gore (young; Sponge on the Run)
- Portrayed by: Danny Skinner (Broadway)

In-universe information
- Species: Starfish
- Gender: Male
- Relatives: Cecil Star (father); Bunny Star (mother); Sam Star (older sister); Squidina Star (adoptive sister); GrandPat Star (grandfather)

Patrick Star is a fictional character in Nickelodeon's animated television series SpongeBob SquarePants. He is voiced by Bill Fagerbakke and was created and designed by Stephen Hillenburg. He first appeared in the series' pilot episode "Help Wanted" on May 1, 1999. In addition to his supporting role on SpongeBob SquarePants, Patrick also serves as the main protagonist of The Patrick Star Show, which premiered in 2021.

An overweight anthropomorphic coral pink starfish, Patrick lives under a rock in the underwater city of Bikini Bottom, and is the best friend of SpongeBob SquarePants. His most significant character traits are his laziness and stupidity, although he occasionally shows surprising intelligence. Patrick is unemployed and a self-proclaimed expert in the "art of doing nothing".

The character has received positive reactions from critics and fans alike. Patrick has been included in various SpongeBob SquarePants-related merchandise, including trading cards, video games, plush toys, and comic books. He is also a leading character in the four films and stage musical based on the franchise.

== Development ==
=== Creation and design ===
Stephen Hillenburg first became fascinated with the ocean and began developing his artistic abilities as a child. During college, he majored in marine biology and minored in art. He planned to return to college eventually to pursue a master's degree in art. After graduating in 1984, he joined the Ocean Institute, an organization dedicated to educating the public about marine science and maritime history. While he was there, he initially had the idea that would lead to the creation of SpongeBob SquarePants: a comic book titled The Intertidal Zone. In 1987, Hillenburg left the institute to pursue a career in animation.

A few years after studying experimental animation at the California Institute of the Arts, Hillenburg met Joe Murray, creator of the Nickelodeon series Rocko's Modern Life, at an animation festival, and was offered a job as a director of the show. Martin Olson, one of the writers for Rocko's Modern Life, read The Intertidal Zone and encouraged Hillenburg to create a television series with a similar concept. At that point, Hillenburg had not even considered creating his own series. However, he realized that if he ever did, this would be the best approach. Production on Rocko's Modern Life ended in 1996. Shortly afterwards, Hillenburg began working on SpongeBob SquarePants.

Early drawings of Patrick from Stephen Hillenburg's bible

For the show's characters, Hillenburg started to draw and used character designs from his comic book—including starfish, crab, and sponge. He described Patrick as "probably the dumbest guy in town". The character was conceived as a starfish to embody the animal's nature; according to Hillenburg, starfish look "dumb and slow", but they are "very active and aggressive" in reality, like Patrick. Hillenburg incorporated character comedy rather than topical humor on the show to emphasize "things that are more about humorous situations and about characters and their flaws." He designed Patrick and SpongeBob as such because "they're whipping themselves up into situations—that's always where the humor comes from. The rule is: Follow the innocence and avoid topical humor."

In spite of being depicted as having a good temperament or state of mind, Patrick has been shown in some episodes to have a tantrum. Patrick's emotional outbreak was originally written only for the first season episode "Valentine's Day", where SpongeBob and Sandy try to give Patrick a Valentine's Day gift, and "was supposed to be a one-time thing". However, according to episode writer Jay Lender, "when that show came back it felt so right that his dark side started popping up everywhere. You can plan ahead all you want, but the characters eventually tell you who they are."

Every main character in the show has its own unique footstep sound. The sound of Patrick's footsteps is recorded by the show's Foley crew, with a Foley talent wearing a slip-on shoe. Jeff Hutchins, show's sound designer said, "[Going] barefoot makes it tough to have much presence, so we decided that Patrick would be performed with shoes on."

=== Voice ===
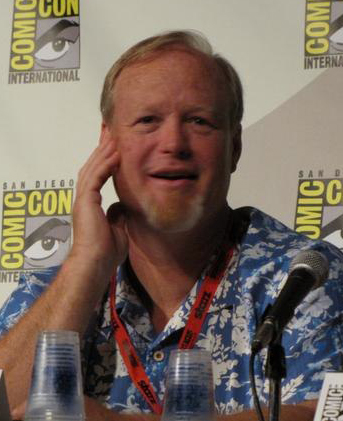
Bill Fagerbakke, the voice of Patrick

Patrick's voice is provided by Bill Fagerbakke, who also voices numerous other characters on SpongeBob SquarePants. While creating the show and writing its pilot episode in 1997, Hillenburg and Derek Drymon, the show's then-creative director, were also conducting auditions to find voices for the show's characters. Fagerbakke auditioned for the role of Patrick after Tom Kenny, SpongeBob's voice actor, had been cast. Fagerbakke said, "Steve is such a lovely guy, and I had absolutely no feeling for the material whatsoever." He described his experience in the audition, saying "I was just going in for another audition, and I had no idea what was in store there in terms of the remarkable visual wit and really the kind of endearing child-like humanity in the show. I couldn't pick that up from the audition material at all. I was just kind of perfunctorially trying to give the guy what he wanted."

Steve Hillenburg actually played for me a portion of Tom [Kenny]'s performance as the character, and they were looking for a counterpoint. And I do the big dumb stuff. That's my deal ... that's what I do [sic]. It was such a neat experience. Typically, when you audition for any kind of voiceover stuff, you're in a studio, but as I remember it, this was, like, in a weird conference room somewhere, and he had one of those little old cassette decks that's about half the size of a shoebox, and there was something so endearing about it.

— Fagerbakke, on his audition for the role.

Fagerbakke referred to Patrick as "AquaDauber" (a reference to his role as Michael "Dauber" Dybinski on the 1990s sitcom Coach) in the first few years of working on the show. Patrick is "enormously entertaining to portray" because, according to Fagerbakke, "when I'm performing Patrick, there are many secrets that I could never divulge". Fagerbakke's approach in voicing Patrick is "much the same way I would do [to] any kind of character." "I'm always looking for opportunities to explore that freewheeling imagination and insanity of children. To be able to plug in to that and let that carry you in to a performance is such a gas, I have so much fun with that. I love kids; I raised two girls and I love being a parent", he said. The cast members record as a whole cast. Fagerbakke says that the situation improves his performance as a voice actor because "there is something remarkable that happens when people are working together that is unique to that." Fagerbakke modeled his performance whenever Patrick is angry after that of American actress Shelley Winters.

Fagerbakke has been compared to Patrick's character, which he concurs with. Kenny said that "Bill [Fagerbakke] is a big guy. The world is almost too small for him. He's a force of nature, like Patrick." Writer Jay Lender said, describing Fagerbakke in the recording studio, "Bill Fagerbakke is the most thoughtful performer I've ever seen in the booth—he was always asking questions and really trying to get into the mindset, such as it is, of Patrick." Writer Kent Osborne said of Fagerbakke, "He is this big guy, and he plays Patrick so well. He's just this big guy, and he lumbers around." Fagerbakke said, "I'm clumsy. I'm goofy. I make mistakes all the time" and agreed that "I guess I'm a lot of Patrick."

== Appearances ==
=== Role in SpongeBob SquarePants ===
Patrick is the ignorant but humorous best friend of SpongeBob SquarePants. He is portrayed as being an overweight pink starfish, who serves as the village idiot of the underwater city of Bikini Bottom. Patrick gets dumber throughout the series and has been shown to make many ludicrous mistakes. Despite this, he has occasionally been portrayed as a savant, with articulate observance to certain subjects in specific detail. However, he always reverts quickly back to his usual, unintelligent self after displaying a moment of wisdom. He holds no form of occupation except for several very brief stints working at the Krusty Krab and at the Chum Bucket in a variety of positions, and mostly spends his time either clowning around with SpongeBob, catching jellyfish with him, or lounging beneath the rock under which he resides.

According to Kya Buller from Tyla, Patrick's house can be described as a visual pun on the phrase "living under a rock", since Patrick is a dim-witted character who is oblivious to common knowledge. Moreover, his residence also has a basis in marine biology, since some species of starfish do live under rocks in order to avoid predators and also to wait for their prey.

At home, Patrick is usually depicted either sleeping, watching TV, or engaged in the "art of doing nothing", at which he is an expert. All the furnishings in the space under his rock are made of sand, and Patrick can simply opt to quickly build up furniture as needed; even so, his living space is sparse and contains only the barest essentials. Aside from his best friend SpongeBob, who is often impressed by Patrick's capacity to come up with naïve yet genius plans or solutions, Patrick frequently irritates those around him and is confounded by the simplest of questions or subjects. The characters of Mr. Krabs and Squidward have no patience for Patrick's stupidity, and the former does not pay him much regard; Clancy Brown, who provides Mr. Krabs' voice, said, "The only person that he [Mr. Krabs] doesn't hire is Patrick because Patrick is just too stupid to work for nothing." Sandy often gets annoyed by Patrick, but still sees him as a friend.

=== In other media ===
Patrick has appeared in other SpongeBob SquarePants-related media, including board games, comic books, keychains, plush toys, trading cards and video games. Patrick has a major role in The SpongeBob SquarePants Movie, the first feature-length film adaptation of the show. The film was released on November 19, 2004 and has been a financial success, grossing over $140 million worldwide. He has also appeared in the film's sequel, which was released in theaters on February 6, 2015. In the second film, Patrick (along with SpongeBob, Sandy, Squidward, Mr. Krabs, and Plankton) is rendered in 3D (using CGI) in the live action scenes. The group becomes an "Avengers-type team", better known as "The Spongers"; Patrick transforms to Mr. Superawesomeness.

In 2009, John Fricker portrayed Patrick in the musical adaptation of the third season episode "The Sponge Who Could Fly". Fricker and the musical itself were well received by most critics. Gordon Barr and Roger Domeneghetti of the Evening Chronicle described the musical as "a silly riot of colour [...] as you'd have to expect from an adaptation of a cartoon TV show", while Viv Hardwick of The Northern Echo said that Fricker and Martin Johnston (Mr. Krabs) "win the biggest costume contest." A critic from the Chichester Observer wrote, "John Fricker is in his element as the simple but lovable Patrick Star".

The character of Patrick has become viral in the Internet in the forms of memes or image macros. A still from The SpongeBob SquarePants Movie, which displays Patrick in a drop-jawed look, inspired a YouTube user to create a presentation of Patrick's expression using a number of different filters. Following this, a YouTube user uploaded another video featuring Patrick reacting to Canadian singer Justin Bieber's 2010 single, "Baby". The meme called "Surprised Patrick" started to disseminate, with one of the first images was posted to Reddit by SeannyOC, and then reblogged onto I Can Has Cheezburger?'s Memebase. Comedy websites—including BiteTV, CollegeHumor, Mashable and Smosh—have published their own "Best of" lists and compilations, covering the "Surprised Patrick" meme's popularity. Mashable's Nena Prakash said, "For years, Patrick Star helped hold down Bikini Bottom while SpongeBob was flippin' burgers at [t]he Krusty Krab. But now it's time for Patrick to come out from under that rock and take a seat upon his royal meme throne, because he's an Internet star(fish)." Another popular meme based on the character is the "Push It Somewhere Else Patrick" image macro, which was taken from the second season episode "Sandy, SpongeBob, and the Worm", based on a scene where Patrick suggests that the town should relocate itself in order to deal with an Alaskan Bull Worm.

A CGI version of Patrick was part of Nickelodeon's 2022 Christmas Day National Football League game between the Denver Broncos and Los Angeles Rams, with Fagerbakke providing real-time commentary for the character. Patrick's most notable call came during a Russell Wilson interception. "That's not what he wanted to cook", Patrick said, mocking the "let Russ cook" slogan adopted by fans of the Denver quarterback.

=== The Patrick Star Show ===
On August 10, 2020, it was reported that a Patrick Star talk show titled The Patrick Star Show was in development with a 13-episode order. The show features Patrick hosting an imaginary talk show in his parents' house. it was officially announced by Nickelodeon on March 4, 2021 and premiered on the network later in the summer.

== Reception ==
=== Critical response ===
Critical reception for the character from both professionals and fans has been positive. In his DVD review for DVD Verdict, Bill Treadway called Patrick "the village idiot, who sometimes gives SpongeBob some really bad advice, but he is a loyal friend and that's something we don't see much of these days." He said, "Patrick is the definition of stupid and his antics will have you laughing out loud." In a review published in 2007, Peter Keepnews of The New York Times said, "Patrick is a popular character, and the new episodes illustrate why: He is unfailingly enthusiastic, touchingly loyal and absolutely undeterred by his intellectual limitations. Hilariously voiced by Bill Fagerbakke, he is not just an endearing comic creation but a role model for idiots everywhere."

Nancy Basile of About.com called Patrick "one of the silliest characters on SpongeBob SquarePants". In her DVD review of "SpongeBob and Friends: Patrick SquarePants", a Patrick-themed SpongeBob SquarePants home video release, Basile said, "The episodes included [...] are hilarious. They're not only some of Patrick's best episodes, but also some of the show's classic episodes." She ranked "That's No Lady" as Patrick's best episode and said, "I was remiss not to include this episode in my top ten [SpongeBob SquarePants episodes] list." She cited her favorite scene from the episode, where "Patrick can't read the number on Mr. Krabs' table, saying, 'Ford knee.' Mr. Krabs replies, 'That's a seven, Patricia.'" The Kids' Choice Awards, an annual awards show presented by Nickelodeon, added several new categories, including "Favorite Animated Animal Sidekick", in its 2014 ceremony. Patrick received the Kids' Choice Award Blimp for the category, winning to Perry the Platypus (Phineas and Ferb), Sparky (The Fairly OddParents) and Waddles (Gravity Falls).

=== Speculated homosexuality ===
In 2002, the show's popularity among the gay community grew, and it was reported that they had embraced the show, according to BBC Online. The Wall Street Journal also raised questions about SpongeBob and Patrick in an article that pointed out the show's popularity in the gay community. Tom Kenny, in response to the article, said "[I] felt the insinuation was a stretch." "I had heard that gay viewers enjoy the show in the same way that lots of people—college students, parents and children—like the show [...] I thought it was rather silly to hang an entire article on that. I don't think it's a case of it being a gay-friendly show—It's a human-being-friendly show. They're all welcome", Kenny said.

In 2005, a promotional video that involves SpongeBob promoting diversity and tolerance was criticized by two U.S. Christian evangelical groups, most notably Focus on the Family, because they saw the character was being used as an advocate for homosexuality though the video contained "no reference to sex, sexual lifestyle or sexual identity." The incident led to questions as to whether or not SpongeBob, his best friend Patrick, and the rest of the series' characters are homosexual characters. After this speculation and comments, Hillenburg repeated his assertion that sexual preference was never considered during the creation of the show. He clarified the issue and said "We never intended them to be gay. I consider them to be almost asexual. We're just trying to be funny and this has got nothing to do with the show." Tom Kenny and other production members were shocked and surprised that such an issue had arisen. Derek Drymon, the show's creative director until 2004, said, "If SpongeBob holds hands with Patrick it's because he's his best friend and he loves him. I think the whole thing is a part of a larger agenda to stigmatize gay people." Focus on the Family founder James Dobson later stated that his comments were taken out of context and that his original complaints were not with SpongeBob or any of the characters in the video but with the organization that sponsored the video, the We Are Family Foundation. Dobson noted that the foundation had posted pro-homosexual material on its website, but later removed it.

Queer theorist Jeffrey P. Dennis, author of the journal article "The Same Thing We Do Every Night: Signifying Same-Sex Desire in Television Cartoons", argued that SpongeBob and Sandy are not romantically in love, while adding that he believed that SpongeBob and Patrick "are paired with arguably erotic intensity". Dennis noted the two are "not consistently coded as romantic partners", since they live in separate residences, and have distinct groups of friends, but claimed that in the series, "the possibility of same-sex desire is never excluded." Martin Goodman of Animation World Magazine described Dennis's comments regarding SpongeBob and Patrick as "interesting".

== Legacy ==
In 2020, a new species of starfish from northwest Pacific seamounts was named Astrolirus patricki in honor of Patrick Star. All known specimens of A. patricki were found closely associated with hexactinellid sponges, and the species was thus named after the character Patrick Star as a reference to his friendship with SpongeBob.
