= Liza Johnson =

American film director and producer

- Johnson in 2024
- Born: 1970 or 1971 (age 55–56); Portsmouth, Ohio, U.S.
- Education: Williams College
- Occupations: Film director, producer, writer
- Years active: 1997–present

Liza Johnson is an American film director, producer, and writer.

== Biography ==
Johnson was born in Portsmouth, Ohio, in 1970 or 1971. She attended Williams College in Williamstown, Massachusetts, graduating with a B.A. in Visual Arts in 1992. She then went to the University of California, San Diego, where she received her MFA in 1995.

Her narrative films and experimental videos have screened in Berlin, Rotterdam Film Festival, at the Cannes Film Festival, and many other international festivals, the Museum of Modern Art in New York City, and other fine arts venues.

Her video installations have been shown in Artists Space in New York, the Institute of Contemportary Art (ICA) in Philadelphia, Cineboords in Rotterdam, Mass MoCA and WCMA in Massachusetts.

Johnson has also published academic and critical writing on art and film, and has curated a number of museum exhibitions and festival programs, including a Mix NYC Queer Experimental Film and Video Festival at Anthology Film Archives and Through Afghan Eyes: Culture in Conflict 1987-1992 at the Asia Society Museum in New York City.

Along with her collection of short films, Johnson has directed five feature films, including Return (2011) starring Linda Candellini, Hateship, Loveship (2013), Elvis & Nixon (2016), and Saving Bikini Bottom: The Sandy Cheeks Movie (2024).

In 2025, Netflix released Shondaland's The Residence, of which Johnson served as director for the first four episodes. That year, Johnson also directed The Diplomat on Netflix.

== Awards and honors ==
In 2010, deCordova Sculpture Park and Museum awarded Liza Johnson the $25,000 Rappaport Prize, awarded to a contemporary artist.

In 2011, Johnson's film, Return, starring Linda Cardellini, was selected for the Director's Fortnight at the Cannes Film Festival, the only American film to be honored at the Director's Fortnight that year.

In 2026, Johnson was nominated for the Directors Guild of America (DGA) Award for Outstanding Achievement in a Dramatic Series for her work directing the Netflix show The Diplomat.

== Filmography ==
Short film

- Giftwrap (1998)
- Falling (2004)
- Desert Motel (2005)
- South of Ten (2006) (Documentary short)
- In the Air (2009)
- Karrabing! Low Tide Turning (2012)

Feature film

- Fernweh – The Opposite of Homesick (2000)
- Return (2011)
- Hateship, Loveship (2013)
- Elvis & Nixon (2016)
- Saving Bikini Bottom: The Sandy Cheeks Movie (2024)

Television

| Year | Title | Notes |
|---|---|---|
| 2015 | Good Girls Revolt | Episode "Pilot" |
| 2017 | Feud | Episode "More, or Less" |
| 2017 | American Horror Story | Episode "Don't Be Afraid of the Dark" |
| 2018 | American Woman | Episode "The Heat Wave" |
| 2019 | A Series of Unfortunate Events | 2 episodes |
| 2019 | Barry | Episode "What?!" |
| 2019 | Sneaky Pete | Episode "The Mask Drop" |
| 2019 | Silicon Valley | 2 episodes |
| 2020 | What We Do in the Shadows | Episode "The Curse" |
| 2020 | Dead to Me | 2 episodes |
| 2021 | Physical | 3 episodes |
| 2021 | The Sex Lives of College Girls | Episode "The Truth" |
| 2023 | The Last of Us | Episode "Left Behind" |
| 2023-present | The Diplomat | 4 episodes |
| 2024 | The Franchise | 2 episodes |
| 2025 | The Residence | 4 episodes |
| 2026 | Paradise | 2 episodes |
