= The SpongeBob Movie: Sponge on the Run =

2020 animated/live action film by Tim Hill

- Paramount+ release poster
- Directed by: Tim Hill
- Screenplay by: Tim Hill
- Story by: Tim Hill; Jonathan Aibel Glenn Berger
- Based on: SpongeBob SquarePants by Stephen Hillenburg
- Produced by: Ryan Harris
- Starring: Tom Kenny; Awkwafina; Matt Berry; Clancy Brown; Rodger Bumpass; Snoop Dogg; Bill Fagerbakke; Tiffany Haddish; Carolyn Lawrence; Mr. Lawrence; Keanu Reeves; Danny Trejo; Reggie Watts
- Cinematography: Peter Lyons Collister
- Edited by: Michael W. Andrews
- Music by: Hans Zimmer; Steve Mazzaro
- Production companies: Paramount Animation; Nickelodeon Movies; United Plankton Pictures; MRC
- Distributed by: Paramount Pictures (Canada and China); Paramount+ (United States)
- Release dates: August 14, 2020 (Canada); November 5, 2020 (International); March 4, 2021 (United States)
- Running time: 91 minutes
- Country: United States
- Language: English
- Budget: $60 million
- Box office: $4.8 million

The SpongeBob Movie: Sponge on the Run is a 2020 American animated adventure comedy film written and directed by Tim Hill. Based on the television series SpongeBob SquarePants, it stars the series' regular voice cast and includes new characters (both live-action and animated) performed by Awkwafina, Snoop Dogg, Tiffany Haddish, Keanu Reeves, Danny Trejo, and Reggie Watts. The film follows SpongeBob on a journey to Atlantic City to rescue his kidnapped pet snail, Gary. The film is dedicated to the series creator, Stephen Hillenburg, who died in 2018, and also served as an executive producer on the project. It is the third theatrical film based on the series.

Development for a third SpongeBob SquarePants film began in April 2015, two months after the release of the second film. By January 2016, Jonathan Aibel and Glenn Berger had been hired to write the film, and by April 2018, Hill had been hired as director. It is the first film in the franchise to be fully animated in stylized computer-generated imagery (as opposed to being entirely animated in 2D like the first film, or the mixing of 2D and CGI animation in the second film). Hans Zimmer composed the film's score. Animation was provided by Mikros Image.

Originally slated for a worldwide theatrical release by Paramount Pictures, plans were changed due to the COVID-19 pandemic. The film was released theatrically in Canada on August 14, 2020, and digitally on Netflix in other territories on November 5, 2020. It was released as a premium video-on-demand offering and a Paramount+ launch title in the United States on March 4, 2021. Sponge on the Run received positive reviews from critics, and was nominated for Favorite Animated Movie at the 2022 Kids' Choice Awards. A fourth film, The SpongeBob Movie: Search for SquarePants, was released in 2025.

== Plot ==
In Bikini Bottom, Plankton works on a new plan to steal the Krabby Patty formula while Karen argues that SpongeBob is actually responsible for all his previous failures and not Mr. Krabs.

Meanwhile in Atlantic City, selfish ruler King Poseidon uses up all the slime from his latest sea snail, which is necessary to maintain his appearance. Poseidon decrees the obtaining of a new snail, and Plankton kidnaps SpongeBob's pet snail Gary so that SpongeBob will no longer interfere with his plans. The next morning, SpongeBob learns from Patrick that Gary was taken to Atlantic City. As part of his plan, Plankton offers Otto, a robot built by Sandy, to take them to the city, hoping they never return. Without SpongeBob cooking Krabby Patties, the Krusty Krab's enraged customers trash the restaurant despite Mr. Krabs and Squidward's efforts to stop them.

Otto drives SpongeBob and Patrick to an old Western town where they meet a tumbleweed spirit named Sage. He reveals to SpongeBob and Patrick that they are dreaming, and must overcome a special mission to continue their search, giving them a "Challenge Coin" to grant them bravery. They enter a tavern haunted by ghostly zombie pirates and decide to free their souls from the evil spirit "El Diablo". Diablo traps the duo, but is accidentally disintegrated when they expose him to sunlight, freeing the pirates' souls as SpongeBob and Patrick are woken up by Otto.

Now accompanied by Sage, SpongeBob discovers that Poseidon will enslave him with the rest of his previous snails when Gary's slime runs out. Arriving at Atlantic City, Sage warns the pair not to be distracted by the city's attractions, but they ignore his warnings. After a fun-filled night, SpongeBob and Patrick wake up in front of Poseidon's palace and enter it. Both are arrested and imprisoned in the dungeon when they try to take Gary.

Back in Bikini Bottom, Plankton arrives at the Krusty Krab, in which Mr. Krabs willingly gives him the formula, feeling depressed without SpongeBob, causing Plankton to feel unsatisfied. Later, upon hearing that SpongeBob and Patrick will be executed in a luxury show in Poseidon's Palace, Mr. Krabs, Squidward, Sandy, and a repentant Plankton decide to save them.

In prison, SpongeBob and Patrick discover that they have lost the "Challenge Coin" that allowed them to be brave, but Sage reveals to SpongeBob and Patrick that the "Challenge Coin" never had powers and that the bravery came from themselves. Before SpongeBob and Patrick can be executed, Mr. Krabs, Squidward, Plankton, and Sandy burst into the show to testify in favor of SpongeBob. Along with Patrick, each recounts their experience with SpongeBob at a summer camp, earning the audience's gratitude. Afterwards, the group performs a musical number to distract Poseidon and take Gary. Poseidon realizes the distraction and orders his guards to capture the group. SpongeBob and his friends manage to escape the guards and head towards the exit, but are once again cornered when Otto leaves them behind.

Poseidon offers to drop charges against the group if SpongeBob leaves Gary with him. SpongeBob refuses, arguing that his friends decided to rescue him even if they risked death. When Poseidon discovers he has no friends and reveals that he needs the slime for his appearance, SpongeBob offers to be his friend. Poseidon removes all his arrangements and returns to his true appearance; everyone accepts his look, and Poseidon allows SpongeBob to take Gary back home. He also releases all his enslaved snails to accompany them back to Bikini Bottom.

== Cast ==
=== Voices ===
The series' regular voice cast reprised their roles for the film.

- Tom Kenny as:
  - SpongeBob SquarePants
    - Antonio Raul Corbo as Young SpongeBob
  - Gary the Snail
  - French Narrator
- Bill Fagerbakke as Patrick Star
  - Jack Gore as Young Patrick
- Rodger Bumpass as Squidward Tentacles
  - Jason Maybaum as Young Squidward
- Clancy Brown as Mr. Krabs
- Mr. Lawrence as Plankton
- Jill Talley as Karen
- Carolyn Lawrence as Sandy Cheeks
  - Presley Williams as Young Sandy
- Mary Jo Catlett as Mrs. Puff
- Tim Hill as Documentary Narrator
- Matt Berry as King Poseidon
- Awkwafina as Otto
- Tiffany Haddish as Master of Ceremonies
- Reggie Watts as Chancellor

=== Live-action actors ===
- Keanu Reeves as Sage
- Snoop Dogg as The Gambler
- Danny Trejo as El Diablo

== Production ==
=== Development ===
In a February 2015 interview discussing The SpongeBob Movie: Sponge Out of Water's success at the box office, Megan Colligan, president of worldwide distribution and marketing at Paramount Pictures, stated the possibility of a third film was "a good bet." In another interview, Paramount vice-chairman Rob Moore remarked, "Hopefully, it won't take 10 years to make another film.", in reference to the time passed between The SpongeBob SquarePants Movie (2004) and its 2015 sequel. Later in 2015, it was revealed that Paramount was developing sequels to its franchises, including another SpongeBob film.

The film was initially scheduled for release in 2019, before being delayed to 2020. By January 2016, Jonathan Aibel and Glenn Berger, who previously wrote for Sponge Out of Water, had been hired to write the film.

In March 2017, Paramount president Marc Evans announced that the studio would work closely with Viacom on its TV brands, including the SpongeBob film. During the same month, Yahoo! Entertainment stated that the film would be titled The SpongeBob Movie.

In April 2018, the film's official title was revealed as The SpongeBob Movie: It's a Wonderful Sponge, and SpongeBob co-developer Tim Hill was announced as director and writer for the film. It was reported later in the year that the film would be written by Aibel, Berger, and Michael Kvamme. The principal cast – Tom Kenny, Bill Fagerbakke, Clancy Brown, Mr. Lawrence, Rodger Bumpass, Carolyn Lawrence, Jill Talley, Mary Jo Catlett, and Lori Alan – all reprise the roles as their respective characters from the series and the previous films including, Antonio Raul Corbo, Niketa Calame, Jack Gore, Presley Williams and Jason Maybaum as Young SpongeBob, Patrick, Sandy and Squidward respectively. In October 2018, at the VIEW Conference in Turin, Italy, Paramount Animation president Mireille Soria revealed the plot for the film. The same day, Hans Zimmer was announced as the composer for the film, while Paris and Montreal-based Mikros Image would handle animation for the film, which would be created entirely through computer animation.

On June 12, 2019, it was announced that Reggie Watts and Awkwafina were added to the cast while Cyndi Lauper and Rob Hyman, who wrote a song for The SpongeBob Musical, would be writing original songs for the film. It was also announced that Mia Michaels would be choreographing and Ali Dee Theodore would add an original song for the film. The next day, Snoop Dogg announced on Jimmy Kimmel Live! that he would be in the film.

On November 12, 2019, it was revealed that the film's title was changed from It's a Wonderful Sponge to Sponge on the Run, along with the casting of Keanu Reeves.

=== Filming ===
On January 22, 2019, it was confirmed that production on the film had officially begun. Like its predecessors, the film includes live-action sequences, and unlike the previous films, the animated sequences of the film are entirely computer-animated. Larry Fong was initially reported to serve as the film's cinematographer, but for unknown reasons, Peter Lyons Collister ended up solely with the credit.

== Soundtrack ==
Interscope Records released the film's soundtrack on March 5, 2021. Artists who are part of the original soundtrack include Becky G, Swae Lee, J Balvin, Tyga, Lil Mosey, Tainy, Weezer, Snoop Dogg, The Flaming Lips, and Kenny G. Cyndi Lauper and Rob Hyman also co-wrote the track "Secret to the Formula". Previous material that are part of the film but not on the soundtrack album are "Slow Ride" by Foghat, "Dream Weaver" by Gary Wright, Weezer's cover of the a-ha song "Take On Me", and Kenny G's cover of "My Heart Will Go On" from the film Titanic. The score for the film was composed by Hans Zimmer and Steve Mazzaro. It marks as Zimmer's second score for a Nickelodeon film, following Rango, and his second score for a film based on an animated series, after The Simpsons Movie.

== Release ==
=== Theatrical and streaming ===
The SpongeBob Movie: Sponge on the Run was originally scheduled to be theatrically released on February 9, 2019, by Paramount Pictures. It was then pushed back to August 2, 2019, before being delayed nearly a year to July 31, 2020. It was moved four more times: to July 17, 2020, May 22, 2020, July 31 (as a result of the COVID-19 pandemic), and finally August 7, 2020. In June 2020, it was announced that the film's theatrical release had been cancelled and it would instead be released through video on demand and CBS All Access (now Paramount+) in early 2021. In December 2020, it was revealed that the film would be releasing in February 2021. On January 28, 2021, it was announced that the film would release on March 4, 2021, the same day CBS All Access rebranded as Paramount+. In addition to the ViacomCBS streaming service, the film was available on Apple TV, Amazon Prime Video, Vudu, and other digital platforms.

In July 2020, Netflix acquired international distribution rights to the film, excluding the United States, Canada, and China. On July 30, 2020, Paramount Pictures Canada announced that the film would be released in Canadian theaters on August 14, 2020. Between the Netflix and Paramount+ deals, Paramount recouped the entire production cost of the film. The film was released internationally on Netflix on November 5, 2020.

=== Home media ===
The SpongeBob Movie: Sponge on the Run was released on DVD and Blu-ray on February 2, 2021, in Canada. In the U.S., the film was released on DVD and Blu-ray on July 13, 2021. Pearl Krabs (voiced by Lori Alan) appears in a deleted scene that is included on the film's Blu-Ray release.

== Reception ==
=== Box office ===
In the film's debut Canadian weekend, it grossed $865,824 from 300 theaters. Since Canada's grosses are factored into American totals, Sponge on the Run finished first at the box office, and had the highest weekend total for a film since the start of the pandemic. IndieWire estimated that had the film had a traditional North American theatrical release it would have opened to $25–30 million, including a $3 million total from Canada. In its second weekend, despite being added to an additional 26 theaters, the film dropped 36% to $550,000, finishing second behind Unhinged. In its third weekend the film made $400,000 from 314 theaters, then $345,000 in its fourth weekend, for a month-long running total of $3.6 million.

=== VOD rentals ===
In its first weekend of digital release in the U.S., the film was the most-rented title on FandangoNow, fourth on Google Play, and fifth on Apple TV.

=== Critical response ===
On review aggregator website Rotten Tomatoes, 66% of 74 critics have given the film a positive review, with an average rating of 6.1/10. The site's critics consensus reads, "Although its story may leave fans on the surface, The SpongeBob Movie: Sponge on the Run is a wondrously wacky visit to Bikini Bottom that retains the charm of the original series." On Metacritic, it has a weighted average score of 65 out of 100 based on reviews from 20 critics, indicating "generally favorable reviews".

Writing for IndieWire, David Ehrlich gave the film a grade of B− and said, "Even the weakest bits get by on good vibes and meta-cleverness ([Keanu] Reeves has become something of a human meme in recent years, but Sponge on the Run milks the actor's brand for a number of solid laughs), and the animation is detailed and inventive enough for the whole film to feel drenched in SpongeBob's demented energy." Writing for CTV News, Richard Crouse gave the film 3.5 stars and wrote: "Sponge on the Run brings with it the usual anarchy, inside jokes and unexpected celebrity cameos, but at its little osmotic heart is SpongeBob, a character who belongs to the same genus of entertainers as Soupy Sales, Stan Laurel and Pee-wee Herman." The Hollywood Reporter's David Rooney called the film "fast, fun, [and] demented" and wrote: "The technological overhaul from 2D doesn't diminish the vibrant personalities of the character animation, and it's added an even trippier dimension to the surreal backgrounds. More immersive, if you will, even if its episodic action gets no prizes for storytelling discipline."

Aparita Bhandari of The Globe and Mail gave the film 1.5 out of 4 stars, writing: "I totally understand if the latest SpongeBob SquarePants movie spinoff will draw in longtime fans and new audiences brave enough to venture into a movie theatre this Friday... However, for me and my two kids (aged 10 and 8), this dive into the deep sea wasn't as thrilling an adventure as we'd hoped for."

== Accolades ==
At the 19th Visual Effects Society Awards the special effects team was nominated in the category "Outstanding Animated Character in an Animated Feature".

The film was nominated for four Nickelodeon Kids' Choice Awards in 2022, one for Favorite Animated Movie and three for Favorite Voice in an Animated Movie: Tom Kenny as SpongeBob, Awkwafina as Otto, and Keanu Reeves as Sage.

== Future ==
=== Television spin-off ===
Kamp Koral: SpongeBob's Under Years is a SpongeBob SquarePants spin-off prequel series, based on the flashback scenes from Sponge on the Run, that introduces a 10-year-old SpongeBob at a summer sleepaway camp.

On February 19, 2020, the official title was revealed, and it was announced that the series would be premiering in July 2020. The main series voice cast reprise their roles.

On July 30, 2020, it was announced that the series would be released on CBS All Access, the ViacomCBS streaming service as it was known then, in early 2021. On January 28, 2021, it was announced that the first six episodes of the series would release on March 4, 2021, the same day as the release of Sponge on the Run as a launch series for the newly named Paramount+.

=== Film ===
On August 24, 2021, during a video interview with CEO of Nickelodeon, Brian Robbins, he mentioned that "a new SpongeBob [is] in the works" when discussing the studio's film slate. The film was officially announced in February 2022, with plans for it to be released theatrically. On November 10, 2022, the fourth film was given a release date of May 23, 2025. In April 2023, it was announced that the film would be titled The SpongeBob Movie: Search for SquarePants, with longtime series writer Derek Drymon directing the film. It follows SpongeBob as he travels to the depths of the ocean and faces off against the ghost of the Flying Dutchman. On October 23, 2023, the film's release date was pushed back to December 19, 2025, with Mission: Impossible – The Final Reckoning taking the May 2025 slot due to the 2023 SAG-AFTRA strike.
