= The Curse (What We Do in the Shadows) =

- What We Do in the Shadows episode
- Episode no.: Season 2 Episode 4
- Directed by: Liza Johnson
- Written by: Sarah Naftalis
- Cinematography by: DJ Stipsen
- Editing by: Yana Gorskaya; Dane McMaster
- Production code: XWS02004
- Original air date: April 29, 2020
- Running time: 22 minutes

Guest appearance
- Craig Robinson as Claude

Episode chronology
← Previous "Brain Scramblies"	Next → "Colin's Promotion"

"The Curse" is the fourth episode of the second season of the American mockumentary comedy horror television series What We Do in the Shadows, set in the franchise of the same name. It is the fourteenth overall episode of the series and was written by Sarah Naftalis, and directed by Liza Johnson. It was released on FX on April 29, 2020.

The series is set in Staten Island, New York City. Like the 2014 film, the series follows the lives of vampires in the city. These consist of three vampires, Nandor, Laszlo, and Nadja. They live alongside Colin Robinson, an energy vampire; and Guillermo, Nandor's familiar. The series explores the absurdity and misfortunes experienced by the vampires. In the episode, the vampires fear consequences as a chain email places a "curse" on them, while Guillermo gets involved with the vampire hunting group.

According to Nielsen Media Research, the episode was seen by an estimated 0.618 million household viewers and gained a 0.23 ratings share among adults aged 18–49. The episode received critical acclaim, who praised the humor, character development and performances (particularly Harvey Guillén), with many deeming it among the series' strongest episodes.

== Plot ==
Nandor (Kayvan Novak) checks his old letters, and then recalls his old Hotmail account. Guillermo (Harvey Guillén) supplies him with a computer to access his old account, which he hasn't opened in years. One of the messages is a chain email saying that he is cursed and will be killed unless he forwards it to ten people. Nandor, believing the curse to be legitimate, shows the email to Laszlo (Matt Berry) and Nadja (Natasia Demetriou).

Guillermo once again attends the vampire hunting group, intending to sabotage their operations. However, he panics when the group prepares to conduct a raid into a house that appears to be the vampires' house, despite Guillermo's protest. He calls the house to warn the vampires, but his whispered voice causes them to mistake him for the person who placed the curse. Desperate, they ask Colin Robinson (Mark Proksch) for help. He provides them with his email address so they forward it to him, as he intends to forward it to other employees at his office.

The vampire hunting group arrives at the house, which is a completely different house, calming Guillermo. They still break into the house, despite Guillermo's claims that the houseowners are not vampires. However, their claims prove to be true, as numerous vampire residents attack them. Guillermo escapes but returns to help the group, killing most of the vampires. While they escape, one of their members is killed. He returns home, where the vampires scold him for scaring them. While putting Nandor on his coffin, Guillermo stays with him until he falls asleep.

== Production ==
=== Development ===
In March 2020, FX confirmed that the fourth episode of the season would be titled "The Curse", and that it would be written by Sarah Naftalis, and directed by Liza Johnson. This was Naftalis' first writing credit, and Johnson's first directing credit.

== Reception ==
=== Viewers ===
In its original American broadcast, "The Curse" was seen by an estimated 0.618 million household viewers with a 0.23 in the 18-49 demographics. This means that 0.23 percent of all households with televisions watched the episode. This was a 9% increase in viewership from the previous episode, which was watched by 0.566 million household viewers with a 0.22 in the 18-49 demographics.

With DVR factored in, the episode was watched by 1.06 million viewers with a 0.4 in the 18-49 demographics.

=== Critical reviews ===
"The Curse" received critical acclaim. Katie Rife of The A.V. Club gave the episode an "A" grade and wrote, "The strong writing — both in terms of structure and in terms of jokes; I laughed out loud a lot this week — was complemented by the great direction in the assault on Disco Vampire Mansion, which added a lot of fun found-footage touches as the show briefly transformed into the climactic scene of a horror movie. But what put 'The Curse' over the top was Harvey Guillén's performance; he really acted his ass off this episode, going through a whole season's worth of emotions in less than 30 minutes."

Tony Sokol of Den of Geek gave the episode a perfect 5 star rating out of 5 and wrote, "'The Curse' may be the best episode of the series' run. It has everything: suspense, mayhem, action, ridiculous special effects and the eternal battle between monster and machine. It offers unforeseen riches of bloody comedy and ends on a very sweet note. Nandor exposes his vulnerability to Guillermo and we learn group hugs give Laszlo an erection." Greg Wheeler of The Review Geek gave the episode a perfect 5 star rating out of 5 and wrote, "More so here than the other ones we've seen this year, Shadows maintains a consistent amount of comedy dished out through its episode and almost every scene manages to advance the narrative or deliver the comedic goods. This is certainly one of the must-watch comedies of the year and this episode is definitely one of the best of the season so far."
