= Sandy Cheeks =

Fictional animated character from SpongeBob SquarePants

- SpongeBob SquarePants character
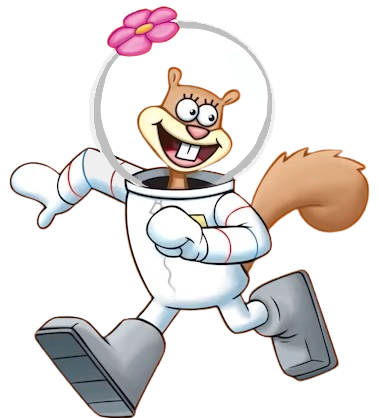
- First appearance: "Tea at the Treedome"; SpongeBob SquarePants; May 1, 1999
- Created by: Stephen Hillenburg
- Designed by: Stephen Hillenburg
- Voiced by: Carolyn Lawrence; Presley Williams (young; Sponge on the Run)
- Portrayed by: Lilli Cooper (Broadway) Christina Sajous (television special)

In-universe information
- Full name: Sandra Jennifer Cheeks (musical)
- Species: Squirrel
- Gender: Female
- Occupation: Scientist, inventor, karate master, bodybuilder, mechanic, rodeo champion
- Home: Houston, Texas
- Nationality: American

Sandy Cheeks is a fictional character in Nickelodeon's animated television series SpongeBob SquarePants. She is voiced by Carolyn Lawrence and first appeared in the episode "Tea at the Treedome", which premiered on May 1, 1999. She was created and designed by marine biologist and animator Stephen Hillenburg.

Sandy is a close friend of SpongeBob SquarePants and is portrayed as an intelligent anthropomorphic squirrel who wears an astronaut-like diving suit and lives underwater. She comes from Texas and speaks in a Southern drawl. In addition to her interest in science, she is skilled at several physical activities including karate, bodybuilding, and rodeo.

Sandy has appeared in many SpongeBob SquarePants publications, toys, and other merchandise. She also appears in the series' film adaptations and stage musical.

== Role in SpongeBob SquarePants ==
Sandy is a close friend of SpongeBob SquarePants, having met him upon being rescued from a giant clam. She is a proud Texan and speaks in a stereotypical Southern drawl. In order to live underwater, Sandy resides in a bubble-like dome and wears an atmospheric diving suit when outside her house. Inside the treedome, her normal attire consists of a green and purple bikini. Conversely, as revealed in "Tea at the Treedome", other characters must wear "water helmets" with opposite functionality when visiting her house. Sandy possesses extraordinary scientific skills such as the ability to construct complex inventions. Sandy is shown to possess a number of tough, tomboyish character traits and interests; she is skilled at karate, engages in bodybuilding, and is a rodeo champion. She is also a close friend of Patrick Star, SpongeBob's best friend and neighbor, though she sometimes gets annoyed by him like Squidward.

== History and development ==
=== Creation and design ===
Stephen Hillenburg first became fascinated with the ocean and began developing his artistic abilities as a child. During college, he majored in marine biology and minored in art. After graduating in 1984, he joined the Ocean Institute, an ocean education organization, where he had the idea to create a comic book titled The Intertidal Zone, which led to the creation of SpongeBob SquarePants. In 1987, Hillenburg left the institute to pursue a career in animation.

A few years after studying experimental animation at the California Institute of the Arts, Hillenburg met Joe Murray, creator of Rocko's Modern Life, at an animation festival. Murray offered Hillenburg a job as a director of the series. Martin Olson, one of the writers for Rocko's Modern Life, read The Intertidal Zone and encouraged Hillenburg to create a television series with a similar concept. At that point, Hillenburg had not considered creating his own series, but soon realized that this was his chance. Shortly after production on Rocko's Modern Life ended in 1996, Hillenburg began working on SpongeBob SquarePants.

Sandy has been shown in the episodes about her being in the tree dome. Whenever any aquatic creatures enter her home, they must wear helmets that are filled with water. Sandy works as a scientist, explorer, and inventor. She is also a rodeo champion with a number of athletic interests, such as "sand-boarding" and karate. Originally, in the pitch bible written by Tim Hill and Hillenburg, SpongeBob originally was a romantic interest for her, but this was quickly put out of the show.

=== Voice ===
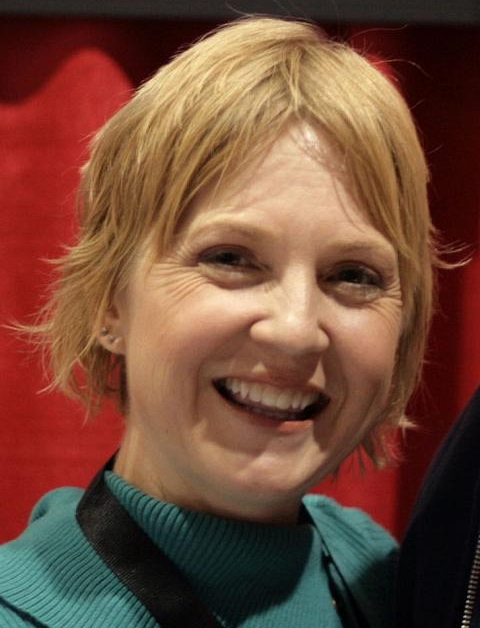
Actress Carolyn Lawrence provides the voice of Sandy Cheeks.

The voice of Sandy Cheeks is provided by Carolyn Lawrence. Lawrence got the role of Sandy when she was in Los Angeles at Los Feliz. She met Donna Grillo, a casting director, on a sidewalk. Lawrence was with a friend who knew Grillo, and she said Lawrence had an interesting voice. Grillo brought Lawrence in to audition and she got the part.

Before a recording, Lawrence prepares when the crew sends a storyboard. She explains, "I absolutely love that! Not only do I get to read the script, I can actually see what the artists have in mind. It is an amazing process and I feel so fortunate to be able to work that way! [...] I would prefer to let the script come alive in me before a taping."

Presley Williams voiced young Sandy in The SpongeBob Movie: Sponge on the Run.

== Reception ==
Film critic A. O. Scott of The New York Times said, in his review of The SpongeBob SquarePants Movie, that Sandy is one of his favorite characters on the show, along with Squidward Tentacles and Mrs. Puff. He wrote, "I was sorry to see [them] pushed to the margins".

In a 2019 interview with Salon, Carolyn Lawrence said that parents had told her they appreciated Sandy as a role model for both girls and boys. Lawrence credited Stephen Hillenburg with creating a multidimensional female character and said Sandy had not been written in a stereotypically female way.

Alex Casey of The Spinoff described Sandy as an "unsung hero of the deep" and highlighted the character's role as a scientist, inventor, independent female character, and unusually strong figure in the series.

Tara McNamara of Common Sense Media called Sandy a rare female depiction in animation, describing her as highly intelligent, athletic, fearless, considerate, caring, and fierce.

== In other media ==
Sandy has been included in various SpongeBob SquarePants-related merchandise, including board games, books, plush toys, and trading cards. She is also a playable character in several SpongeBob games like Battle for Bikini Bottom. Sandy also appears as a playable character in Nickelodeon All-Star Brawl. The Sandy's Blasting Bronco rollercoaster opened alongside the American Dream Mall's Nickelodeon Universe theme park in 2019. This ride is the first attraction to be named and themed after the character. The ride-vehicle is themed to Sandy's rocketship, from the SpongeBob SquarePants episode "Sandy's Rocket."

Sandy served as sideline reporter for Nickelodeon's alternate telecast of Super Bowl LVIII.

=== Saving Bikini Bottom: The Sandy Cheeks Movie ===
A CGI/live-action hybrid movie starring Sandy titled Saving Bikini Bottom: The Sandy Cheeks Movie was released on Netflix on August 2, 2024. This film was one of three character-centric SpongeBob movies in development for the streaming platform. It was initially announced in May 2021, and its title was revealed on November 26, 2022.

Critical response to the film was mixed. Catherine Bray of The Guardian described it as a SpongeBob spin-off centered on Sandy and called her a "beloved squirrel scientist". Bray also wrote that the film sent SpongeBob and Sandy to Sandy's home state of Texas and used science as one of its central themes.

Peter Debruge of Variety wrote that the film was not as inspired as adult viewers might want, but was harmless enough for children.
