= The SpongeBob SquarePants Movie =

2004 American film by Stephen Hillenburg

- Theatrical release poster
- Directed by: Stephen Hillenburg (Note: Live-action segments were directed by Mark Osborne.)
- Written by: Derek Drymon; Tim Hill; Stephen Hillenburg; Kent Osborne; Aaron Springer; Paul Tibbitt
- Story by: Stephen Hillenburg
- Based on: SpongeBob SquarePants by Stephen Hillenburg
- Produced by: Stephen Hillenburg; Julia Pistor
- Starring: Tom Kenny; Bill Fagerbakke; Clancy Brown; Rodger Bumpass; Mr. Lawrence; Alec Baldwin; David Hasselhoff; Scarlett Johansson; Jeffrey Tambor
- Cinematography: Jerzy Zieliński
- Edited by: Lynn Hobson
- Music by: Gregor Narholz
- Production companies: Paramount Pictures; Nickelodeon Movies; United Plankton Pictures
- Distributed by: Paramount Pictures (United States and Canada); United International Pictures (International)
- Release dates: November 14, 2004 (Grauman's Chinese Theatre); November 19, 2004 (United States)
- Running time: 87 minutes
- Country: United States
- Language: English
- Budget: $30 million
- Box office: $141 million

The SpongeBob SquarePants Movie is a 2004 American animated adventure comedy film co-written and directed by Stephen Hillenburg. Based on the television series SpongeBob SquarePants created by Hillenburg, the film features the series' regular voice cast, including Tom Kenny, Bill Fagerbakke, Clancy Brown, Rodger Bumpass and Mr. Lawrence, who are joined by Alec Baldwin, Scarlett Johansson and Jeffrey Tambor, with David Hasselhoff appearing in live action as himself. In the film, SpongeBob with Patrick sets out on a quest to Shell City to retrieve King Neptune's stolen crown, exonerate his boss Mr. Krabs, stop Plankton, and prove his manhood.

Hillenburg accepted an offer for a film adaptation of SpongeBob SquarePants from Paramount Pictures in 2002, after turning it down multiple times the previous year. He assembled a team from the show's writing staff, including himself, Derek Drymon, Tim Hill, Kent Osborne, Aaron Springer and Paul Tibbitt, and structured the film as a mythical hero's journey that would bring SpongeBob and Patrick to the surface. The film was originally intended to serve as the series finale, but due to its financial success, the show continued. Tibbitt took Hillenburg's place as showrunner afterwards.

The SpongeBob SquarePants Movie premiered at the Grauman's Chinese Theatre on November 14, 2004, and was released in the United States on November 19 by Paramount. It received generally positive reviews and grossed $141 million on a $30 million budget. It is the first in a series of SpongeBob films.

== Plot ==
Mr. Krabs opens a second location of the Krusty Krab, right next to the original. His fry cook, SpongeBob SquarePants, hopes to be promoted to manager of the new restaurant, but Krabs instead selects his co-worker, Squidward Tentacles, explaining to SpongeBob that he is a "kid" who is too young and immature to handle the position. Depressed, SpongeBob goes to the Goofy Goober ice cream parlor, where he indulges himself with ice cream with his best friend Patrick Star and wakes up the following morning with a hangover.

Krabs' rival Plankton, owner of the Chum Bucket restaurant, initiates "Plan Z" in an attempt to obtain the Krabby Patty secret formula and take over the world. He steals King Neptune's crown, sends it to a place called Shell City, and frames Krabs for the theft. Neptune confronts Krabs about his stolen crown and is convinced of Krabs' guilt when a hungover SpongeBob smears him. Recovering from his hangover, SpongeBob promises Neptune that he will retrieve the crown from Shell City. Neptune freezes Krabs until further notice, telling SpongeBob to return in ten days (until Patrick argues it down to six) or Krabs will be executed. Neptune's daughter, Mindy, encourages SpongeBob and Patrick but warns them of dangers surrounding Shell City, including "the Cyclops", a monster who kidnaps sea creatures.

SpongeBob and Patrick head for Shell City in the Patty Wagon, a Krabby Patty-shaped car stored underneath the restaurant. After the duo leave Bikini Bottom, Plankton steals the formula from the frozen Krabs and uses it to sell Krabby Patties. He distributes free helmets with the Krabby Patties that brainwash customers into doing Plankton's bidding, subsequently taking over Bikini Bottom and hiring a hitman named Dennis to prevent SpongeBob and Patrick from returning with the crown.

SpongeBob and Patrick encounter a hazardous trench, lose the Patty Wagon, and contemplate giving up. Mindy, whom Patrick has a crush on, appears and encourages them by applying fake mustaches made of seaweed, convincing them that she magically turned them from kids into men. Armed with newfound confidence, the two successfully traverse the trench and encounter Dennis on the other side. He demonstrates that the mustaches are fake, and prepares to squash the duo with his boot but is suddenly stepped on by a much larger boot belonging to the "Cyclops", a human diver, who abducts SpongeBob and Patrick.

The duo are placed under a heat lamp by the Cyclops, learning that they have arrived in "Shell City", a gift shop selling dried sea creatures. Proud that they reached their destination, they shed tears just before getting dried up, which short-circuit the lamp and activate the fire sprinkler system, reviving the two alongside the other dried sea creatures. While the sea creatures attack the Cyclops, SpongeBob and Patrick take the crown to the beach, where David Hasselhoff offers them a ride home. Dennis catches up and fights them on Hasselhoff's back, ultimately falling into the sea as Hasselhoff passes under a catamaran.

Neptune arrives to execute Krabs, but SpongeBob and Patrick return with the crown just in time. Plankton drops a mind-control helmet on Neptune and surrounds SpongeBob, Patrick and Mindy with his army of slaves. SpongeBob, embracing the fact that he's accomplished so much despite being a kid, uses the power of rock and roll to play "Goofy Goober Rock", freeing Neptune and the citizens of Bikini Bottom from Plankton's control.

As Plankton is arrested by the police, Neptune unfreezes Krabs and the two make amends. Krabs then appoints SpongeBob as the manager of the Krusty Krab 2.

== Cast ==
=== Voices ===
- Tom Kenny as:
  - SpongeBob SquarePants
    - Jim Wise provides SpongeBob's singing voice on "Goofy Goober Rock"
  - French Narrator
  - Gary the Snail
  - various other characters
- Bill Fagerbakke as Patrick Star and others
- Clancy Brown as Eugene Krabs
- Rodger Bumpass as:
  - Squidward Tentacles
  - Fish #4
- Mr. Lawrence as:
  - Sheldon J. Plankton
  - Various
- Alec Baldwin as Dennis
- Scarlett Johansson as Princess Mindy
- Jeffrey Tambor as King Neptune
- Jill Talley as:
  - Karen Plankton
  - Old Lady
- Carolyn Lawrence as Sandy Cheeks
- Mary Jo Catlett as Mrs. Puff

Other characters from the television series also appear in the film, including Pearl Krabs, voiced by Lori Alan. Other supporting voice actors include Carlos Alazraqui, Dee Bradley Baker, Sirena Irwin, Thomas F. Wilson and Joshua Seth. Neil Ross provides the Cyclops' vocal effects. Crew members Derek Drymon, Stephen Hillenburg and Aaron Springer make vocal cameo appearances.

=== Live-action ===
- David Hasselhoff as himself
- Aaron Hendry as the Cyclops (in-suit performer)

In a mid-credits scene, Mageina Tovah portrays a theater usher.

== Production ==
=== Development ===
The SpongeBob SquarePants Movie was long-planned, as Nickelodeon and Paramount Pictures had approached to series creator Stephen Hillenburg for a film based on SpongeBob SquarePants, but he refused for more than a year. Hillenburg was concerned, after watching The Iron Giant and Toy Story with his son, about the challenge of SpongeBob and Patrick doing something more cinematically consequential and inspiring without losing what he called the SpongeBob "cadence". Hillenburg believed that the film's story "had to be SpongeBob in a great adventure. That's where the comedy's coming from, having these two naïve characters, SpongeBob and Patrick, a doofus and an idiot, on this incredibly dangerous heroic odyssey with all the odds against them."

I never wanted to do a movie because I didn't think that what we wanted to say needed to be in a movie. I like the short form for animation. Then this story idea came up that lent itself to a longer format. You can't do a road trip adventure in a short form.

— Stephen Hillenburg

In 2002, Hillenburg and the show's staff stopped making episodes to work on the film after the show's third season was completed. When news of production on the film was announced, the show's staff made a joke plot for the film which had SpongeBob rescue Patrick from a fisherman in Florida; a reference to the plot of Finding Nemo. Hillenburg directed and produced the film, and also co-wrote the screenplay with five other writer-animators from the show (Paul Tibbitt, Derek Drymon, Aaron Springer, Kent Osborne and Tim Hill) over a three-month period in a room of a former Glendale, California bank. At the beginning of the series, Hillenburg screened a number of silent shorts (from Laurel and Hardy, Charlie Chaplin and Buster Keaton) and work by two modern comic actors: Jerry Lewis and Pee-wee Herman, both obvious inspirations for SpongeBob. For the film, the writers created a mythical hero's quest: the search for a stolen crown, which brings SpongeBob and Patrick to the surface. Bill Fagerbakke (the voice of Patrick) said about the plot, "It's just nuts. I'm continually dazzled and delighted with what these guys came up with."

When the film was completed, Hillenburg wanted to end the series "so it wouldn't jump the shark", citing concerns among Nickelodeon executives that the show "had peaked". However, Nickelodeon could not afford to end the show leading to its continuation due to its massive financial success. As a result, Hillenburg resigned as the series' showrunner, appointing writer, director and storyboard artist Paul Tibbitt to succeed him, as Tibbitt was one of Hillenburg's favorite crew members and was "totally trusted". Tibbitt would remain showrunner until he was succeeded in 2015 by the show's creative director Vincent Waller and staff writer Marc Ceccarelli. He also acted as an executive producer from 2008 to 2018. While Hillenburg was no longer involved in the writing process or directly overall running the show on a day-to-day basis, he reviewed each episode and submitted suggestions: "I figure when I'm pretty old I can still paint, I don't know about running shows." In 2015, Hillenburg returned to the show following the completion of the second film as an executive producer, having greater creative input and attending crew meetings until his death on November 26, 2018.

The film was dedicated to Jules Engel, Hillenburg's mentor when he studied experimental animation at the California Institute of the Arts, who died in 2003 during production.

=== Casting ===
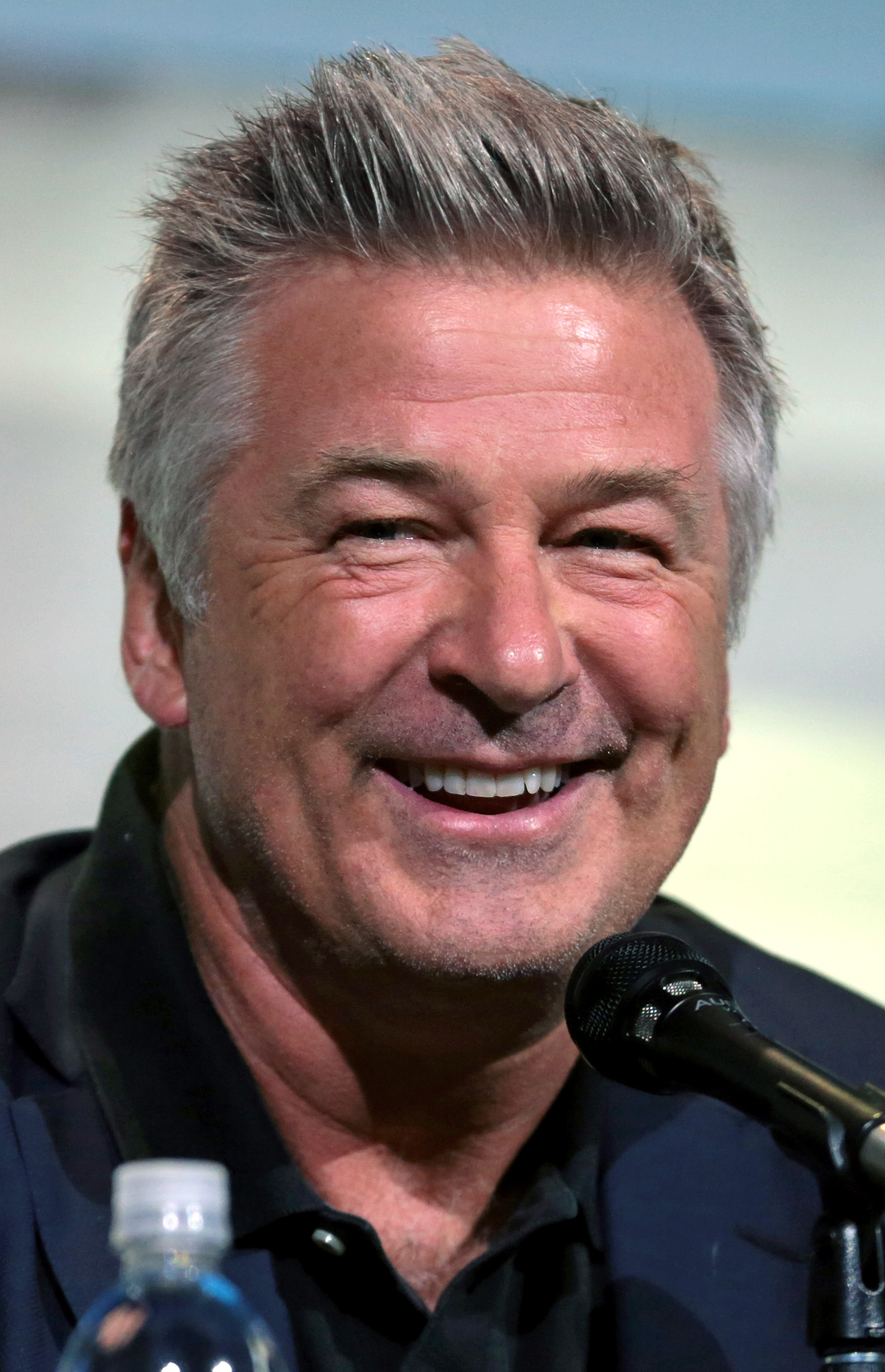
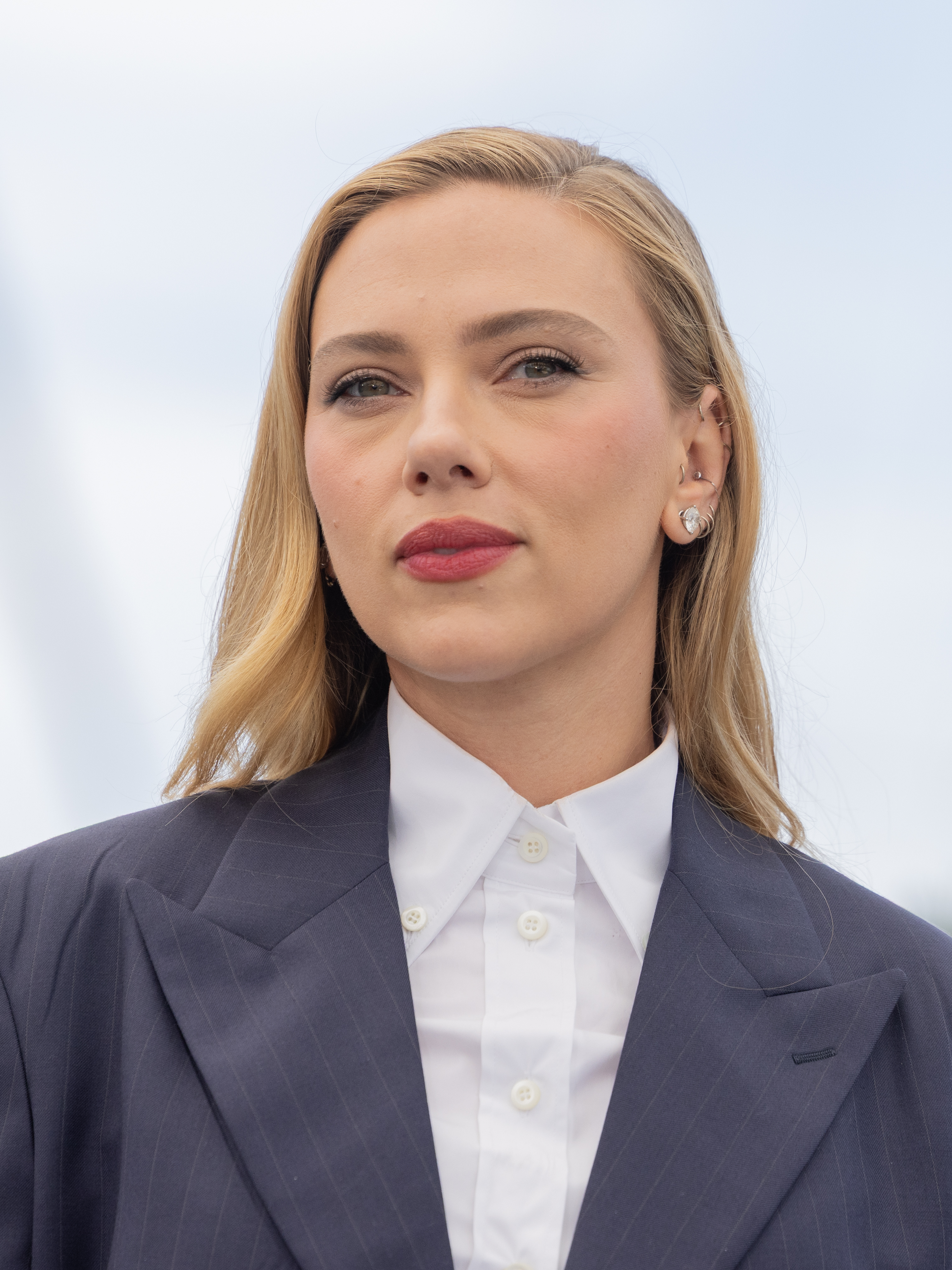
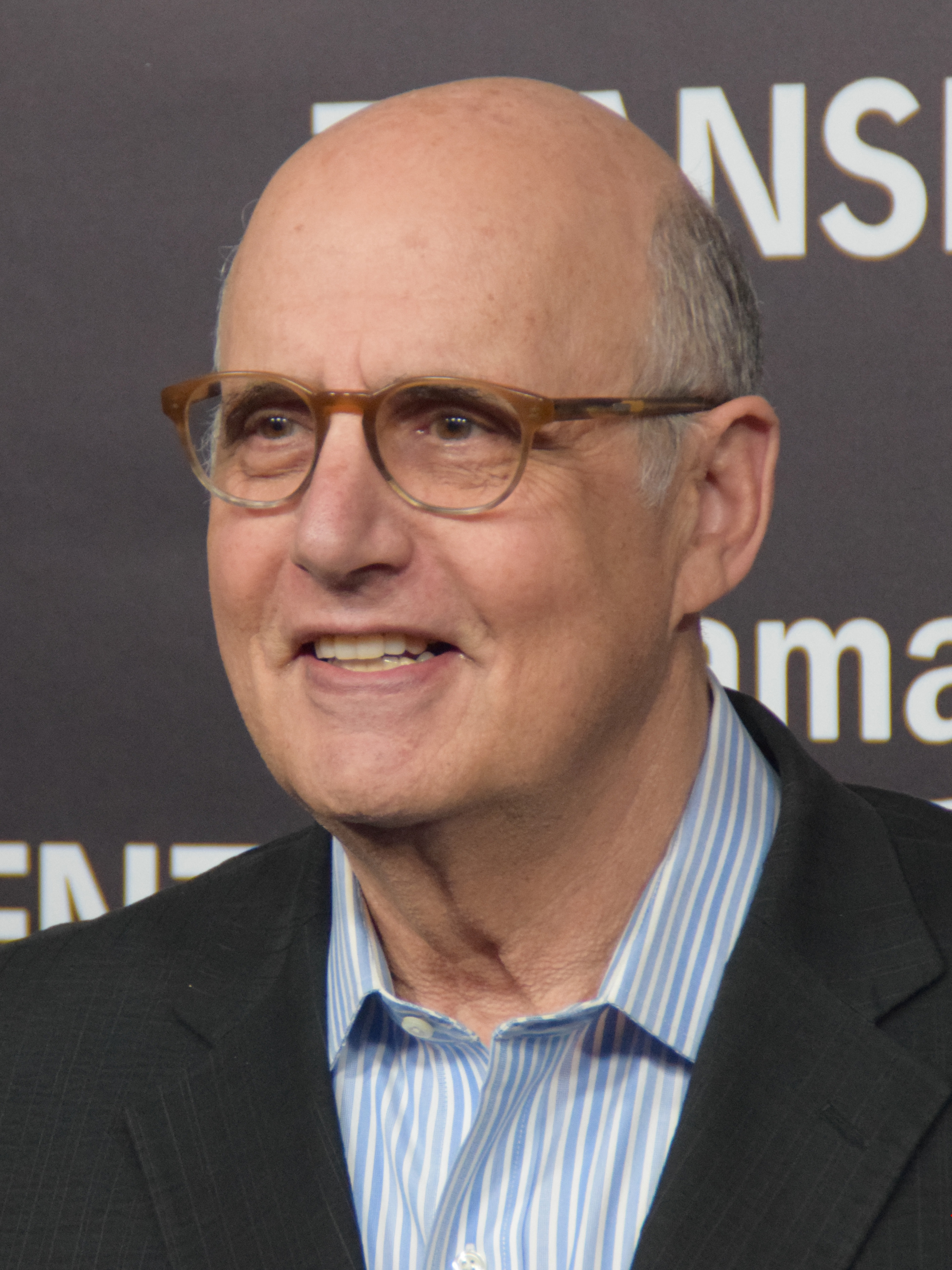
Alec Baldwin, Scarlett Johansson and Jeffrey Tambor voice new characters: Dennis, Princess Mindy and King Neptune.

The film stars the series' main cast members: Tom Kenny as SpongeBob SquarePants, Gary the Snail, and the French Narrator, Bill Fagerbakke as Patrick Star, Rodger Bumpass as Squidward Tentacles, Clancy Brown as Mr. Krabs, Mr. Lawrence as Plankton, Jill Talley as Karen, Carolyn Lawrence as Sandy Cheeks, Mary Jo Catlett as Mrs. Puff, and Lori Alan as Pearl Krabs. It also features Dee Bradley Baker as Perch Perkins, Carlos Alazraqui as King Neptune's squire, Aaron Hendry as the Cyclops, and Neil Ross as the voice of the Cyclops. In addition to the series' cast, the film stars Scarlett Johansson, Jeffrey Tambor and Alec Baldwin who voice Princess Mindy, King Neptune and Dennis, respectively, with a cameo appearance by David Hasselhoff.

Johansson accepted the role because she liked cartoons and was a fan of The Ren & Stimpy Show. When Tambor signed for his voice cameo, he noted the similarities between himself and the character King Neptune, including the fact that he himself is bald. Stephen Hillenburg said that Baldwin recorded his character Dennis from New York City over the phone.

Hasselhoff accepted the role when his daughters, Taylor-Ann and Hayley, urged him as the two were big fans of the show. Hasselhoff enjoyed his cameo, noting that to this day, kids would still recognize him from his cameo in the film, adding that they "didn't see Baywatch and Knight Rider".

=== Animation ===
The animation process of the film started with ideas drawn on Post-it notes, which the writers drew from, working from rough outlines rather than scripts (which made the humor more visual than verbal). The storyboard artists, including Sherm Cohen, then illustrated ideas conceived by the writers. Hillenburg and Drymon did the animatics for the film, taking over from Tom Yasumi and Andrew Overtoom in the series, both of whom worked on the film as animation timing directors. The SpongeBob SquarePants Movie, like the series, was animated at Rough Draft Studios in South Korea. The animators worked semi-digitally with pencil-drawn poses that would be composited into layouts in Photoshop.

Series writer and storyboard artist Erik Wiese returned to do storyboards and character layout for the film, after leaving the show for a year to work on Samurai Jack and Danny Phantom. He "always wanted to be a feature animator, and the movie felt like I was on the character animation end", describing the experience as "a blast it felt like coming home."

Hillenburg enjoyed the process of making the film: "The TV schedule is tight, and you don't always have a lot of time to work on your drawings." He appreciated the film's hand-drawn animation: "I think the movie's drawings are much superior than the TV show", although CGI animation was flourishing at the time of the film's release. "There's a lot of talk about 2-D being dead, and I hope people don't think that. Even Brad Bird is a proponent of 2-D. He would agree with me that it's all about what you're trying to say. There are many ways to tell a story, and what's unique about animation is that there are many styles with which to tell a story." The clay animation scenes were shot by Mark Caballero, Seamus Walsh and Chris Finnegan at Screen Novelties in Los Angeles.

=== Filming ===
The film features live-action scenes directed by Mark Osborne in Santa Monica, California. The ship used during the 30-second opening featuring the pirates singing the theme song was the Bounty, a 180-foot-long (55 m), enlarged reconstruction of the 1787 Royal Navy sailing ship HMS Bounty built for Mutiny on the Bounty (1962). The ship appeared in a number of other films, including Treasure Island (1999), Pirates of the Caribbean: Dead Man's Chest (2006) and Pirates of the Caribbean: At World's End (2007). In film trailers, live-action scenes were taken from Das Boot (1981), The Hunt for Red October (1990) and U-571 (2000).

The crew built a larger-than-life replica of David Hasselhoff as his double in filming the fight scene with Dennis.

David Hasselhoff made a cameo appearance in the live-action scenes, offering SpongeBob and Patrick a ride to Bikini Bottom. The scene was originally written before consulting Hasselhoff. Hillenburg was pleased with the storyboards; Lead storyboard artist Sherm Cohen noted the positive reaction among the film's storyboard artists after Hillenburg brought up the animatic of the scene. Hillenburg and the staff were counting on casting Hasselhoff, who eventually agreed before seeing the script. Hillenburg said about the actor, "He's a great guy. ... He was great at making fun of himself."

The crew built a 750-pound (340 kg), 12-foot (3.7 m) replica of Hasselhoff. The $100,000 replica was kept at Hasselhoff's home after completion of filming; he has said, "It freaked me out because it was so lifelike, with teeth, when you touch it it feels like real skin." Hasselhoff filmed in cold water, where he was pulled by a sled nine yards across the sea.

In late March 2014, Hasselhoff offered the replica up for auction with other memorabilia collected during his career. Julien's Auctions handled the item's sale, which was expected to bring in between $20,000 and $30,000. Ultimately, Hasselhoff pulled the item, just a few days before the auction.

=== Deleted scenes ===
Animatic of deleted scene, with SpongeBob and Patrick (right) encountering Sandy Cheeks (left) on the surface

The DVD and Blu-ray releases include animatics of deleted scenes from the film, including SpongeBob and Patrick's meeting with Sandy Cheeks (a squirrel) on the surface after they escape from Shell City. Patrick repeatedly vomits, upset by Sandy's unusual appearance. Sandy is pursued by black-suited exterminators, and defends herself with acorns. She informs SpongeBob and Patrick that they can return to Bikini Bottom by taking a bus at the beach. This idea was later used for the second film The SpongeBob Movie: Sponge Out of Water (2015), where Sandy became a giant realistic squirrel.

In 2013, the film's lead storyboard artist, Sherm Cohen, released a storyboard panel of a deleted scene from the film with SpongeBob awakening from his dream saying "WEEEEE!" and Mr. Krabs holding a manager's hat.

== Themes ==
One key theme of the film is the recognition of the power of childhood. While Mr. Krabs denies SpongeBob promotion because he is "just a kid," it is his kid nature that saves the day in the climax of the film. As Shannon Brownlee observes, "The SpongeBob SquarePants Movie represents a victory of childhood over adulthood" and the "power of childhood over that of adult masculinity." Instead of being called a boy, SpongeBob is called the gender neutral term kid. As Rebecca Rowe explains, the term "kid" emphasizes play and rebelliousness in its cultural understanding. It is this playfulness and rebelliousness, as well as other characteristics of children such as wonder, that enables SpongeBob to succeed.

== Soundtrack ==
Gregor Narholz composed the score for the film, conducting the recording sessions with the London Metropolitan Orchestra at Abbey Road Studios in London. Narholz was signed when series music editor Nick Carr recommended him to Hillenburg after they worked together at Associated Production Music. Narholz was honored at the 2005 ASCAP Film and Television Music Awards for his work on the film, and received a nomination for Music in an Animated Feature Production at the 32nd Annie Awards.

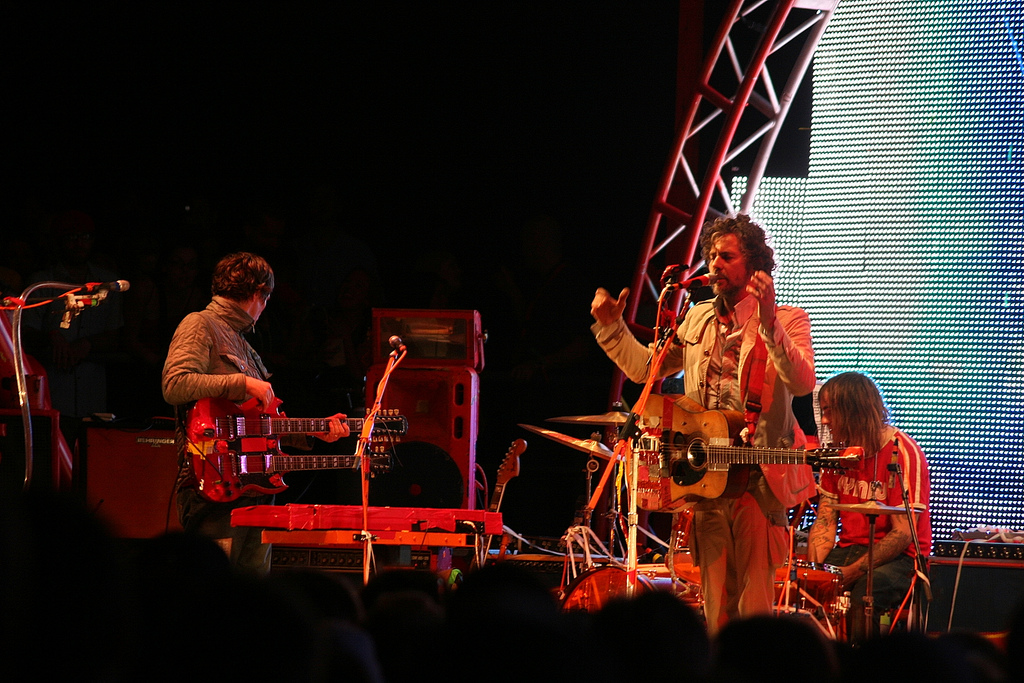
The Flaming Lips recorded "SpongeBob & Patrick Confront the Psychic Wall of Energy".

American rock band The Flaming Lips recorded "SpongeBob And Patrick Confront the Psychic Wall of Energy". They shot the song's music video, directed by band member Wayne Coyne and filmmaker Bradley Beesley, in Austin, Texas. Coyne said, "Stephen Hillenburg seems to be a fan of the weirder music of the late '80s and early '90s. He wanted to evoke the music he got turned onto back then." Coyne suggested a duet with Justin Timberlake, but Hillenburg refused, not wanting any of "those sort of commercial weirdos" in the soundtrack, preferring to stick with the music he liked. American band Wilco wrote and recorded "Just a Kid". One of the film's producers contacted frontman Jeff Tweedy after seeing a SpongeBob air freshener hanging from Tweedy's rearview mirror in I Am Trying to Break Your Heart: A Film About Wilco (2002). Tweedy could not pass up the opportunity to take part in the soundtrack, noting that he "fell in love with SpongeBob when [Tweedy] heard him describe the darkness at the bottom of the sea as 'advanced darkness'." Avril Lavigne recorded the series' theme for the soundtrack. Other artists contributing to the soundtrack were Motörhead, singing "You Better Swim" (a derivative of their 1992 song "You Better Run"); Prince Paul ("Prince Paul's Bubble Party"); Ween ("Ocean Man"), and the Shins ("They'll Soon Discover", partially written in 2001).

"The Best Day Ever", written by Tom Kenny (SpongeBob's voice actor) and Andy Paley, was featured in the film and on its soundtrack. Kenny and Paley were working on what would become the album The Best Day Ever, writing "The Best Day Ever" and "Under My Rock". The film's production team needed two more tracks for the soundtrack; Hillenburg heard the songs, and decided to include them. "The Best Day Ever" ended up being played during the film's closing credits.

== Marketing ==
=== Promotion ===
Julia Pistor, the film's co-producer, said that although Nickelodeon wanted to sell character-themed backpacks, lunch boxes and wristwatches it respected Hillenburg's integrity and gave him control of merchandising. Hillenburg had no problem with candy and ice cream tie-ins, Pistor said (because of the treats' simplicity), but he had issues with fast-food tie-ins; according to him, the latter was "full of hidden additives." Pistor noted that it was difficult to market an animated film without a fast-food tie-in. Hillenburg insisted to keep his marketing strategy as-is, saying "We didn't want to suddenly become the people serving up food that's not that good for you, especially kids. We work with Burger King, and they make toys and watches. But to actually take the step of pushing the food, that's crossing the line." Variety estimated the media value was $150 million.

The film's promotion in the United States included a 12-figure toy line based on the film from Burger King, and about 4,700 of the chain's stores perched 9-foot (2.7 m), inflatable SpongeBob figures on their roofs as part of the promotion (one of the largest in fast-food history).

In the weeks since the start of the film's promotion, a number of the inflatables had been stolen from Burger King roofs nationwide. The motive behind these particular thefts have not been determined, according to Burger King's chief marketing officer Russ Klein. The chain offered a year's supply of Whopper sandwiches as a reward for information leading to the return of inflatables stolen in November. One was found attached to a railing at the football-field 50-yard line at an Iowa college, another under a bed in Virginia, and a third with an attached ransom note. Steven Simon and Conrad (C.J.) Mercure Jr. were arrested after stealing an inflatable from a Burger King in St. Mary's County, Maryland. While facing up to 18 months in jail and a $500 fine, Simon and Mercure said they were proud of what they did. The following year, Burger King took "extra security precautions" in response to the SpongeBob incident, when Stormtroopers from George Lucas' Star Wars guarded the delivery of Star Wars toys to a Burger King in North Hollywood as part of a promotion for the premiere of Revenge of the Sith.

The Cayman Islands joined with Nickelodeon to create the first Cayman Islands Sea School with SpongeBob for the film. The partnership was announced by Pilar Bush, deputy director of Tourism for the Cayman Islands, on March 10, 2004. As part of the agreement, the Cayman partnership was seen on Nickelodeon's global multimedia platforms, including on-air, online, and in magazines. Other promotional partners included Mitsubishi, Holiday Inn, Kellogg's, and Perfetti Van Melle.

In 2005, Nickelodeon and Simon Spotlight released a book, Ice-Cream Dreams, as a tie-in to the film. It was written by Nancy E. Krulik and illustrated by Heather Martinez, with Krulik and Derek Drymon as contributors.

=== SpongeBob SquarePants Movie 300 ===
On October 15, 2004, the film was the first to sponsor a NASCAR race: the 300-mile (480 km), Busch Series SpongeBob SquarePants Movie 300 at Charlotte Motor Speedway in North Carolina. It was the first race of its kind where children at the track could listen to a special, "kid-friendly" radio broadcast of the event.

Kyle Busch and Jimmie Johnson debuted a pair of SpongeBob SquarePants-themed Chevrolet race cars in the race. Johnson's No. 48 Chevrolet included an image of SpongeBob across the hood, and Busch's No. 5 Chevrolet featured Patrick Star.

== Release ==
=== Theatrical ===
The SpongeBob SquarePants Movie held its premiere on November 14, 2004, at Grauman's Chinese Theatre in Los Angeles, and featured a yellow carpet. Among celebrities who saw the premiere with their children were Ray Romano, Larry King, Ice Cube, Gary Dourdan and Lisa Kudrow. It was later released in the United States on November 19.

=== Home media ===
The film was released on VHS and DVD on March 1, 2005, in wide- and full-screen editions, by Paramount Home Entertainment. The VHS release is known for being the last animated film by Nickelodeon Movies to be released on the platform. The DVD special features include an 18-minute featurette, The Absorbing Tale Behind The SpongeBob SquarePants Movie, featuring interviews with most of the principal cast and crew; a 15-minute featurette, Case of the Sponge "Bob", hosted by Jean-Michel Cousteau; a 20-minute animatic segment featuring scenes from the film with dialogue by the original artists, and the film's trailer. As a tie-in to the film's DVD release, 7-Eleven served a limited-edition Under-the-Sea Pineapple Slurpee in March 2005.

The film was released as a Blu-ray-plus-DVD combination pack on March 29, 2011, alongside Charlotte's Web. It was re-released on DVD and Blu-ray on December 30, 2014. A 4K Ultra HD Blu-ray was released on July 16, 2024, to commemorate the film's 20th anniversary.

== Reception ==
=== Box office ===
The SpongeBob SquarePants Movie earned $9,559,752 on its opening day in the United States. The film grossed a combined total of $32,018,216 during its opening weekend on 4,300 screens at 3,212 theaters, while averaging $9,968 per venue (or $7,446 per screen), placing second behind National Treasure ($35.1 million). It dropped an unexpected 44 percent over the Thanksgiving weekend, and 57 percent the weekend after that. The opening weekend earned 37.48 percent of the film's final gross.

It closed on March 24, 2005, after grossing $85,417,988 in the United States and $54,865,907 internationally, resulting in a total of $140,284,309 worldwide. Despite failing to out-gross holiday animated competitors The Incredibles ($261,441,092) and The Polar Express ($183,373,735), the film was still profitable for distributor Paramount Pictures and producer Nickelodeon Movies, as it was able to recoup its budget of $30 million.

=== Critical response ===
On review aggregation website Rotten Tomatoes, 68% of 124 critics' reviews are positive, with an average rating of 6.3/10. The website's consensus reads, "Surreally goofy and entertaining for both children and their parents." Metacritic, which uses a weighted average, assigned the film a score of 67 out of 100, based on 32 critics, indicating "generally favorable" reviews. Audiences polled by CinemaScore gave the film an average grade of "B+" on an A+ to F scale.

Roger Ebert of the Chicago Sun-Times gave the film three stars out of four, calling it "the Good Burger of animation plopping us down inside a fast-food war being fought by sponges, starfish, crabs, tiny plankton and mighty King Neptune." Ed Park of The Village Voice wrote, "No Pixar? No problem! An unstoppable good-mood generator, the resolutely 2-D [The] SpongeBob SquarePants Movie has more yuks than Shark Tale (2004) and enough soul to swallow The Polar Express whole." Michael Rechtshaffen of The Hollywood Reporter gave the film a positive review, calling it "an animated adventure that's funnier than Shark Tale and more charming than The Polar Express." Randy Cordova of The Arizona Republic said, "Like the TV show it's based on, it's a daffy, enjoyable creation." Jami Bernard of the New York Daily News gave the feature a score of three out of four: "It's not The Incredibles, or one of those animated features that spent zillions on character design, pedigree and verisimilitude. But SpongeBob is a sweet, silly thing with a child-friendly esthetic all its own." Will Lawrence of Empire gave the film four out of five stars, calling it "a film for kids, students, stoners, anyone who enjoys a break from reality." Lisa Schwarzbaum of Entertainment Weekly gave it a B-minus grade: "The best moments in his [SpongeBob SquarePants] first movie outing are those that feel most TV-like, just another day in the eternally optimistic undersea society created with such contagious silliness by Stephen Hillenburg." Desson Thomson of The Washington Post enjoyed the film: "You gotta love SpongeBob. Coolest sponge in the sea, although this one has a suspiciously manufactured look."

Carla Meyer of the San Francisco Chronicle wrote that "The SpongeBob SquarePants Movie retains the 2-D charm of the hugely popular Nickelodeon cartoon but adds a few tricks a little 3-D here, a little David Hasselhoff there. The series' appeal never lay in its visuals, however. 'SpongeBob' endeared itself to kids and adults through sweetness and cleverness, also abundant here." A. O. Scott of The New York Times gave it a score of four out of five: "If you're tired of bluster and swagger, SpongeBob is your man." Tom Maurstad of The Dallas Morning News also gave the film a B-minus grade: "Being so good is what led to making the movie, and it's also the reason that many small-screen episodes are better than this big-screen venture."

Some reviews praised David Hasselhoff's appearance in the film. Jennifer Frey of The Washington Post wrote, "Getting to see the hairs on Hasselhoff's back (and thighs, and calves) magnified exponentially is perhaps a bit creepy. Like the movie, it's all in good fun." Cinema Blend founder Joshua Tyler called Hasselhoff's role "the best movie cameo I've seen since Fred Savage stuck a joint in his crotch and played a clarinet to charm the resulting smoke like a snake."

There's plenty to treasure in The SpongeBob SquarePants Movie, but for all the spit-and-polish animation and the rollicking soundtrack (which includes an original song by the Flaming Lips, as well as Ween's gorgeous "Ocean Man," from their Mollusk album), this isn't the yellow one's most thrilling hour—or 80 minutes."

— David Edelstein, in his Slate review

David Edelstein of Slate criticized the film's plot, calling it a "big, heavy anchor of a story structure to weigh him down." Mike Clark of USA Today called it "harmlessly off-the-cuff—but facing far more pedigreed multiplex competition—SpongeBob barely rates as OK when compared with The Incredibles." A reviewer noted in Time Out London, "Anyone expecting anything more risky will be sadly disappointed." In his Variety review, Todd McCarthy said the film "takes on rather too much water during its extended feature-length submersion."

=== Accolades ===
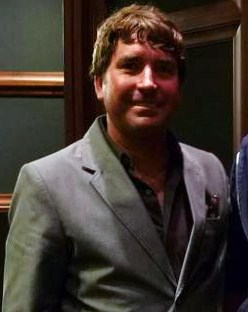
Director Stephen Hillenburg was nominated at the 32nd Annie Awards for Directing an Animated Feature Production.

=== Fan project ===
External videos
- The SpongeBob SquarePants Movie Rehydrated!

In honor of Stephen Hillenburg, a non-profit reanimated collaboration project, titled The SpongeBob SquarePants Movie Rehydrated, was released online on May 1, 2022. Similarly to 3GI's Shrek Retold collaboration, the video consists of over 300 artists recreating the film's animation and audio in their own artistic styles. Amid the YouTube premiere, the video was taken down by Paramount Global due to copyright laws. As a result, the hashtag #JusticeForSpongeBob became trending on Twitter against Paramount's action. The video was restored the following day.

== Video game ==
A video game based on the film was released for PlayStation 2, PC, Game Boy Advance, Xbox, and GameCube on October 27, 2004 for Mac OS X in 2005 and PlayStation 3 on February 7, 2012. The home-console version was developed by Heavy Iron Studios; the Game Boy Advance version was developed by WayForward Technologies and published by THQ.

It was created on the same engine as SpongeBob SquarePants: Battle for Bikini Bottom, which uses RenderWare. Game developer Heavy Iron Studios tweaked the graphics to give the game a sharper and more imaginative look than Battle for Bikini Bottom. It increased the polygon count, added several racing levels, and incorporated many creatures from the film. The game's plot was based on the film, with SpongeBob and Patrick on a mission taking them outside Bikini Bottom to retrieve Neptune's crown. A mobile version, developed by Amplified Games, was also released.

== Standalone sequels ==
=== The SpongeBob Movie: Sponge Out of Water ===
A second movie, which was announced in February 2012, was directed by Paul Tibbitt, written by Jonathan Aibel and Glenn Berger, and executive-produced by Stephen Hillenburg, who co-wrote the story with Tibbit. Paramount stated in early June 2014 that the film would be released on February 6, 2015. The film involves SpongeBob, Patrick, Squidward, Mr. Krabs, Plankton and Sandy taking back the Krabby Patty secret formula from a pirate that stole it, resulting in them making it to land.

=== The SpongeBob Movie: Sponge on the Run ===
The third movie, The SpongeBob Movie: Sponge on the Run, was announced in late 2019 and was released on August 14, 2020, in Canada and on March 4, 2021, on Paramount+ in the United States. Tim Hill served as the director and the screenplay was written by Aaron Springer with Jonathan Aibel and Glenn Berger. The film follows SpongeBob and Patrick on a rescue mission to save Gary, and reveals how SpongeBob and Gary met at Kamp Koral.

=== The SpongeBob Movie: Search for SquarePants ===
A fourth theatrical SpongeBob film was officially confirmed to be in development in February 2022. The film initially began development as a direct-to-streaming film focused on Mr. Krabs. In April 2023, during Paramount Pictures' CinemaCon panel, it was announced that the film would be titled The SpongeBob Movie: Search for SquarePants, with series veteran Derek Drymon set to direct the film. In April 2024, it was reported that the show's regular voice cast of Tom Kenny, Clancy Brown, Rodger Bumpass, Bill Fagerbakke, Carolyn Lawrence, and Mr. Lawrence would reprise their roles. In July, Mark Hamill revealed that he would be voicing The Flying Dutchman, replacing long-time voice actor Brian Doyle-Murray. Pam Brady and Lisa Stewart would serve as producers. It was released in theaters on December 19, 2025.

== Literature ==
- 2004: Marc Cerasini: SpongeBob SquarePants Movie: A novelization of the hit movie!, Simon Spotlight, ISBN 978-0689868405
