= Krusty Krab Training Video =

- SpongeBob SquarePants episode
- Title card
- Episode no.: Season 3 Episode 10b
- Directed by: Aaron Springer (storyboard director); C.H. Greenblatt (storyboard director); Caleb Meurer (storyboard artist); Nicholas R. Jennings (art); Frank Weiss (animation); Alan Smart (supervising); Derek Drymon (creative)
- Written by: Aaron Springer; C. H. Greenblatt; Kent Osborne
- Editing by: Brian Robitaille (animatic); Lynn Hobson (picture); Margaret Hou (picture)
- Production code: 5572-198
- Original air date: May 10, 2002

Guest appearance
- Steve Kehela as the narrator

Episode chronology
← Previous "Wet Painters"	Next → "Party Pooper Pants"
- SpongeBob SquarePants (season 3)

"Krusty Krab Training Video" is the second segment of the tenth episode of the third season of the American animated television series SpongeBob SquarePants, and the second part of the 50th episode overall, as well as the show's 100th segment. The episode was written by Aaron Springer, C. H. Greenblatt, and Kent Osborne, and the animation was directed by Frank Weiss. Springer and Greenblatt also served as storyboard directors, and Caleb Meurer served as storyboard artist. The segment originally aired on Nickelodeon in the United States on May 10, 2002.

The series follows the adventures of SpongeBob SquarePants and his friends in the underwater city of Bikini Bottom. In this segment, SpongeBob is depicted as a trainee in an industrial training video for new employees of the Krusty Krab. The video details the beginnings of the restaurant, its various implements, and what it takes to become a good Krusty Krab employee.

== Plot ==
The episode is formatted as an industrial training video, and it begins with a narrator (Steve Kehela) congratulating the newly hired employee of the Krusty Krab, SpongeBob SquarePants. SpongeBob proceeds to ask if he can make a Krabby Patty, but is denied as he has to undergo training first. The narrator then shares how the restaurant came to be, with its founder, Mr. Krabs, previously suffering from a long depression after "the war" before deciding to acquire a bankrupt retirement home and turn it into the Krusty Krab.

In the present day, the restaurant has since tried to modernize itself and maintain customer satisfaction by acquiring the "latest" fast food technology, such as the spatula and the cash register. For the restaurant's employees, the narrator differentiates the characteristics of a potentially good employee and a bad employee through the examples and actions of SpongeBob and Squidward respectively, and among the most important things to learn on the job is the acronym "P.O.O.P." (short for "People Order Our Patties"). Other matters discussed by the narrator include personal hygiene, the work station, and how to interact with the manager Mr. Krabs, all while SpongeBob impatiently awaits the chance to make a Krabby Patty.

After all the basics of being an employee have been covered, the narrator asks SpongeBob if he is ready to prepare a Krabby Patty. SpongeBob vigorously nods in affirmation, but before the narrator begins to tell the Krabby Patty secret formula, the training video abruptly cuts to the credits.

== Release ==
"Krusty Krab Training Video" originally aired on Nickelodeon in the United States on May 10, 2002.

For home media, the episode was first made available as part of the SpongeBob SquarePants DVD release titled "SpongeBob SquarePants: Sponge for Hire" on November 2, 2004. Later, it was released on the "SpongeBob SquarePants: The Complete 3rd Season" DVD collection on September 27, 2005.

In October 2019, a five-minute edit of the episode was released on the online platform YouTube by the official SpongeBob SquarePants YouTube account.

== Reception ==
On the tenth anniversary of the SpongeBob series, Priya Elan of The Guardian ranked the episode at No. 1 on his top five favorite SpongeBob "moments", stating that it is "[a]mazing on many levels. From the 'bankrupt retirement homes' to P.O.O.P. to the moment Patrick tries to place an order." Jaclyn Kessel of Decider ranked "Krusty Krab Training Video" at No. 5 in her "10 Essential SpongeBob SquarePants Episodes" list, stating that "This episode shines because I can honestly say I've never seen anything like this in any show before.... The abrupt ending of this episode brilliantly prevents us from ever learning what is in the Krusty Krab secret sauce." Madeline Kaplan from Slate, in contributing to the site's list of the best SpongeBob episodes, wrote that "One of my strongest memories of the pre-streaming era is of watching "Krusty Krab Training Video" and waiting [...] for Nickelodeon to air it again.... This segment, and many other SpongeBob episodes, taught me to love weird comedy." IGN also listed the episode as one of their staff's favorite SpongeBob episodes. In 2021, Jordan Moreau, Katcy Stephan and David Viramontes of Variety ranked the episode as the seventh-best SpongeBob episode, describing it as "a perfect example of how the show mixes mediums, presenting portions in hand-drawn animation, CG art styles and live-action elements."

Tom Kenny, who voices SpongeBob in the series, considers it one of his favorite episodes, listing it No. 15 on the iTunes release "SpongeBob SquarePants: Tom Kenny's Top 20".

=== Awards ===
During the 2003 Golden Reel Awards, both "Wet Painters" and "Krusty Krab Training Video" won the award for "Best Sound Editing in Television Episode – Music", with Nicolas Carr representing the series.
