= SpongeBob SquarePants fan theories =

SpongeBob SquarePants is an American animated television series created by marine biologist Stephen Hillenburg. Since the show's debut in 1999 on Nickelodeon, numerous fan theories, or assumptions about the show and its characters, have been made, with some being regarded as "weird".

== Fan theories ==
Theories about the Krabby Patty secret formula

The Krabby Patty is a veggie burger sold by the Krusty Krab, a fictional restaurant in SpongeBob SquarePants. Numerous theories have spawned of what the Krabby Patty secret formula is made out of, ranging from completely nothing to cocaine. A notable theory about the Krabby Patty secret formula explains that Krabby Patties are made out of crab meat. Support for this theory comes from the season 3 episode "Mid-Life Crustacean", in which Mr. Krabs states, "So that's what I taste like," upon eating a Krabby Patty. In 2017, the series's creator Stephen Hillenburg confirmed that the Krabby Patty contained no animal products, thus debunking the crab meat theory. Another theory explains that the Krabby Patty secret formula is made out of "Poseidon Powder", which according to Urban Dictionary, is slang for cocaine.

=== Theories about the characters of SpongeBob SquarePants ===
Some notable theories about the main characters of SpongeBob SquarePants include:

- Seven deadly sins theory: A theory explaining that the main characters of SpongeBob SquarePants are representations of the seven deadly sins, such as Patrick Star being compatible with sloth, and Mr. Krabs being compatible with greed.
- Mental disorder theory: A theory explaining that the main characters of SpongeBob SquarePants each have and represent a mental disorder, such as SpongeBob SquarePants having ADHD and Patrick Star having Down syndrome. The theory gained virality in early 2023 from a TikTok video explaining the theory. Tom Kenny, the voice actor for SpongeBob SquarePants, revealed at the 2024 Motor City Comic Con that he considers the character to be autistic.

Other theories about the characters include SpongeBob SquarePants having a god complex and Patrick Star having antisocial personality disorder.

=== Theories about Bikini Bottom ===
- Mutated Bikini Bottom theory: Bikini Bottom is a fictional city in SpongeBob SquarePants that is set below Bikini Atoll. A theory regarding Bikini Bottom explains that nuclear radiation from Operation Crossroads mutated the marine life of Bikini Bottom.
- Skin theory: Popularized by Doug Woolever's video essay in 2019, skin theory is defined by him as "The metatextual analysis of Spongebob Squarepants which recognizes and explores the significance of glaring thematic references to sea creatures who knowingly wear, remove, and exchange various forms of costumes, disguises, and skins in Bikini Bottom."

== In popular culture ==
- A 2011 Robot Chicken segment references the Krabby Patty crab meat theory, in which SpongeBob also exposes Krusty Krab food items that are made from various seafood.
- The Bikini Bottom radiation theory was the main topic for a 2021 video published by The Film Theorists.
- The Food Theorists, a sister channel of The Film Theorists, has made another video on the actual ingredients of the Krabby Patty.
