= Help Wanted (SpongeBob SquarePants) =

- SpongeBob SquarePants episode
- Title card
- Episode no.: Season 1 Episode 1a
- Directed by: Nick Jennings (art); Alan Smart (animation and supervising); Stephen Hillenburg (storyboard); Derek Drymon (storyboard artist)
- Written by: Stephen Hillenburg; Derek Drymon; Tim Hill
- Narrated by: Tom Kenny
- Production codes: Pilot (1997 version); 2515-127 (1999 recut)
- Original air dates: April 18, 1998 (screening in Austin, Texas): May 1, 1999
- Running time: 8 minutes, 18 seconds

Episode chronology
← Previous —	Next → "Reef Blower"
- SpongeBob SquarePants (season 1)

"Help Wanted" is the series premiere and pilot episode of the American animated television series SpongeBob SquarePants. It first aired on Nickelodeon in the United States on May 1, 1999, following the television broadcast of the 1999 Kids' Choice Awards. The episode follows the series' eponymous protagonist, SpongeBob, a yellow anthropomorphic sea sponge, attempting to get a job at a local fast food restaurant called the Krusty Krab.

Series creator Stephen Hillenburg initially conceived the show in 1994, and began to work on it shortly after the cancellation of Rocko's Modern Life in 1996. To voice the character of SpongeBob, Hillenburg approached Tom Kenny, who had worked with him on Rocko's Modern Life. For the series pitch, Hillenburg originally wanted the idea of having SpongeBob and Squidward on a road trip, inspired by the 1989 film Powwow Highway. Hillenburg gave up the idea and started anew with the story he and Derek Drymon came up with "Help Wanted", based on an experience Hillenburg had in the Boy Scouts. The original idea would be used for the later episode "Pizza Delivery".

The episode was written by Hillenburg (who also functioned as storyboard director), storyboard artist Derek Drymon (who also functioned as the credited storyboard artist), and Tim Hill. The animation was directed by the show's supervising director, Alan Smart. "Help Wanted" also re-popularized the Tiny Tim cover "Livin' in the Sunlight, Lovin' in the Moonlight".

"Help Wanted" was excluded from the DVD release of the series' first season because Nickelodeon was unwilling to pay Tiny Tim's estate for using "Livin' in the Sunlight, Lovin' in the Moonlight", although it had since been released on other various DVDs of the series. "Help Wanted" was viewed in over 2 million households, receiving positive reviews from critics.

== Plot ==
SpongeBob (top) as seen in the episode with the mechanical spatula he utilized to satisfy the anchovies' hunger

A French narrator introduces an aquatic city known as Bikini Bottom containing an ecstatic, hyperactive, optimistic, naïve, and friendly young yellow sea sponge, SpongeBob SquarePants. SpongeBob gets ready to apply for a job as the fry cook at the Krusty Krab, much to the annoyance of the restaurant's cashier and SpongeBob's grumpy neighbor, a turquoise giant Pacific octopus, Squidward Tentacles. SpongeBob initially reconsiders his decision on the perceived count that he is not good enough, until his best friend, a pink overweight sea star, Patrick Star, convinces him otherwise. Humored by SpongeBob's gullibility and enthusiasm, both Squidward and the restaurant's owner, a red ghost crab, Mr. Eugene Krabs, decide to manipulate SpongeBob by sending him on an impossible errand to purchase a seemingly rare, high-caliber mechanical spatula.

Soon after SpongeBob's departure, five buses containing ravenous anchovies stop at the Krusty Krab, all furiously demanding meals. Unable to satisfy the anchovies' hunger, Squidward and Mr. Krabs are left to deal with the unsatisfied crowd. The anchovies start piling up, forcing Squidward and Mr. Krabs to flee to the top of a support pole. Squidward and Mr. Krabs both believe they are hopeless and about to be killed by the large mob, until SpongeBob surprises the two by returning from his errand, having bought a spatula perfectly matching Mr. Krabs' specifications.

SpongeBob heads to the kitchen and uses the spatula to speedily cook Krabby Patties for all the anchovies. After the mob subsides, SpongeBob is officially welcomed as a Krusty Krab employee, much to Squidward's dismay. After Mr. Krabs leaves to count the day's profits, Patrick arrives and orders a Krabby Patty, and is hurled from the establishment upon a primarily unseen, and audibly manic, reprise of SpongeBob's cooking feat. The pilot ends with Squidward gleefully calling for Mr. Krabs to see the presumed mess SpongeBob has made.

== Voice cast ==
- Tom Kenny — SpongeBob, Narrator, Gary
- Bill Fagerbakke — Patrick Star
- Clancy Brown — Mr. Krabs
- Rodger Bumpass — Squidward, Anchovies

== Production ==
=== Development ===
An original storyboard panel for a scene from the episode when the show was going by the early name SpongeBoy Ahoy!

"Help Wanted" was written by series creator Stephen Hillenburg, Derek Drymon, and Tim Hill, and the animation was directed by the show's supervising director, Alan Smart. Hillenburg also functioned as storyboard director, and Drymon worked as storyboard artist. Hillenburg initially conceived the show in February 1996 during a campfire at a surfing trip in southern Baja California in a sketchbook. He initially pitched the show to Nickelodeon in July 1996, as production on Rocko's Modern Life was concluding. During this period, he was taking time off from the series to develop the concept into a show, initially exploring tiki/surf culture and nautical imagery as a backdrop. As the ideas simmered into his mind, Hillenburg set to work on a cartoon involving underwater invertebrates–using The Intertidal Zone comic as a basis–shortly after the cancellation of Rocko's Modern Life in November 1996.

Hillenburg's original idea for the pitch was that the writers would write a storyboard for a possible episode and pitch it to Nickelodeon. One of the original ideas was to write an episode with SpongeBob and Squidward on a road trip, inspired by the 1989 film Powwow Highway. The idea was later scrapped for the initial pitch, but the crew resurrected the road trip idea for a later episode in the season titled "Pizza Delivery" and used a lot of the ideas from it.

The storyboard for the pilot episode was finalized along with its episode name as "Help Wanted" on June 3, 1997. Originally, the character was to be named "SpongeBoy" and the show was to be called "SpongeBoy Ahoy!", but had to be changed following the discovery of Nickelodeon's legal department that the name "SpongeBoy" was already in use for a pencil product. This was discovered after voice acting for the original seven-minute pilot was recorded. In November 1997, upon finding this out, Hillenburg decided that the character's given name still had to contain "Sponge" so viewers would not mistake the character for a "Cheese Man". Hillenburg decided to use the name "SpongeBob SquarePants", with the character's surname "SquarePants" referring to his square shape. Hillenburg felt that it had a "nice ring to it".

"The execs from Nickelodeon flew out to Burbank, and we pitched it to them from the storyboards. We had squeezy toys, wore Hawaiian shirts, and used a boom box to play the Tiny Tim song ['Livin' in the Sunlight, Lovin' in the Moonlight'] that comes on in the third act. We really went all out in that pitch because we knew the pilot lived or died if the execs laughed. When it was over, they walked out of the room to discuss it; we figured they would fly back to New York, and we'd hear in a few weeks. We were surprised when they came back in what seemed like minutes and said they wanted to make it."
— Derek Drymon

Hillenburg and Drymon had dinner and came up with the idea for "Help Wanted" based on an experience Hillenburg had in the Boy Scouts. Hillenburg and Hill worked it into an outline. In the summer of 1997, while pitching the cartoon to Nickelodeon executives, Hillenburg donned a Hawaiian shirt, brought along an "underwater terrarium with models of the characters", and Hawaiian music to set the theme. The setup was described by Nickelodeon executive Eric Coleman as "pretty amazing". When given money and two weeks to write the pilot episode, Drymon, Hillenburg, and Jennings returned with what Nickelodeon official Albie Hecht described as "a performance [I] wish [I] had on tape". Although described as stressful by creative director Derek Drymon, the pitch went "very well"; Kevin Kay and Hecht had to step outside because they were "exhausted from laughing", making the cartoonists worried. With help from Hill and art director Nick Jennings, Hillenburg finished the pitch and sold SpongeBob SquarePants to Nickelodeon.

In an interview with Cyma Zarghami, she told "their [Nickelodeon executives'] immediate reaction was to see it again, both because they liked it, and it was unlike anything they'd ever seen before". Hillenburg said the character construction in the episode was loose, but held that character development was already "pretty strong".

=== Design ===
When the crew began production on the episode, they were tasked to design the stock locations where "the show would return to again and again, and in which most of the action would take place, such as the Krusty Krab and SpongeBob's pineapple house." Hillenburg had a "clear vision" of what he wanted the show to look like. The idea was "to keep everything nautical" so the crew used ropes, wooden planks, ships' wheels, netting, anchors and boilerplate, and rivets.

The pilot and the rest of the series feature the "sky flowers" as the main background. Series background designer Kenny Pittenger said that the sky flowers "function as clouds in a way, but since the show takes place underwater, they aren't really clouds." Since the show was influenced by various facets of Tiki culture, the background painters have to use a lot of patterns. Pittenger called the sky flowers a "whimsical design element that Steve [Hillenburg] came up with to evoke the look of a flower-print Hawaiian shirt—or something like that."

=== Casting ===
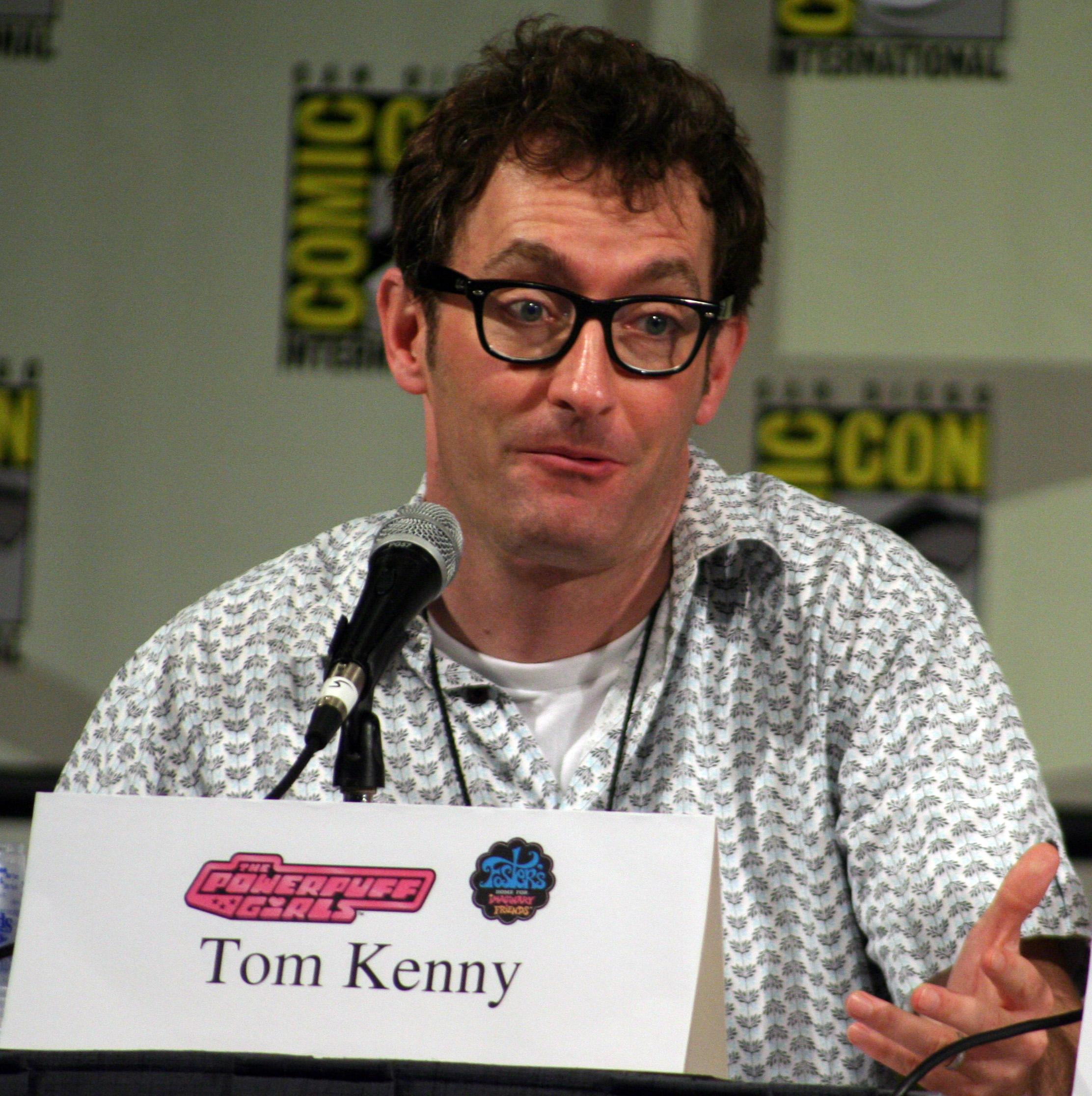
Tom Kenny voiced the character SpongeBob SquarePants.

While Drymon and Hill were writing the pilot, Hillenburg was also conducting auditions to find voices for the show's characters. He had created the character of SpongeBob with Tom Kenny, in which he utilized Kenny's and other people's personalities to help create its personality. Drymon said, "Tom came in a few times so we could pitch him what we were working to help him find the right voice. Tom had already worked on lots of other animated shows, and Steve wanted to find an original sounding voice." Kenny originally used the voice of SpongeBob for a very minor female alligator character named Al in Rocko's Modern Life who appeared in the episode "Dear John." Kenny forgot the voice initially, as he created it only for that single use. Hillenburg, however, remembered it when he was coming up with SpongeBob and used a video clip of the episode to remind Kenny of the voice. Kenny says that SpongeBob's high-pitched laugh was specifically aimed at being unique, stating that they wanted an annoying laugh in the tradition of Popeye and Woody Woodpecker.

Kenny also provided the voice of Gary, SpongeBob's meowing sea snail, and the narrator in the episode. According to him, "It was always Steve's intention that the narrator is a nod to his beloved Jacques Cousteau." Kenny described Cousteau's voice as "very dispassionate, very removed, very flatline, even when he's describing something miraculous and beautiful." At first, they found that the narrator "just sounds bored", so they decided that he "has to sound a little fun and playful". Kenny said, "'Let ees the most amazing thing I have ever seen in my life.' We found that after a while we had to make the narrator a little more playful than that."

Bill Fagerbakke voiced SpongeBob's best friend, a starfish named Patrick Star, in the episode. He auditioned for the role after Kenny had been cast as SpongeBob. Fagerbakke said, "Steve is such a lovely guy, and I had absolutely no feeling for the material whatsoever." He described his experience in the audition, saying, "I was just going in for another audition, and I had no idea what was in store there in terms of the remarkable visual wit and really the kind of endearing child-like humanity in the show. I couldn't pick that up from the audition material at all. I was just kind of perfunctorily trying to give the guy what he wanted." For the part of Squidward, Hillenburg originally had Mr. Lawrence in mind for the role. Lawrence worked with Hillenburg and Drymon before on Rocko's Modern Life, so while working on the episode, Hillenburg invited him to audition for all the characters. Drymon said, "We were showing Doug the storyboard, and he started reading back to us in his Tony the Tiger/Gregory Peck voice. It was really funny, and we wound up having SpongeBob use a deep voice when he entered the Krusty Krab for the first time." Hillenburg decided to give Lawrence the part of the series villain, Plankton, instead.

=== Music ===
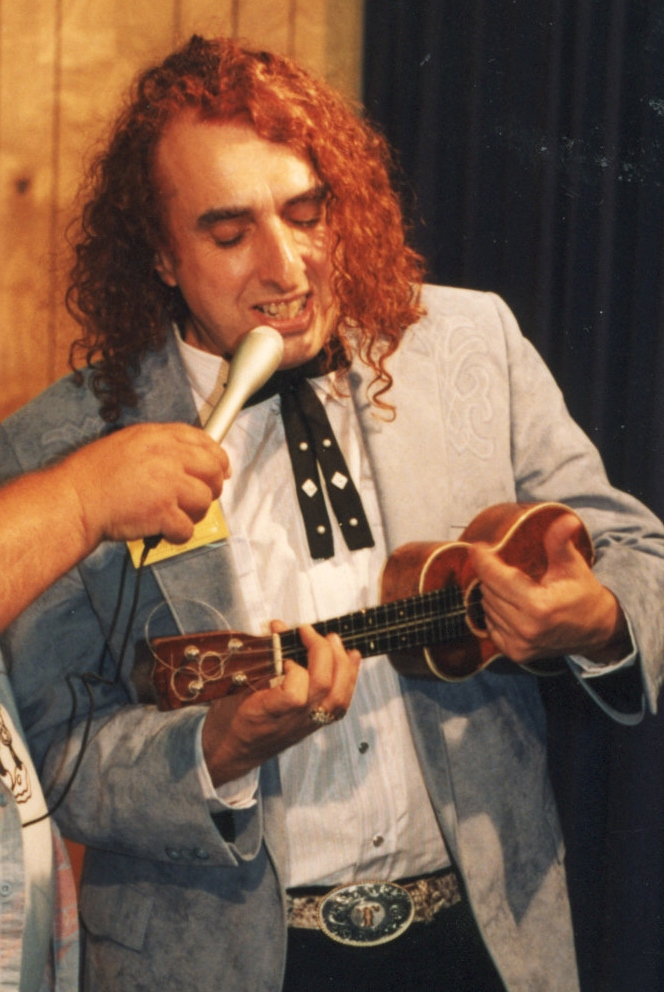
Tiny Tim's cover of "Livin' in the Sunlight, Lovin' in the Moonlight" features in the episode.

The episode features the song "Livin' in the Sunlight, Lovin' in the Moonlight" by Tiny Tim. At the point the pilot had already been completed, music editor Nick Carr was asked to retool the existing music on it. The production team allocated most of its music budget on using "Livin' in the Sunlight, Lovin' in the Moonlight", which Carr described as "a sadly familiar scenario with most cartoons for television. By the time it comes to consider the music, the budget is blown." Carr would go on to become one of the series' main composers.

The idea of using "Livin' in the Sunlight, Lovin' in the Moonlight" originated when someone sent Hillenburg a tape with "a bunch of music". While the writers were developing the show outside Nickelodeon, Hillenburg played the song for Drymon as an example of the enthusiasm he was looking for. When it came time to write the pilot, they had the idea to use the song in the third act. The crew eventually got the rights to use the song for the pilot, but all they had was "the crummy copy on Steve's old tape." Eventually, a Nickelodeon employee helped the crew get a master copy as she had a connection with someone who had access to the song. Drymon remarked, "The sad part was Tiny Tim died right around the time we were writing the pilot, so he never knew we used his song."

Jeff Hutchins was with Hillenburg in Rocko's Modern Life working on animation sound. Hutchins was approached by Hillenburg to do music for the show. He was asked for "20 things, like an ocean liner horn," and Hutchins knew he had the music Hillenburg was looking for. Hutchins said "I offered him options and, in some cases, multiple choices. We agreed to meet at the Warner Bros. gate near the water tower in 20 minutes." He recorded the sound to a Digital Audio Tape and showed it to Hillenburg upon their encounter. Hutchins described Hillenburg's mood as "happy as you could imagine, and off he went". Hutchins immediately became the regular series sound designer.

== Release ==
=== Broadcast ===
In April 1998, the original version of "Help Wanted" was showcased in Austin, Texas, alongside the series premiere of CatDog and Action League Now!, during a screening event for kids and families associated with the Big Stinkin' International Improv & Sketch Comedy Festival. SpongeBob SquarePants aired its first segment, "Help Wanted", along with sister segments "Reef Blower" and "Tea at the Treedome", on May 1, 1999, following the television airing of the 1999 Kids' Choice Awards. The series later made its official debut on July 17, 1999, with the second episode "Bubblestand" and "Ripped Pants".

=== Home media ===
"Help Wanted" was excluded from the SpongeBob SquarePants: The Complete First Season DVD, featuring the rest of the first-season episodes, since its release on October 28, 2003. It was not included because Nickelodeon did not want to pay Tiny Tim's estate for copyright clearance for the song featured in the episode. Subsequent DVD releases of the show include "Help Wanted", including the SpongeBob SquarePants: The Complete 3rd Season DVD as a bonus feature on September 27, 2005, the SpongeBob SquarePants: The First 100 Episodes DVD in 2009 which included all the episodes of seasons one through five, and the German release of the DVD of the first season. The First 100 Episodes DVD included a special feature called "Help Wanted" the Seven Seas Edition that featured "Help Wanted" in numerous languages. The episode "Help Wanted" was also a bonus feature in the series DVD called SpongeBob SquarePants: 10 Happiest Moments that was released on September 14, 2010. On April 29, 2014, "Help Wanted" was released on the "SpongeBob, You're Fired!" episode compilation DVD. Upon release, the DVD set was quickly sold out at Best Buy and was selling "briskly" at online retailers, including Amazon.com, Barnes & Noble, and Walmart.

In 2013, the series main cast members, including Tom Kenny, Clancy Brown, Rodger Bumpass, and Bill Fagerbakke, performed a live read-through of the episode during the SpongeBob event called "SpongeBob Fan Shellabration". The read-through took place on a sound effects stage at the Universal Studios Hollywood on September 7–8. The event also hosted the screening of the winning videos from the inaugural SpongeBob SquareShorts: Original Fan Tributes competition. The pilot was performed live once again in July 2024 as part of the show's 25th anniversary during San Diego Comic-Con.

== Reception and legacy ==
The SpongeBob pilot is one of the best pilots I've seen because it conveys a strong personality for the character and a strong sensibility for the show overall. It's interesting to remember that the show was not a huge hit immediately. It was just really good and interesting and went along in its own way for a while before people noticed it.

— Eric Coleman, Executive in Charge of Production for SpongeBob SquarePants.

Upon its release, "Help Wanted" was viewed in over 2 million households. Furthermore, the episode received generally favorable reviews from media critics. Michael Cavna of The Washington Post ranked "Help Wanted" at No. 3 at his The Top Five SpongeBob Episodes: We Pick 'Em list. Other episodes in the list are "Band Geeks", "Ripped Pants", "Just One Bite" and "Idiot Box". Cavna rewatched the episode in 2009 and said "so much of the style and polish are already in place". Nancy Basile of the About.com said "[The] humor and optimistic essence of SpongeBob is evident even in this first episode." Maxie Zeus of Toon Zone said the episode is a "winner". In an Associated Press article, Frazier Moore lauded the featured song in the episode called "Livin' in the Sunlight, Lovin' in the Moonlight" calling it the "kookie part".

Writer Kent Osborne considers the episode one of his favorite episodes and calls it "really good". Eric Coleman, vice president of animation development and production at Nickelodeon, lauded the episode and called it "one of the best pilots" because "it conveys a strong personality".

In a DVD review of the first season, Jason Bovberg of the DVD Talk was disappointed on the set, saying "Where is it? This is perhaps the only disappointment of the set. I was a little aggravated by the loooong animated menus that introduce all the characters, one by one, but it's really that missing episode that has me upset." Bovberg described the set as "annoying" for missing the episode. Bill Treadway of the DVD Verdict, on the exclusion of the episode on the DVD, said "It's a small flaw in an otherwise top-notch package." In a DVD review of the third season, Bryan Pope of the DVD Verdict, on the episode as a bonus feature, said: "The most intriguing extra is the series' pilot episode, 'Help Wanted'." He asked in his review "Why to release it now instead of in its natural spot with the first season?" Ultimately, he said, "Regardless, SpongeBob completists will cherish its inclusion here."
