= Krabby Patty =

Fictional hamburger

- Production company: United Plankton Pictures
- First appearance: "Help Wanted"; May 1, 1999
- Created by: Stephen Hillenburg
- Genre: Comedy

In-universe information
- Type: Veggie burger
- Function: Food product sold at the Krusty Krab
- Affiliation: Krusty Krab

The Krabby Patty is a fictional veggie burger sold by the fictional Krusty Krab restaurant in the animated television series SpongeBob SquarePants. Created by the restaurant's founder Eugene Krabs and his archenemy Plankton, it is what the main character SpongeBob cooks throughout his job as a fry cook, as well as the restaurant's trademark food and most famous burger in Bikini Bottom. A prominent storyline throughout the series is Krabs' nemesis Plankton trying to steal the Krabby Patty secret formula. This running gag was given a backstory in the special "Friend or Foe", where it is revealed that Krabs and Plankton created the Krabby Patty to compete with the health-violating restaurant Stinky Burgers.

== Role in SpongeBob SquarePants ==
Krabby Patties make their debut appearance in SpongeBob SquarePants' pilot episode "Help Wanted" and have had many different variations throughout the show's run.

The Krabby Patty burger is a menu item sold by the Krusty Krab as a fast food product. It is considered to be one of the most successful foods in Bikini Bottom. The Krabby Patty formula is a closely guarded trade secret, and rival restaurateur Plankton's futile attempts at acquiring the secret formula is a major recurring theme throughout the series. The Krusty Krab usually attracts customers from Bikini Bottom because of the Krabby Patty's renowned taste and the fact that Plankton's restaurant, the Chum Bucket, has a menu consisting of mostly inedible chum. Due to the lack of viable competition, Mr. Krabs is generally free to engage in price gouging, a practice he has been known to do throughout the show. Sometimes, the Krusty Krab is shown to have a drive-thru to serve Krabby Patties, as seen in the episodes "Driven to Tears" and "Drive Thru" as well as The SpongeBob Movie: Sponge Out of Water.

== Ingredients ==
The Krabby Patty is made with a frozen meatless burger. It is composed of the buns, the patty, pickles, lettuce, tomatoes, cheese, ketchup, mustard, and onions. It may also contain one or more secret ingredients according to a Krabby Patty secret formula, though said secret formula has never been revealed in the series.

The Krusty Krab's menu, the Galley Grub, consists mostly of ordinary fast-food items, such as french fries and sodas. Its signature burger, the Krabby Patty, is celebrated to a comical degree by the citizens of Bikini Bottom. In The SpongeBob Movie: Sponge Out of Water, Mr. Krabs states: "The Krabby Patty is what ties us all together! Without it, there will be a complete breakdown of social order!" In the Season 1 episode "Pickles" (S1E7), it's revealed that the standard Krabby Patty comprises a bottom bun, patty, lettuce, cheese, onion, tomato, ketchup, mustard, pickles, and top bun. Another variant, The Crying Johnny (a Krabby Patty with extra onions), is referenced as bottom bun, patty, ketchup, mustard, pickles, extra onions, lettuce, cheese, tomato, and top bun. (In that order.)

=== Theories ===
The formula has been hinted at but remained a mystery throughout the series. A running gag is Plankton's obsession with obtaining it as a way to produce the burgers and attract customers to his across-the-street restaurant, the Chum Bucket. The recipe of the patty is a closely guarded trade secret, which have led viewers to speculate about its contents. Several fan theories have been formed to guess the secret ingredient.

According to series animator Vincent Waller, "there is absolutely no meat in the Krabby Patty. There's no animal product in there", something which was always planned by series creator Stephen Hillenburg. Mr. Lawrence, a show writer and Plankton's voice actor, explained that the show's writers are not allowed to depict fish as food, or at least fish eating each other as food (as episodes such as "Hooky", "Wishing You Well", and "My Leg!" depict or allude to fish being consumed by humans); he stated that there is no meat served in Bikini Bottom except at the Chum Bucket. Tom Kenny, the voice actor for SpongeBob, joked: "Krabby Patties are hummus!" Some commentators suggest that there is actually no secret ingredient, pointing to Mr. Krabs' miserliness. A writer for Hollywood.com believes that it is "all a ruse that crafty Mr. Krabs came up with in order to stop Plankton from focusing on [t]he Chum Bucket. It's legitimately brilliant marketing!" The episode "Patty Caper" shows that there is truly a secret ingredient in the Krabby Patty, which is delivered to the restaurant with high security. When asked on the possibility that the secret formula will be revealed in future episodes, Waller said in 2017 that he "would not count on it". In 2019, Waller stated that Hillenburg, who died in 2018, is the only person to have seen it. On an episode of Binging with Babish, chef Andrew Rea theorized that the secret ingredient could be either nonexistent, or in the alternative that it was monosodium glutamate.

== Real-life inspirations ==
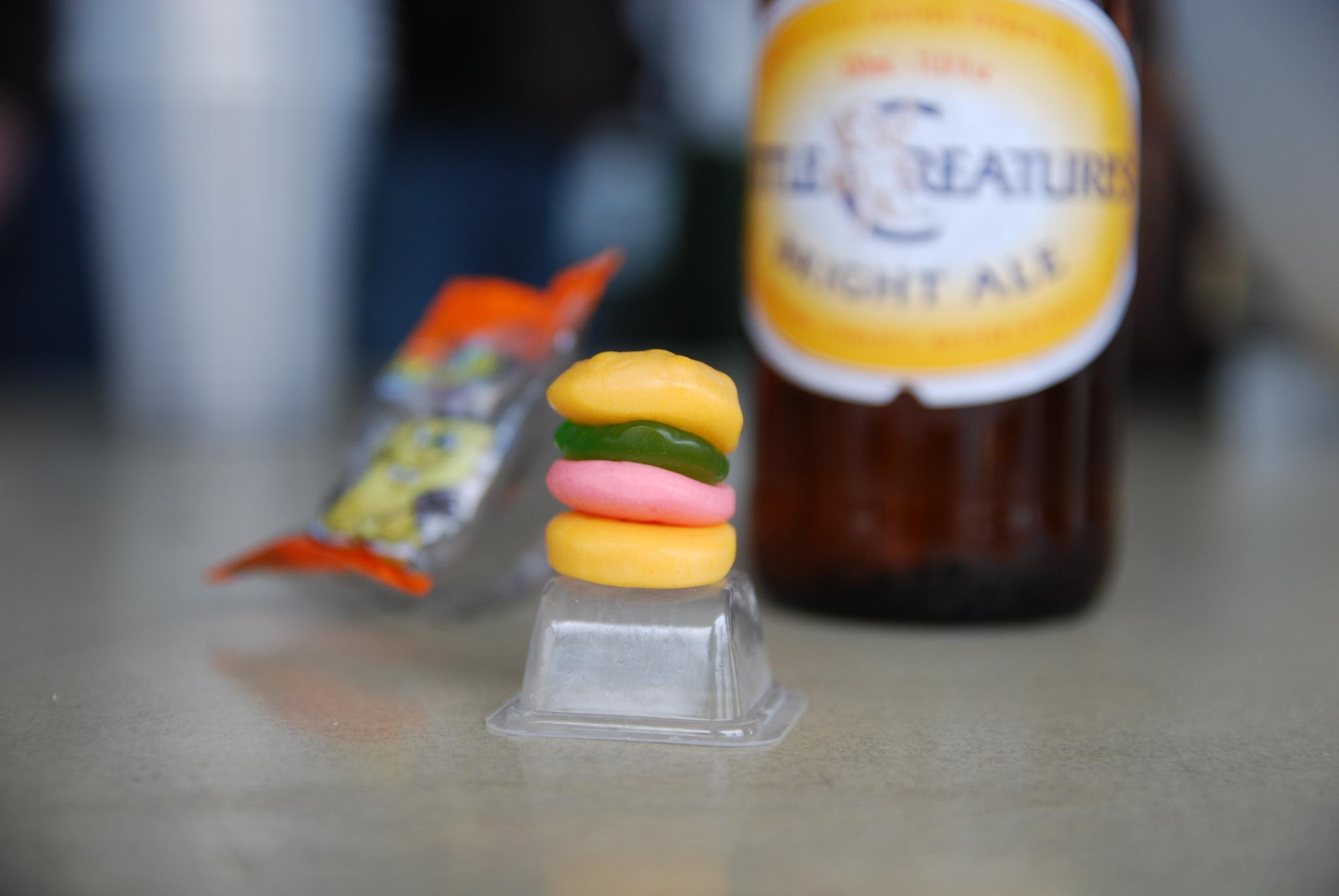
A gummy candy version of the Krabby Patty

Publications such as USA Today have named it among other fictional foods that many have wanted to exist in real life, but according to the New York Daily News, there are four restaurants which serve a similar burger to the one seen in the show. These burgers include the Snow Crab Crispy Rice, Phuket Fantasy, Angry Crab Benedict, and Soft Shell Crab Taco.

The Krabby Patties have also inspired real-life gummy confectionery treats, primarily in New England. In 2008, a doctor with Texas A&M Health Science Center College of Medicine warned parents to be aware of where the candy their child consumes is produced due to contamination then found in Chinese milk; SpongeBob Gummy Krabby Patties were among those candies produced in China. In 2019, a reporter with the student newspaper of Capital University gave the gummy candies a rating of a 2 out of 10 in their review of Halloween candy.

The Krabby Patty has been used by Katy Perry as a second costume on the red carpet at New York's Metropolitan Museum of Art. In The SpongeBob Musical, the Krabby Patty was portrayed by an actor on stage at the Palace Theatre. Various merchandise depicts SpongeBob and the Krabby Patty such as HipDot, as make-up, and as dog toys. American YouTuber, President Chay took inspiration from the Krabby Patty and made a real-life functioning vehicle resembling the look of the burger.

In celebration of SpongeBob's 25th anniversary, Wendy's offered a limited-time Krabby Patty burger as a special menu item—which included fries and a pineapple-vanilla swirled "pineapple under the sea" Frosty—as part of its "Krabby Patty Kollab" promotion from October 8 to November 11, 2024. The collaboration drew criticism from some of the show's fans because Hillenburg had conceived the canon Krabby Patty as a veggie burger, whereas the Wendy's version contains the chain's signature square beef-based patties, and personally opposed the use of his characters (and animated characters in general) to market fast food items to children, having stated that restaurants conducting marketing tie-ins with the show should not market food items as though they were actual Krusty Krab fare or have the characters appear in contact with the food.
