= President Chay =

American YouTuber (born 1998)

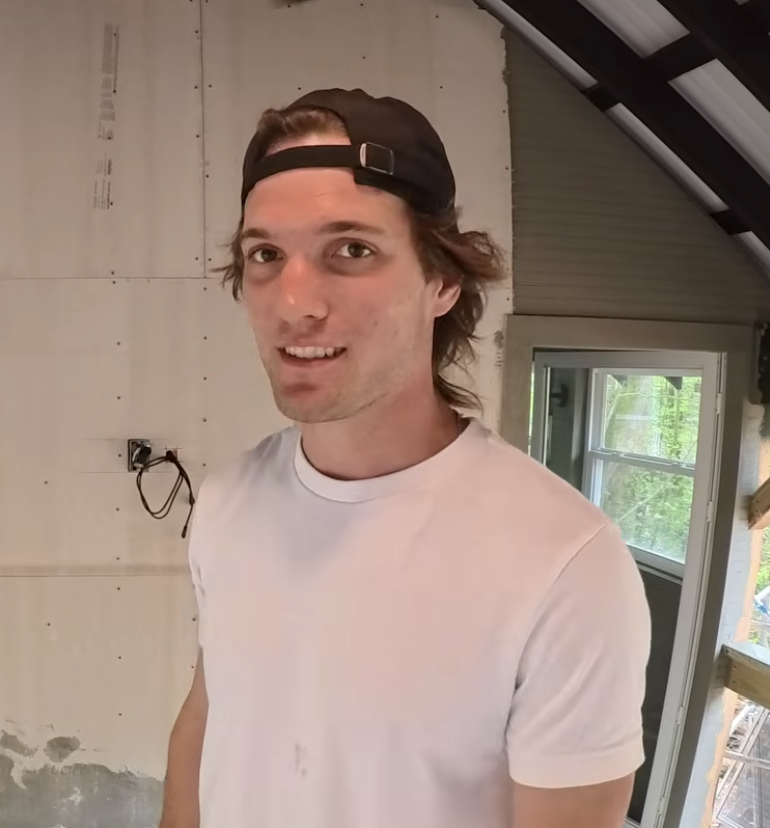
- Denne in 2026
- Born: Chay Denne; December 19, 1998 (age 27); Greenville, South Carolina, U.S.
- Occupation: YouTuber
- Partner: Kelsey Locke-Evans (married since 2024)

YouTube information
- Channel: President Chay
- Years active: 2020–present
- Genres: DIY; lifestyle; construction
- Subscribers: 2.51 million
- Views: 284 million
- Last updated: October 20, 2026

Chay Denne (born December 19, 1998), known professionally as President Chay, is an American YouTuber, vlogger, and internet personality from Greenville, South Carolina, he is best known for his DIY construction videos.

== Career ==
Denne was born and raised in Greenville, South Carolina. He launched his YouTube channel on May 22, 2020, and uploaded his first video on August 18, 2021. Denne's first form of content was creating extreme-challenge videos, which had him spend hours doing activities for fans. After gaining a massive following on YouTube, Denne's career surged in fame after he uploaded a video of himself converting a bus into a livable "home on wheels". Denne spent over half a year, and 57,000$ on building the bus.

Since then, Denne's been making videos revolving around homemade DIY projects, such as building pools, renovating other vehicles, such as RVs, Kei trucks, and custom living spaces using pickups, cargo beds and other usable items, as well as vlogging not just his personal life, but his building experiences too.

Denne's also built vehicles inspired by cartoons he enjoyed with his brother growing up, such as a functioning Krabby Patty vehicle, which he built in 2022.

== Personal life ==
Denne often makes videos with his father, Charlie, and his brother Colby. In some of his videos, Chay's mother, Shelli, sometimes makes guest appearances. In 2024, he became engaged with his long-time girlfriend. Later that year, he married Kelsey Evans and is currently based in Greer, South Carolina, where he resides in a modified bus that he built.
