= Squidward Tentacles =

SpongeBob SquarePants character

- SpongeBob SquarePants character
- First appearance: "Help Wanted"; SpongeBob SquarePants; May 1, 1999
- Created by: Stephen Hillenburg
- Designed by: Stephen Hillenburg
- Voiced by: Rodger Bumpass; Jason Maybaum (Young; Sponge on the Run)
- Portrayed by: Gavin Lee (SpongeBob SquarePants: The Broadway Musical)

In-universe information
- Full name: Squidward Quincy Tentacles
- Species: Giant pacific octopus (Note: Squidward was confirmed to be a giant pacific octopus in the episode "Feral Friends".)
- Gender: Male
- Occupation: Cashier at the Krusty Krab
- Relatives: Mrs. Tentacles (mother); Jeff Tentacles (father); Grandma Tentacles (grandmother)

Squidward Quincy Tentacles ( /ˈskwɪd.wərd/) is a fictional character in Nickelodeon's animated television series SpongeBob SquarePants. Created and designed by marine biologist and animator Stephen Hillenburg, he is voiced by actor Rodger Bumpass. Squidward first appeared on television in the series' pilot episode "Help Wanted" on May 1, 1999.

Despite having "squid" in his name, Squidward is an anthropomorphic octopus. He lives in a moai themed house between SpongeBob SquarePants' and Patrick Star's houses on Conch Street in Bikini Bottom. His character is portrayed as short-tempered, impatient, arrogant, selfish, sassy, introverted, and he despises his two neighbors' constant disruptive antics. However, the pair are unfazed by Squidward's dislike towards them and see him as a friend regardless. Squidward is an underappreciated artist, and has many hobbies such as painting and playing the clarinet. He works as the Krusty Krab cashier, alongside SpongeBob.

The character's reception from fans has been positive. Squidward is a recurring character in all of the franchise's theatrical and streaming films starting with The SpongeBob SquarePants Movie, and has appeared in many SpongeBob SquarePants publications, toys, and other merchandise.

== Development ==
=== Creation and design ===
Stephen Hillenburg first became fascinated with the ocean and began developing his artistic abilities as a child. During college, he majored in marine biology and minored in art. After graduating in 1984, he joined the Ocean Institute, an ocean education organization, where he had the idea to create a comic book titled The Intertidal Zone, which led to the creation of SpongeBob SquarePants. In 1987, Hillenburg left the institute to pursue a career in animation.

Early rough sketches of Squidward from creator Stephen Hillenburg's series bible

Several years after studying experimental animation at the California Institute of the Arts, Hillenburg met Joe Murray, creator of Rocko's Modern Life, at an animation festival. Murray offered Hillenburg a job as a director of the series. Martin Olson, one of the writers for Rocko's Modern Life, read The Intertidal Zone and encouraged Hillenburg to create a television series with a similar concept. At that point, Hillenburg had not considered creating his own series, but soon realized that this was his chance. Shortly after production on Rocko's Modern Life ended in 1996, Hillenburg began working on SpongeBob SquarePants.

Hillenburg used some character designs from his comic book. He designed "SpongeBob's grumpy next door neighbor" as an octopus because he liked the species' large head, noting that Squidward "thinks he's an intellectual". Instead of the usual eight limbs, Hillenburg explained that Squidward is normally drawn with six limbs as it was "just simpler" to animate him that way. Squidward is only shown with a full set of eight tentacles in two episodes: the live-action sequence in "Pressure" from season two, and briefly in "Sold!" from season nine. Hillenburg named the character Squidward after the squid, which is closely related to the octopus and has ten limbs, and the English name, Edward. In the words of Squidward's voice actor Rodger Bumpass, the name Octoward "just didn't work".

Of Squidward's design, show writer and storyboard artist Vincent Waller said in 2010:

Squidward is hard to draw—he has a very odd-shaped head. Fortunately, his emotions are pretty even, but to get a whole lot of big emoting out of him is a challenge. His nose splits everything in half, so it's always like, 'OK, how am I going to work this and still make it read?'

Hillenburg thought of making jokes with Squidward ejecting ink but retired it because, according to him, "it always looks like he's pooping his pants". Despite this, inking jokes would appear in episodes like "Giant Squidward" and "Ink Lemonade". The sound of Squidward's footsteps, which evokes that of suction cups pulling on the ground, is produced by rubbing hot water bottles. The footsteps, and those of the rest of the main characters, are recorded by the show's foley crew, supervised by the show's sound designer Jeff Hutchins. Bumpass inspired the idea of having Squidward ride a recumbent bicycle; Bumpass owns one of these bicycles, which he rides around Burbank, California. Bumpass described it as his "little inside joke".

=== Voice ===
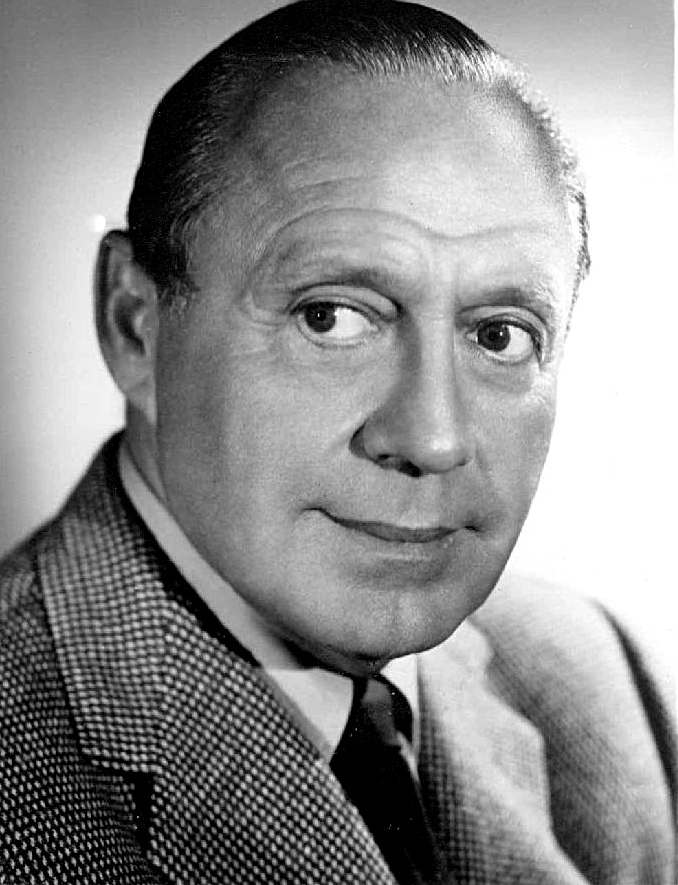
Squidward's voice has been compared to that of American comic actor Jack Benny.

Squidward's voice is provided by actor Rodger Bumpass, who voices several other SpongeBob SquarePants characters, including Squidward's mother. While creating the show and writing its pilot episode in 1997, Hillenburg and the show's then-creative director Derek Drymon were also conducting voice auditions. Mr. Lawrence, who had worked with Hillenburg and Drymon on Rocko's Modern Life, was Hillenburg's first choice for the role. Hillenburg had invited Lawrence to audition for all the show's characters. Instead of Squidward, Hillenburg decided to give Lawrence the part of Plankton, the series' villain.

According to Bumpass, Squidward was "a very nasally, monotone kind of guy". He said the character became interesting to perform because of "his sarcasm, and then his frustration, and then his apoplexy, and so he became a wide spectrum of emotions". Tom Kenny, the voice of SpongeBob, describes Bumpass recording his lines in the studio, saying, "I love watching Rodger ... He's right next to me". According to Kenny, when Bumpass "goes apoplectic" as Squidward while recording, his head turns red, "and you're afraid he's going to have an embolism".

Several of the show's crew praise Bumpass for his performance and similitude to the character. Kenny called Bumpass "brilliant" and said, "[he] is sort of like Squidward". Staff writer Kent Osborne said, "I remember thinking about how much Rodger talks and acts like Squidward. That's why it's such a good voice—he's so connected to it". However, Bumpass said, "I'm not him and he's not me, but what I'm required to do for him and what I am enabled to do for him is what makes it like me. It fits my particular talents and skills very well. So in that respect, yeah, he is me, but I am not the cranky, sarcastic, underachieving kind of guy that he is. He's easy to fall in, I will say that."

Squidward's voice has been compared to that of Jack Benny. Kenny said, "To me, there's something just so funny about that Jack-Benny-loyal-to-nobody character that Rodger Bumpass does such a great job of playing [...] Squidward". Arthur Brown, author of Everything I Need to Know, I Learned from Cartoons!, said that Squidward "sounds a lot like Jack Benny". Bumpass repudiated the relationship, saying "Jack Benny, no. Although he does have this observational sarcasm he occasionally brought out."

== Appearances ==
=== Role in SpongeBob SquarePants ===
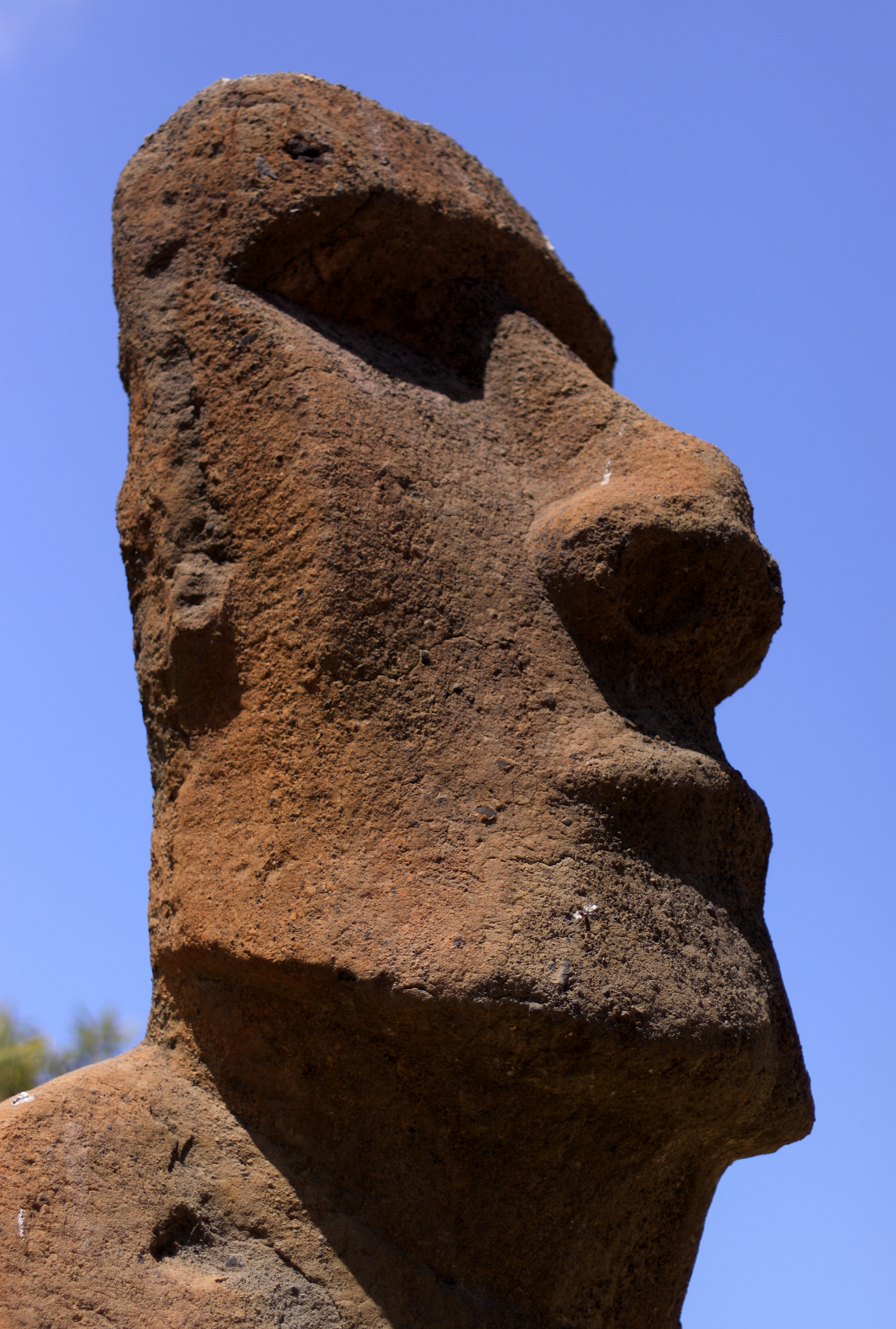
Squidward lives in a moai, like those of Easter Island.

Squidward is depicted as a grumpy and bitter turquoise octopus. He lives in the underwater city of Bikini Bottom in a moai situated between SpongeBob SquarePants' pineapple house and Patrick Star's rock. Squidward is annoyed by his neighbors for their perpetual laughter and boisterous behavior, though SpongeBob and Patrick are oblivious to being a nuisance to Squidward.

Squidward lives in a constant state of self-pity and misery; he is unhappy with his humdrum lifestyle and yearns for celebrity status, wealth, hair, and a glamorous and distinguished career as a musician or painter with a passion for art and playing the clarinet, although he has no actual talent for either. However, he is left to endure the lowly status as a fast-food cashier at the Krusty Krab restaurant. Squidward resents his job and is irritated by his greedy employer Mr. Krabs and by having his own resented neighbor SpongeBob as a colleague.

=== Other media ===
Alongside the television series, Squidward appears in the February 2011 issues of SpongeBob Comics. He also appears in various SpongeBob SquarePants video games, and in various theme parks and theme park parades including Sea World and Universal's Superstar Parade. He also appears in Nickelodeon All-Star Brawl 2 (2023). In 2004, Squidward appeared in the first feature-length film adaptation of the show, The SpongeBob SquarePants Movie, which was released on November 19, 2004, and was financially successful, grossing over US$140 million worldwide. He also appears in the film's sequels, The SpongeBob Movie: Sponge Out of Water which was released in theaters on February 6, 2015, and The SpongeBob Movie: Sponge on the Run which was released in the United States on Paramount+ streaming service on March 4, 2021, and in other territories on Netflix earlier on November 5, 2020. In 2019, he made a cameo appearance in the Super Bowl LIII halftime show during an animation that introduced rapper Travis Scott. Squidward has also been included in various SpongeBob SquarePants-related merchandise, including board games, phone case, sneakers and vans, books, plush toys, and trading cards. (Note: Sources that cite merchandise about Squidward include:)

The episode "The Sponge Who Could Fly" was adapted in 2009 as a stage musical at the Liverpool Empire Theatre, and later in South Africa. Actor Charles Brunton originated the role of Squidward, later recalling that he loved the character, and the "fun [of] trying to re-create a well established cartoon character into a live performance on stage." Brunton prepared for the role by buying nine DVDs of the series, acting out Squidward's part in each episode, in his bedroom. He said, "it took ages to perfect the voice and the way he used his arms". Brunton's performance and the musical were well received by most critics. A critic from The Public Reviews wrote, "Charles Brunton as Squidward really stole the show for us, his character was nailed to perfection, from his comic acting, voice and mannerisms this was a faultless performance". In his review for The Northern Echo, Viv Hardwick said, "Charles Brunton makes a convincing Squidward". The role was played by Chris van Rensburg in South Africa.

=== 2016 stage musical ===
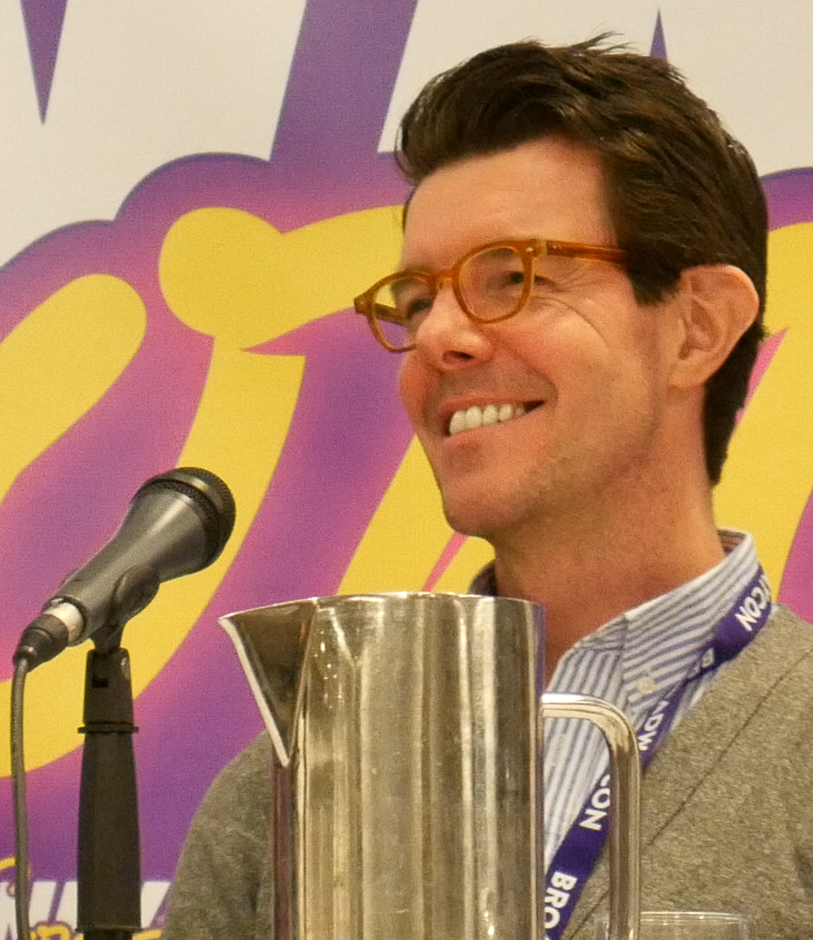
Actor Gavin Lee originated the role of Squidward in the musical.

A stage musical based on the show premiered in June 2016 at the Oriental Theatre in Chicago. Squidward is portrayed using two extra legs to replicate Squidward's four-legged design. Characterization-wise, Squidward is still portrayed as grumpy like in the series while being humanized as much as possible. Notable additions to Squidward's character include him having a dead mother, whom he talks to several times during the musical.

In the musical, Bikini Bottom is threatened by a volcano that will erupt in two days, so the townspeople decide to hold a concert to raise money so they can evacuate. While he wants to perform on the concert himself, Squidward is instead assigned to manage the event while rock band the Electric Skates is asked to play. When the band arrives, Squidward wants to be their opening act, but he is rejected because he fails to get one of the items that the Electric Skates requests. The band calls Squidward a loser, causing him to snap, and he drives the band away. Squidward then insists that he is not a loser and performs a tap-dance number backed by a chorus line until he realizes it is just his imagination ("I'm Not a Loser"). Because the concert and the evacuation plan fail, the town falls into chaos until SpongeBob, Patrick, and Sandy arrive and tell them that they have used a device that should stop the eruption. After the volcano does not erupt at the supposed time, Squidward is allowed to perform in a concert to celebrate the town's survival.

==== Original portrayal ====
Actor Gavin Lee originated the role of Squidward in the Chicago run and reprised the role in the musical's Broadway run and its 2019 television adaptation. As Lee was not familiar with the show prior to his audition, Lee binge-watched eight SpongeBob episodes and listened to Rodger Bumpass' voice. Director Tina Landau encouraged the actors to not be a "carbon copy" of the cartoon characters and make something different, allowing Lee to not exactly replicate Bumpass' voice, especially during emotional parts.

Lee liked how Squidward is the one grumpy character in an upbeat musical. Three times in the musical, Squidward is stopped from singing, so that when his number "I'm Not a Loser" is finally sung in Act 2, "the audience is just gagging for Squidward to finally express himself", as Gavin Lee described. "I'm Not a Loser" features Squidward tap-dancing backed by a chorus line of sea anemones.

To play the four-legged Squidward, Lee wore two extra fake legs. Lee said that he wanted the fake legs to be secure and asymmetrical to his real legs, which made the legs uncomfortable to wear, but he likes them as a gimmick and how the audience reacted positively to them. Since Squidward tap-danced with four legs in "I'm Not a Loser", Lee and choreographer Chris Gattelli worked together to figure out how Lee would tap-dance with two extra tap shoes, as neither had tap-danced like that before. Lee said that in order to make four tap noises, he tap-danced in a more "sloppy" way: "Having loose ankles, but also having the tension there to make the noises with the extra [taps]." Squidward's four-legged tap dance has been compared to Lee's previous role as Bert in the Mary Poppins musical where he tap-danced upside-down.

Lee's performance as Squidward and his tap dance number "I'm Not a Loser" are considered a highlight of the show. In his review of the Chicago run, Steven Oxman of Variety called Squidward the "unquestionable highlight" and described "I'm Not a Loser" as "a dose of true Broadway pizzazz, and expresses the character's inner self with sensitivity and flair." Reviewing the Broadway run, Alexis Soloski of The Guardian called Lee's tap number "rapturous", while Peter Marks on The Washington Post considers it "a particular joy". Vice's Jo Rosenthal considered Lee's performance of "I'm Not a Loser" as "heart-rending" and "earned his standing ovation". In addition to calling "I'm Not a Loser" the musical's highlight, David Rooney of The Hollywood Reporter praised Squidward's four-legs costume as well. In 2018, for his performance in the Broadway run, Gavin Lee won a Drama Desk Award for Outstanding Featured Actor in a Musical and was nominated for a Tony Award for Best Featured Actor in a Musical.

==== Subsequent portrayals ====
In the 2019–20 North American tour of the musical, Squidward was played by Cody Cooley. Although he was skeptical about the idea of a SpongeBob musical at first, Cooley was impressed when he watched the Broadway run. When Cooley watched the Broadway run with his friends, they commented that Cooley would be a good fit for Squidward because Cooley was considered grouchy. Cooley himself said that he related to Squidward's pessimism and sarcastic personality. Cooley had applied twice for the role before being called to audition and cast in the role. After being cast, Cooley rewatched the first three seasons of SpongeBob to study Squidward's character.

Cooley said that Squidward's tap number was his favorite part of the show. Prior to getting the role, Cooley already had tap-dancing experience. During the rehearsal in New York City, Cooley learned how to tap with two extra tap shoes and practiced it around twice a day to build up stamina. Cooley considered stamina important for the tap number because the extra legs weigh 25 pounds, he must dance for at least seven minutes and the number ends with a kickline. He also learned how to play clarinet for the part where Squidward plays it at the end of the show.

In the 2023 United Kingdom tour, Squidward was played by Gareth Gates and Tom Read Wilson, depending on the venue. Gates described Squidward as a very different person compared to him due to Squidward's grumpiness, which was his stated reason for liking the role. Gates had not tap-danced prior to getting this role, so he had to learn to tap dance by taking three lessons before the rehearsals.

== Reception ==
The character of Squidward has received a positive reception from critics and fans alike. SpongeBob's voice actor Tom Kenny named Squidward his favorite character on the show: "He has an extra dimension where SpongeBob and Patrick's capacity of play mystifies him, but he's also jealous of it. When he tries to participate, he just fails utterly because he doesn't believe in it." Staff writer Casey Alexander said, "Squidward is the character I relate to the most. In an exaggerated way, he's the most human character. If I knew a human like SpongeBob, I probably would react to him like Squidward does". American singer Pharrell Williams, who is a fan of the show, stated that "Squidward is my favorite, though. If he was a human, I would hang out with him." Mahejabeen Hossain Nidhi of The Daily Star stated that "we are all secretly Squidward" due to his personality in the movie.

Bill Treadway of DVD Verdict said that Squidward is "a cross between Bert [of Sesame Street], Woody Allen, and Roger Addison [of Mr. Ed] ... but he has some heart, if you can find it". Treadway called him "the straight man for his neighbor's antics". Film critic A. O. Scott of The New York Times said, in his review of The SpongeBob SquarePants Movie, that Squidward is one of his favorite secondary characters on the show, along with Sandy Cheeks and Mrs. Puff. He wrote, "I was sorry to see [them] pushed to the margins". Also from the same publication, television critic Joyce Millman said that Squidward has "the nasal bitchiness of Paul Lynde and the artistic pretensions of Felix Unger." Millman further wrote, "Hmmm, Squidward is one gay squid, I think."

"Band Geeks", an episode of the series' second season that focuses on Squidward, is often considered by many critics and fans alike as the show's best episode. Writing for The Washington Post, Michael Cavna ranked "Band Geeks" as the fifth best episode of SpongeBob SquarePants. In his review, Cavna said, "Squidward's mix of artistic aspiration in the face of goading, humiliation and unrelenting sub-mediocrity made this a kids' episode that adults can experience on a whole 'nother level." On a less positive note, Squidward was listed among Common Sense Media's "10 Worst TV Role Models of 2012"; author Sierra Filucci wrote that Squidward's selfishness is his "worst offense", calling him "the mean and nasty cashier at the Krusty Krab [who] is nice only when he wants something."

At the 39th Daytime Emmy Awards in 2012, Bumpass was nominated for his vocal performance as Squidward in the Outstanding Performer in the Animated Program category—the first cast member to be nominated in this category. The award was won by June Foray of The Garfield Show. Bumpass has said he was proud of the certificate he received for the nomination, but "there wasn't really a competition because one of the other nominees was June Foray and she is royalty in the animation world ... There was no way any of the other three guys had a chance. In fact, if any of us had won, there would have been a riot in that studio [The Beverly Hilton]." He said he was "happy to lose to June Foray" and "very pleased and grateful to get a nomination".
