= Krusty Krab =

Fictional restaurant in SpongeBob SquarePants

The Krusty Krab
- SpongeBob SquarePants organization
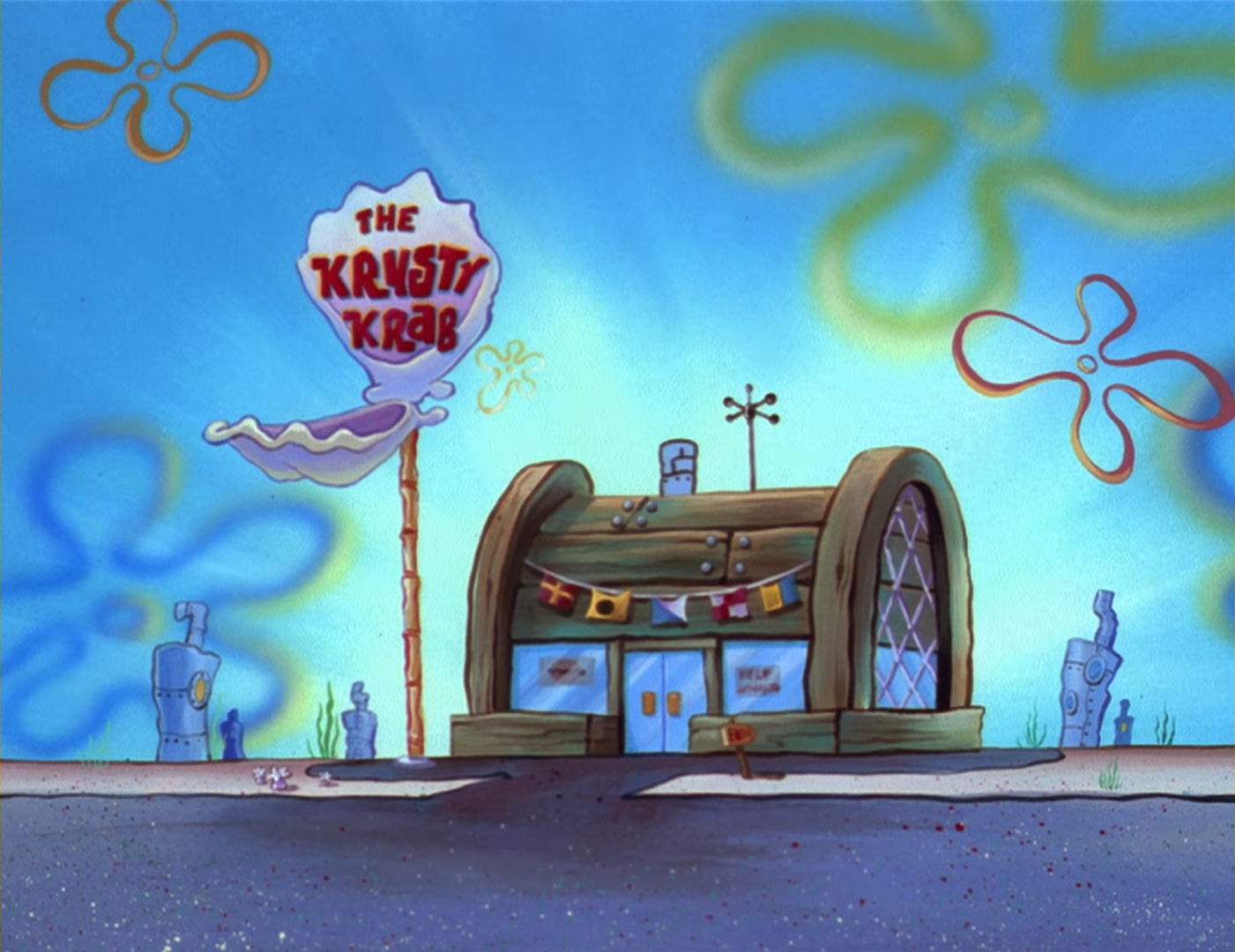
- The outside of the Krusty Krab
- First appearance: "Help Wanted" (1999)
- Created by: Stephen Hillenburg

In-universe information
- Type: Fast food restaurant
- Location: Bikini Bottom
- Owner: Eugene Krabs
- Employees: Eugene Krabs (manager); SpongeBob SquarePants (fry cook); Squidward Tentacles (cashier)
- Products: Krabby Patties
- Slogan: "Come Spend Your Money Here!"

The Krusty Krab is a fictional fast food restaurant in the American animated television series SpongeBob SquarePants. In the television show the restaurant is famous for its signature burger, the Krabby Patty, the formula to which is a closely guarded trade secret.

The restaurant was founded by Eugene H. Krabs (often referred to as Mr. Krabs), who is also the owner and manager. According to The SpongeBob Musical, Mr. Krabs' daughter Pearl will inherit the Krusty Krab when she grows older. SpongeBob SquarePants (who works as the fry cook) and Squidward Tentacles (the cashier) are the only full-time employees. Deemed "the finest eating establishment ever established for eating" in Bikini Bottom, it is constantly challenged by its primary competitor, the Chum Bucket, which is operated by Sheldon J. Plankton, a plankton, and his wife Karen, a waterproof supercomputer.

One of the main settings of the series, the Krusty Krab was introduced in the pilot episode, "Help Wanted", where SpongeBob applies for the fry cook job at the restaurant. The Krusty Krab has also been featured in other media, including a theatrical film series, a Broadway musical, video games, and toys. It has been referenced or parodied throughout popular culture and has also inspired real-life establishments.

== Role in SpongeBob SquarePants ==
Inside the restaurant, Squidward is working as the cashier, and various characters are eating Krabby Patties, depicted here in the episode "Krusty Krab Training Video".

The Krusty Krab is a prominent fast-food restaurant in the underwater city of Bikini Bottom. It is owned and operated by Eugene H. Krabs (Mr. Krabs), who invented its famous Krabby Patty sandwich and plans to transfer ownership of the restaurant to his daughter, Pearl, when she is older. Squidward Tentacles and SpongeBob SquarePants work at the Krusty Krab as the cashier and fry cook, respectively. The other main characters of the series have also held temporary, single-episode positions at the Krusty Krab.

Located across the street from the Krusty Krab is the unsuccessful Chum Bucket, owned and operated by Plankton and Karen. Plankton, Mr. Krabs' former best friend, later became his arch-competitor; Plankton's futile attempts at stealing the secret Krabby Patty recipe to replicate the burgers and put the Krusty Krab out of business, which are often thwarted by SpongeBob and/or Mr. Krabs, are a major plot point throughout the series. Mr. Krabs frequently exploits his restaurant's popularity, such as engaging in price gouging and charging his own employees for use of the building's services.

In the season 3 episode "Krusty Krab Training Video", the Krusty Krab building is shown to have originally been a run-down retirement home called the Rusty Krab, which Mr. Krabs acquired and converted into a restaurant, adding a "K" to the word "Rusty". In another episode, the Krusty Krab was the name of a pirate ship owned by Mr. Krabs before he started the business, which he named after the ship. The restaurant has seen a lot of temporary changes throughout the show, such as switching to a 24/7 schedule and being transformed into a hotel. Other episodes have depicted the Krusty Krab being damaged or destroyed, although due to the show having loose continuity the restaurant inexplicably always appears rebuilt and in good shape the following episode.

=== Krabby Patty ===
The Krusty Krab's menu, the Galley Grub, consists mostly of ordinary fast-food items, such as fries and sodas. Its signature sandwich, the Krabby Patty, is comically beloved by the citizens of Bikini Bottom. In The SpongeBob Movie: Sponge Out of Water, Mr. Krabs states: "The Krabby Patty is what ties us all together! Without it, there will be a complete breakdown of social order!" The sandwich comprises two buns, with the patty, lettuce, cheese, onions, tomatoes, ketchup, mustard, and pickles between them (in that order). The recipe of the patty is a closely guarded trade secret, which have led viewers to speculate about its contents. Several fan theories have been formed to guess the secret ingredient.

According to animator Vincent Waller, "there is absolutely no meat in the Krabby Patty. There's no animal product in there", something which was always planned by series creator Stephen Hillenburg. Mr. Lawrence, a show writer and Plankton's voice actor, explained that the show's writers are not allowed to depict fish as food; he stated that there is no meat served in Bikini Bottom except at the Chum Bucket. Some commentators suggest that there is actually no secret ingredient. A writer for Hollywood.com believes that it is "all a ruse that crafty Mr. Krabs came up with in order to stop Plankton from focusing on the Chum Bucket. It's legitimately brilliant marketing!" On the possibility that the secret Krabby Patty formula will be revealed in future episodes, Waller said in 2017 that he "would not count on it". In 2019, Waller stated that Hillenburg, who died in 2018, is the only person to have seen it.

== Development ==
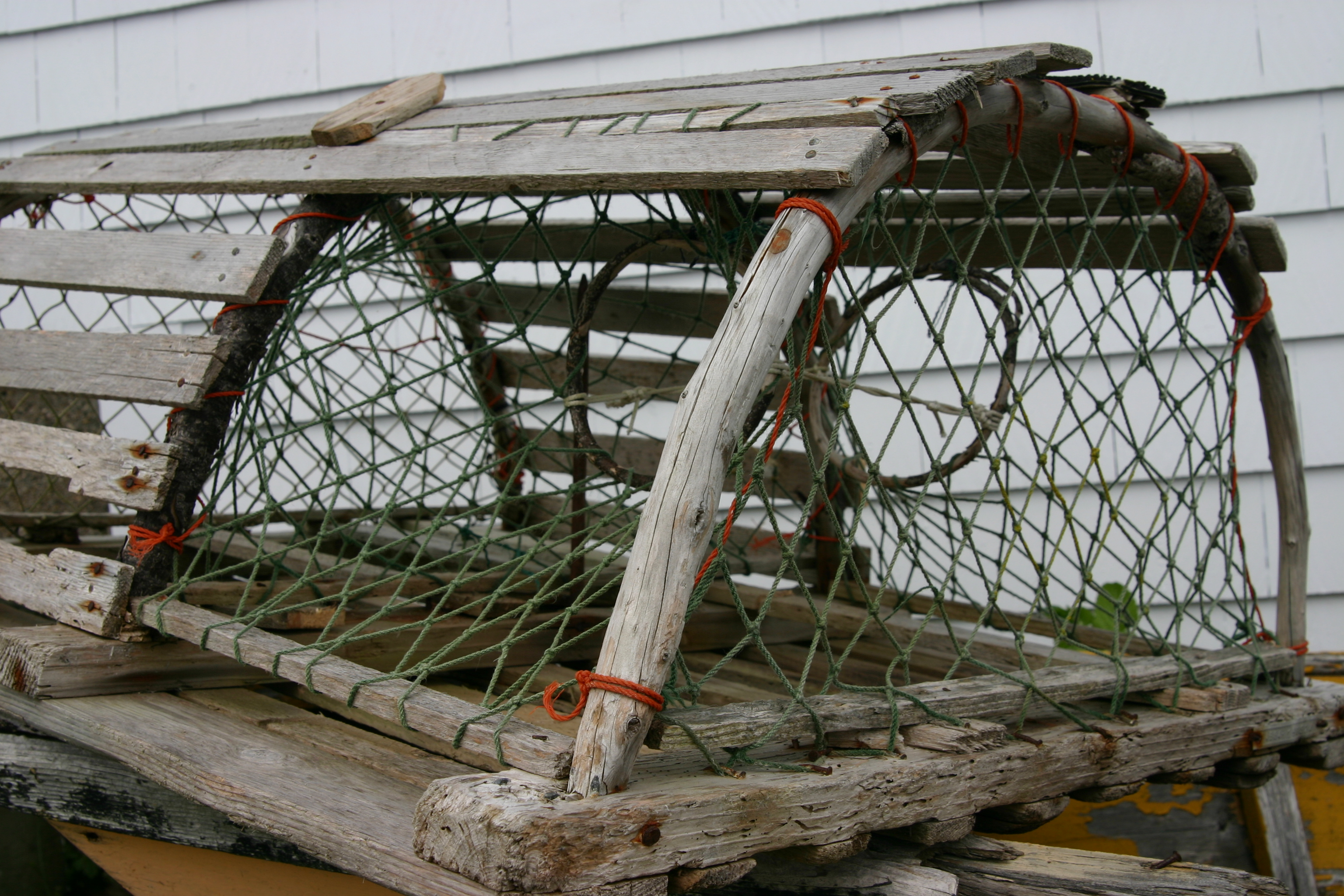
The Krusty Krab's design is based on a lobster trap.

Along with SpongeBob's pineapple house, the Krusty Krab was originally intended to be where "the show would return to again and again, and in which most of the action would take place". It debuted in "Help Wanted", the series premiere, and has since appeared in more than 80% of episodes as of 2018.

The Krusty Krab was inspired by series creator Stephen Hillenburg's time as a fry cook and lobster boiler at a fast-food seafood restaurant during several summers after finishing high school. SpongeBob's job was directly based on this experience, while Mr. Krabs was inspired by Hillenburg's manager at the restaurant. Hillenburg added the "greedy" part of Mr. Krabs' character to "give him more personality".

When Hillenburg first created Mr. Krabs, his surname was spelled Crabs, and the name of the restaurant was the Crusty Crab. Hillenburg changed the spelling shortly before production began on the show's pilot episode, deciding that K's were funnier and more memorable. He based the building's design on a lobster trap.

== Appearances in other media ==
The restaurant was featured in the 2004 theatrical film The SpongeBob SquarePants Movie and its 2015 follow-up, with the secret Krabby Patty formula acting as a major plot device in both films. The Krusty Krab and the Krabby Patty have been referenced or parodied throughout popular culture. In "Major League of Extraordinary Gentlemen", an episode of the sketch comedy Robot Chicken, a segment features Mr. Krabs using crab legs as the secret ingredient for Krabby Patties. Online, the Krusty Krab–Chum Bucket rivalry has been turned into memes.

The Krusty Krab has been included in many SpongeBob SquarePants toys, publications, and other merchandise. The Lego Group has released two Lego construction sets modeled after the Krusty Krab building. The Krusty Krab has also appeared in SpongeBob-related video games, such as SpongeBob SquarePants: Creature from the Krusty Krab, the title of which alludes to the restaurant. Viacom, which owns Nickelodeon, has earned millions of dollars on licensed products bearing the Krusty Krab name, mainly aquarium figurines and children's play sets.

== Cultural impact ==
=== Reception ===
The Krusty Krab has been recognized by numerous publications—including BuzzFeed, the New York Daily News, Screen Rant, and food website The Daily Meal—as a restaurant they wished were real. Similarly, as stated in Boston.com, "Sure, we can get crab cakes, but we wish we could try the Krusty Krab's signature sandwich, the Krabby Patties. If only we could get a suit like Sandy's and journey to Bikini Bottom". In another list published by The Daily Meal, the Krusty Krab was voted number one of "all the fictional spots currently on TV that our readers wished they could dine at". In 2016, Time magazine listed the Krusty Krab as one of the 18 most influential fictional companies.

=== Real-life versions ===
==== Imitations ====
External images
- View of the exterior of Salta Burgers' real-life Krusty Krab replica in Ramallah
- Scene inside the building with tables, chairs, cash register booth, and other detailing similar to those of the television series.

The Krusty Krab has inspired several real-life establishments unaffiliated with Nickelodeon or its parent company, Viacom. In Santa Elena, Costa Rica, a restaurant called the Krusty Krab opened in 2012 but closed a year later. In Ramallah in the West Bank, a company called Salta Burgers constructed a real-life Krusty Krab, which received online attention. It opened on July 24, 2014, serving seafood and its own version of the Krabby Patty; the restaurant was in operation as of 2017, but was shut down by 2019. Some commentators, like in the Houston Press noted of these foreign imitations that "The long arm of U.S. trademark law doesn't reach across international waters. Every country has its own filing process that must be followed". In Moscow, a Krusty Krab-themed restaurant called The Krusty Krab Cafe opened in 2016 and also makes unofficial Krabby Patties. In Davao City, Philippines, a coffee shop opened in 2017 and sells Krabby Patty-inspired sandwiches; it was named KrustyKrub Cafe because the son of its husband-and-wife owners is a fan of the show.

In January 2016, Viacom sued IJR Capital Investments after learning that it had applied to trademark the Krusty Krab name at the U.S. Patent and Trademark Office (USPTO) in December 2014. The latter was planning to open two restaurants adopting the moniker in Houston and Los Angeles. In the lawsuit, Viacom claimed that the proposed restaurants would be an infringement, even though Viacom had not filed a formal trademark for the Krusty Krab name. IJR owner, Javier Ramos Jr. claimed he thought of the name, referring to "the crust that sticks to the top of crabs when they are put in a seafood boil". He claimed not to have heard of the Krusty Krab in SpongeBob SquarePants, and that he chose it after checking Google and finding no restaurants using that name. While the USPTO approved IJR's trademark application, a Texas federal judge ruled in January 2017 that IJR violated Viacom's rights to the SpongeBob property, citing "ownership of a trademark is established by use, not by registration". The U.S. Court of Appeals for the Fifth Circuit decided in May 2018 that Viacom deserves trademark protection for the Krusty Krab, and that IJR cannot use it.

==== San Diego Comic-Con 2019 ====
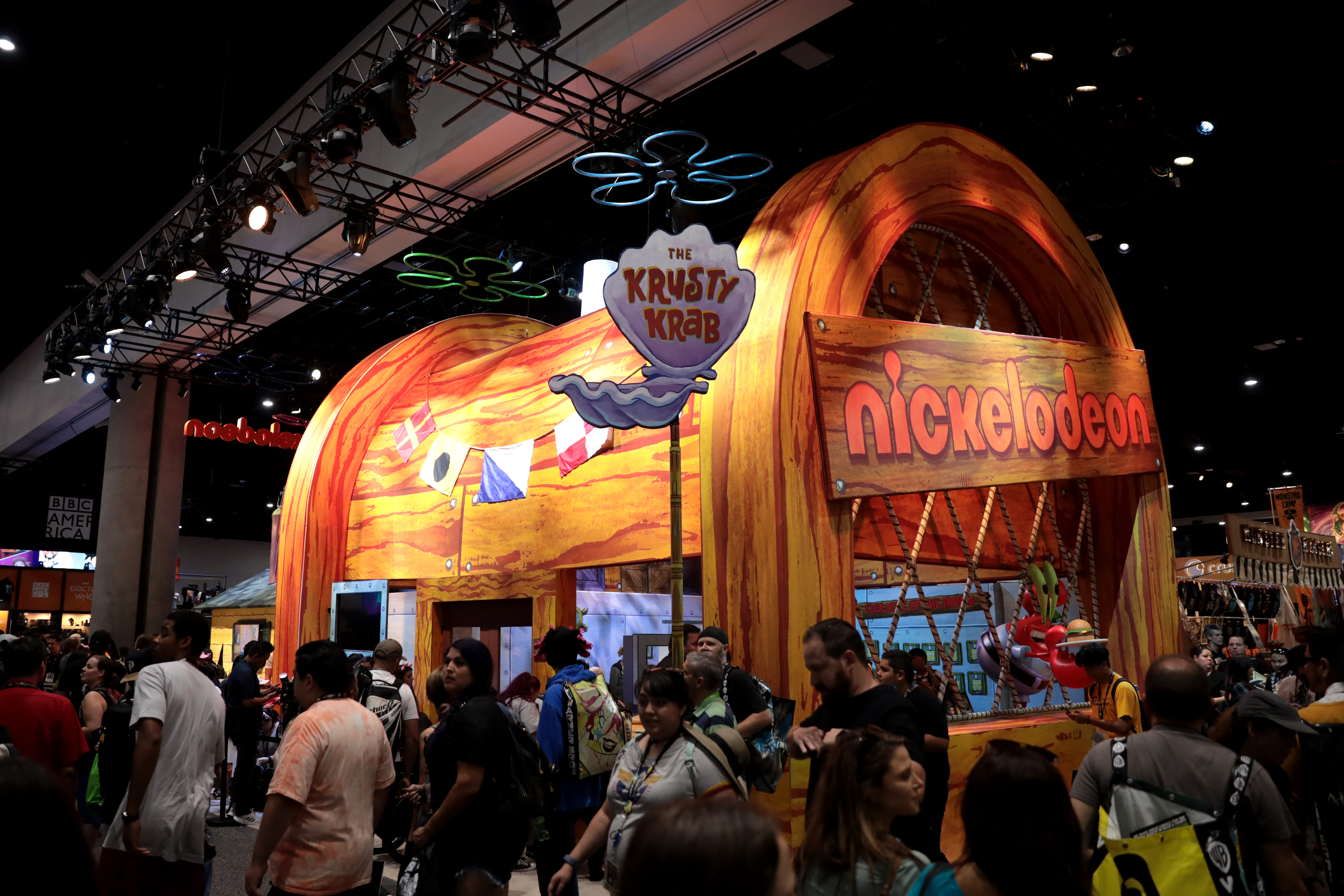
Nickelodeon's Krusty Krab replica at the 2019 San Diego Comic-Con

In celebration of the 20th anniversary of SpongeBob, Nickelodeon recreated the Krusty Krab building at the 2019 San Diego Comic-Con. Inside, attendees could play an interactive game in which they must complete food orders before running out of time. It was part of Nickelodeon's 1,800-square-foot (170 m^{2}) booth at the event, which was dedicated to the show. It featured real-life replicas of Mrs. Puff's Boating School and the Chum Bucket, which stood 22 feet (6.7 m) tall and allowed attendees to buy collectibles and have autographs from the show's cast members. The Los Angeles Times reported that the Bikini Bottom setup "drew hundreds of nostalgic fans" on the first day of the convention. Adweek named it among its ten "Favorite TV-Themed Activations at Comic-Con 2019".
