= Mr. Krabs =

Fictional animated SpongeBob SquarePants character

- SpongeBob SquarePants character
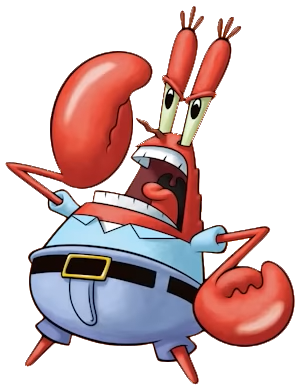
- First appearance: "Help Wanted"; SpongeBob SquarePants; May 1, 1999
- Created by: Stephen Hillenburg
- Designed by: Stephen Hillenburg
- Voiced by: Clancy Brown; Joe Whyte (video games); Patrick Pinney (SpongeBob SquarePants: Typing); Bob Joles (video games)
- Portrayed by: Brian Ray Norris (Broadway)

In-universe information
- Full name: Eugene Harold Krabs
- Species: Crab
- Gender: Male
- Occupation: Owner and manager of the Krusty Krab
- Family: Victor Krabs (father); Betsy Krabs (mother); Unnamed sister
- Significant other: Mrs. Puff (girlfriend)
- Children: Pearl Krabs (daughter)
- Relatives: Redbeard Krabs (grandfather); Sally (aunt); 3 nephews

Eugene Harold Krabs, better known as simply Mr. Krabs, is a fictional character in Nickelodeon's animated television series SpongeBob SquarePants. He is voiced by actor Clancy Brown and first appeared in the series' pilot episode "Help Wanted" on May 1, 1999. The character was created and designed by marine biologist and animator Stephen Hillenburg.

An anthropomorphic crab, Krabs owns and operates the Krusty Krab, a prominent fast food restaurant located in the underwater city of Bikini Bottom. He resides in a hollow anchor with his daughter Pearl, who is a teenage sperm whale. Krabs is miserly obsessed with money and dislikes spending it, but will go to great lengths to make Pearl happy. He tends to worry about his riches and neglects the needs of his employees, SpongeBob and Squidward. He is in a romantic relationship with Mrs. Puff and shares a rivalry with his former best friend Plankton, who owns a struggling restaurant called the Chum Bucket located across the street from the Krusty Krab.

Critical reception for Mr. Krabs was positive upon the series' debut but has been mixed as the show progressed. Critics have offered praise toward his portrayal as a single father to Pearl but criticized a perceived exaggeration of his greed throughout the series' run. The character has been featured in a variety of merchandise, including plush toys, collectible figures, and video games. He also appears in all six SpongeBob films.

== Role in SpongeBob SquarePants ==
Mr. Krabs is commonly known as the greedy founder and owner of the Krusty Krab restaurant, where SpongeBob works as a fry cook and Squidward works as a cashier. The restaurant's success is built on little competition and the popularity of the Krusty Krab's signature sandwich, the Krabby Patty, the formula to which is a closely guarded trade secret. Mr. Krabs frequently exploits his restaurant's popularity, engaging in price gouging and charging his own employees for use of the building's services.

Krabs' rival and former best friend Plankton operates the Chum Bucket, an unsuccessful restaurant across the street from the Krusty Krab. A major plot point throughout the series is Plankton failing to steal the Krabby Patty formula with the help of his computer wife, Karen, under the assumption that they would be able to replicate the burgers and put the Krusty Krab out of business. To avoid this, Krabs goes to extreme lengths to prevent Plankton from obtaining the recipe; he even refuses to allow him to buy a Krabby Patty legitimately out of fear that Plankton might use Karen to reverse-engineer the formula. Krabs also makes it his duty to ensure that the Chum Bucket never has any business whatsoever.

Krabs values money more than his own well-being and assesses the other characters based on their financial value to him. The only exceptions are Pearl and his girlfriend Mrs. Puff. His love for Mrs. Puff is so strong that it temporarily transcends his greed and drives him to buy her expensive gifts. Krabs tolerates his two employees because they work for little pay and because of their positive impact on his finances, but he is quick to rebuke them if they engage in behavior that drives away customers. Krabs has a tentative father-son relationship with SpongeBob; Krabs often scolds him if he gets in trouble, but at times gives him fatherlike advice. Former showrunner Paul Tibbitt has stated that this Krabs-SpongeBob dynamic is his favorite part of the show, telling Digital Spy in 2011 that "the aspect of SpongeBob I love the most is his undying loyalty to Mr. Krabs. No matter how Mr. Krabs treats him. I try to replicate that in my own life in every way."

== Character ==
=== Development ===
An early drawing of Mr. Krabs and Pearl from Hillenburg's series bible.

Mr. Krabs is the only character in SpongeBob initially based on a specific person from Stephen Hillenburg's life. When designing Mr. Krabs, Hillenburg drew inspiration from his former manager at a seafood restaurant. According to Hillenburg, his manager was redheaded, muscular, and a former army cook; these three traits were adapted into Krabs' character, with Krabs' red color standing in for hair. Krabs' speaking manner was also inspired by the restaurant owner, who reminded Hillenburg of a pirate with his strong Maine accent. The "greedy" part of Mr. Krabs' personality was added in by Hillenburg to "give him more personality".

When Hillenburg first created Mr. Krabs, his and Pearl's surname was spelled with a C rather than a K. Thus, the name of Krabs' restaurant was the "Crusty Crab." Hillenburg changed the name shortly before production began on the show's pilot episode, deciding that Ks were funnier and more memorable. The decision to have Mr. Krabs and Pearl live in an anchor was made after production on the first season had started. The original map of the show's setting, which Hillenburg showed Nickelodeon executives as part of his pitch to the network in 1997, did not include an anchor house and instead labeled the Krusty Krab as both of the characters' residence.

Mr. Krabs has a distinct manner of walking; when he moves, he moves his feet very quickly and he is drawn as if he has more than two legs. When directing animation for early episodes, one of Hillenburg's goals was for each character to have a separate walk cycle that showed their personalities; storyboard artist Erik Wiese designed Krabs' walk cycle with the intention of making it cartoonish. Wiese recalled in 2012, "I animated Mr. Krabs' little feet on a four-frame multi-blur cycle—I think it was the best solution to making him walk like a crab." Hillenburg approved of the walk after Wiese demonstrated it on a pencil test machine.

=== Voice ===
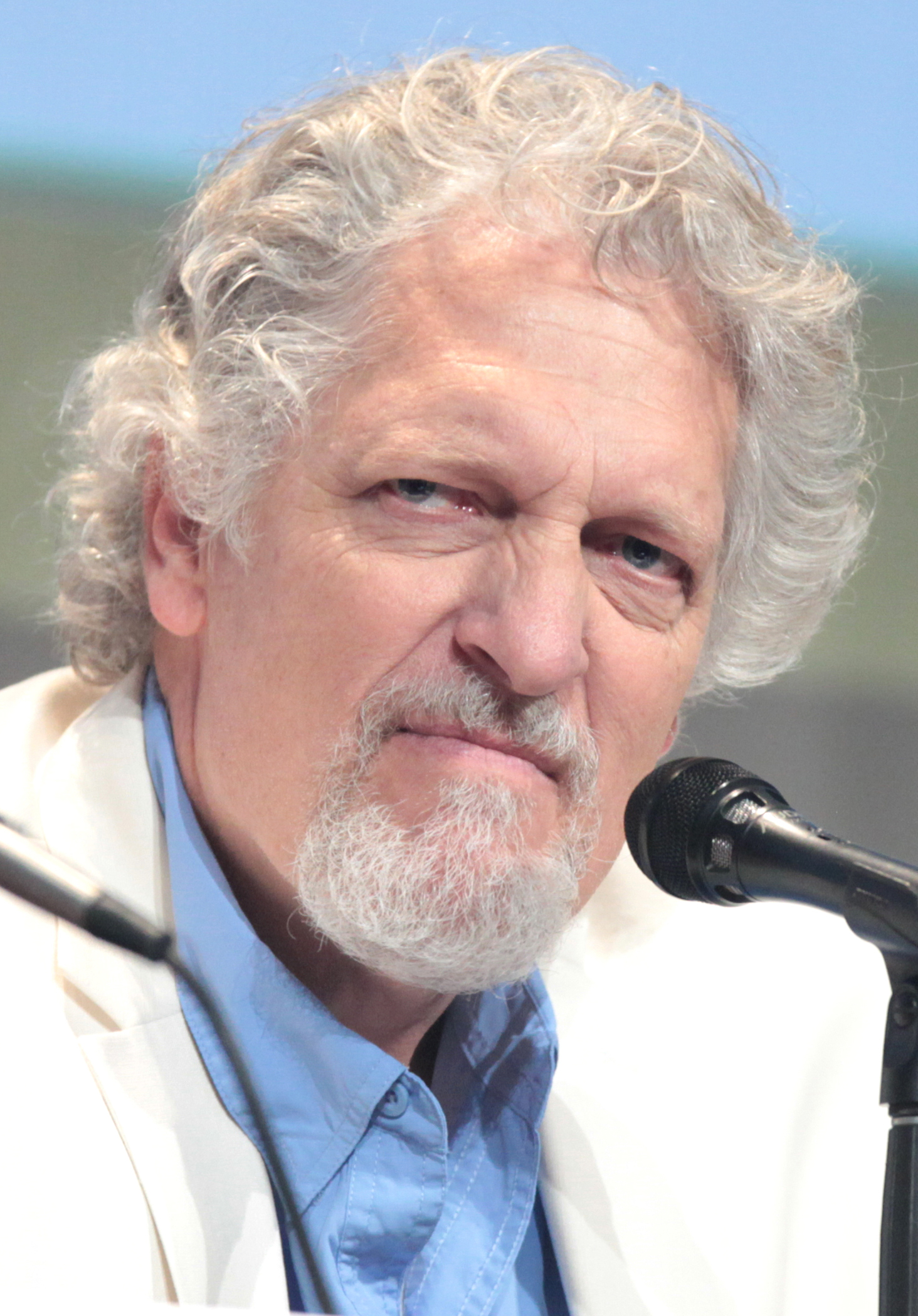
Clancy Brown provides the voice of Mr. Krabs.

Mr. Krabs' voice is provided by American actor Clancy Brown. Brown describes the voice he uses for the character as "piratey," with "a little Scottish brogue." According to Brown, Krabs' voice was improvised during his audition and it was not challenging for him to find the correct voice. Brown is fond of playing the role, having told the New York Post in 2015, "I wouldn't mind doing [the voice] until the end of time. There's just no corollary in live-action work—television or films or anything—to playing a miserly crab on the bottom of the ocean."

In a 2005 interview with the magazine Starlog, Brown described his work on SpongeBob as a "whole other career" compared to his live action roles. Brown's other acting projects have brought some guest actors onto SpongeBob SquarePants, including Dennis Quaid, whose work with Brown on The Express: The Ernie Davis Story led to his selection as a guest star for the episode "Grandpappy the Pirate."

== Reception ==
Critical reception for Mr. Krabs has been mixed, with most criticism directed at his parsimony and the lack of realistic consequences he faces for it. In 2014, Spanish professor Pancracio Celdrán criticized the positive portrayal of Mr. Krabs' stinginess in front of young audiences. Economist Sarah Newcomb described Mr. Krabs as a negative stereotype, writing in the Wiley book Loaded that "King Midas, Ebenezer Scrooge, Mr. Burns, and Mr. Krabs are the same recycled character, representing the person who cares for money above all."

Polish scholar Barbara Czarniawska disliked the heroic portrayal of Mr. Krabs in the second SpongeBob film, despite being "a ruthless capitalist who exploits his customers and his workers alike." She later criticized how the show seemingly normalized the character's use of "legal forms of manipulation and exploitative power relations in business." Conversely, political activist Howie Klein of The Huffington Post offered a more positive interpretation of the character, saying in 2006 that Mr. Krabs is not "exactly an evil villain; he's just a greed-obsessed Republican type." Klein interviewed SpongeBob's voice actor Tom Kenny on the topic; Kenny compared Krabs to oil businessman Erle P. Halliburton, then called the character a comedic representation of "unchecked, unthinking, unregulated capitalism. Everything [to Krabs] is about the bottom line, not about what's socially responsible."

In his 2011 book SpongeBob SquarePants and Philosophy, political scientist Joseph J. Foy discusses Krabs' antagonistic side over several chapters. Foy argues that Krabs, not Plankton and Karen, is the true evil character in the series. He also notes his problem with Mr. Krabs' character that "Krabs never seems to learn from the suffering he undergoes, or from witnessing the pain and struggles he inflicts on others."

In an article for Complex, Debbie Encalada praised the SpongeBob series as a whole for challenging social norms; Mr. Krabs' portrayal as a single father to Pearl was specifically highlighted as an example of the show's "subversiveness by subtly challenging the idea of the nuclear family." Newsday's Meghan Giannotta wrote positively of the character in a 2016 article: "Mr. Krabs ... may be known for being cheap, but he's also determined and a good friend and father. He'll do whatever it takes to make his daughter Pearl happy and he goes to extreme measures to help protect his fast-food business." In a review of the season four episode "Have You Seen This Snail?," television critic Tom Shales described Krabs as "good-natured" and as one of "the things people love about SpongeBob." Paul Mavis of DVD Talk named the Krabs-centric episode "Krusty Krab Training Video" one of the series' best, calling its humorous portrayal of Mr. Krabs' backstory the highlight.

Basketball player LeBron James has stated that if he "could be any character on the show, [he] would be Mr. Krabs." Cartoonist Michael Cavna commented on James' high opinion of Krabs, writing in The Washington Post that he found it intriguing how "the gazillionaire NBA hoopster cites his respect for ... the show's resident tightwad." Mr. Krabs is also the favorite SpongeBob character of football running back Cedric Benson.

== In other media ==
Mr. Krabs has been featured in various merchandise such as plush toys, video games, comics, and trading cards. The Krabs family restaurant, the Krusty Krab, has been the basis for a Lego playset and many replicas at attractions. A float modeled after the Krusty Krab, featuring a costumed mascot of Pearl that greeted guests and an animatronic Mr. Krabs, regularly appeared at Sea World's weekly "SpongeBob ParadePants" parade. A full-size replica of the building was built in Ramallah, Palestine in 2014. In January 2016, Nickelodeon's parent company Viacom filed a lawsuit against the operators of a similar for-profit "Krusty Krab" restaurant set to open in Texas. A Texas federal judge ruled in January 2017 that the planned restaurant violated Viacom's rights to the SpongeBob property, thus halting its construction.

In 2011, the indie rock group Yo La Tengo performed a live version of the Krusty Krab commercial from the episode "As Seen on TV" at El Rey Theatre in Los Angeles, California. Included as part of Yo La Tengo's first tour, it starred Ira Kaplan as Mr. Krabs. Billy Gil of L.A. Record praised the performance as a whole and called Kaplan's impression "dead-on." An episode of the sketch comedy series Robot Chicken titled "Major League of Extraordinary Gentlemen" includes a skit that stars Mr. Krabs and Pearl. The segment, animated in stop motion like most other sketches on the program, features Mr. Krabs using crab legs as the secret ingredient for Krabby Patties.

A track on The Best Day Ever, a 2006 soundtrack album, titled "Fishin' for Money" features the vocal performance of Clancy Brown as Mr. Krabs. In the 2017 Broadway musical based on SpongeBob, Krabs, played by Brian Ray Norris, sings a duet with Pearl titled "Daddy Knows Best", an original composition written by Alex Ebert that highlights the characters' differences. In his pre-Broadway review of the musical, Variety's Steven Oxman asserted that the musical's version of Mr. Krabs "fall[s] flat" compared to his animated counterpart, and that the theatrical adaptation "finds no humor or wit or even edge in Mr. Krabs' obsession with money, nor in the nonsensical element that his daughter is a whale."
