= The Sponge Who Could Fly =

- SpongeBob SquarePants episode
- Promotional artwork for the episode depicting SpongeBob and the jellyfish flying together with various residents watching them
- Episode no.: Season 3 Episode 19
- Directed by: Paul Tibbitt; Kent Osborne
- Written by: Paul Tibbitt; Kent Osborne; Merriwether Williams
- Narrated by: Tom Kenny
- Production codes: 5572-217; 5572-219
- Original air date: March 21, 2003 (Note: The episode was first released in The Sponge Who Can Fly VHS and Lost At Sea DVD on March 4, 2003.)
- Running time: 22 minutes

Episode chronology
← Previous "Plankton's Army"	Next → "SpongeBob Meets the Strangler"
- SpongeBob SquarePants (season 3)

"The Sponge Who Could Fly", also known as "The SpongeBob SquarePants Lost Episode", is the 19th episode of the third season and the 59th overall episode of the American animated television series SpongeBob SquarePants. It was written by Paul Tibbitt, Kent Osborne (who both are also storyboard directors) and Merriwether Williams, with Andrew Overtoom, Tom Yasumi and Mark O'Hare serving as animation directors. The episode was produced in 2002 and aired on Nickelodeon in the United States on March 21, 2003.

In this musical episode, SpongeBob, who always wished he could fly with the jellyfish, gains the ability to fly by putting a hair dryer in his pants. The episode is set within a frame story that features Patchy the Pirate. SpongeBob creator Stephen Hillenburg makes an on-screen cameo as a miner inside a treasure chest.

The episode became available on the VHS of the same name and the Lost at Sea DVD on March 4, 2003. Tie-in promotions were made with Burger King, which released a series of toys. Upon release, "The Sponge Who Could Fly" gained seven million views receiving mixed to positive reviews from television critics, especially concerning its live action segments. "The Sponge Who Could Fly" was adapted into a musical called SpongeBob SquarePants Live! The Sponge Who Could Fly!, which toured selected cities in Asia in 2007 and the United Kingdom in 2009.

== Plot ==
The French narrator informs the audience that a lost episode of SpongeBob SquarePants was discovered the previous week at Nickelodeon Studios. In Encino, California, SpongeBob fan club president Patchy the Pirate, who was chosen to present the episode, informs unseen children that he has lost it and tells them to forget about SpongeBob. Following an in memoriam-type tribute to SpongeBob showing a montage of clips from past episodes, Patchy wishes he had a treasure map to help him find the lost episode, and one is immediately flung through his living room window. He and Potty the Parrot follow the map to a chest buried "above the surface" of a sandy playground, from which a miner emerges and gives him a VHS tape containing the episode. Patchy returns home in glee to play the tape, which shows a series of SpongeBob walk cycles set to music before the SMPTE color bars appear. Feeling "betrayed", an enraged Patchy denounces his fan club, disposes of all his Spongebob merchandise and runs out of the house. Potty then alerts Patchy that the real episode's countdown has begun; he rewinds his tantrum and sits down to watch with Potty.

In the episode itself, SpongeBob wishes he could fly with the jellyfish. He makes several attempts to do so using a biplane, a winged bat costume, a lawn chair with balloons, and a giant kite pulled by a bicycle. All of these attempts fail, and SpongeBob faces ridicule from others, while Old Man Jenkins, appearing as a farmer and then as a sailor, expresses his disdain for flying machines as he falls victim to two of the accidents. He chastises them for mocking his dreams, and they respond that they all have had unfulfilled dreams, becoming an angry mob to chase him. SpongeBob runs off a cliff and falls into a truck of mud, then into a truck of feathers. In a scene only shown on TV airings, the French Narrator tells the audience to stay tuned for the second half of the episode.

At home, SpongeBob has given up on his dream. He dries himself after a shower when he receives an insulting phone call and puts the hair dryer in his pants. While he talks, the dryer inflates his pants, giving him the ability to fly. He goes around helping people, earning their admiration and becoming a local hero. However, the other characters continue to ask increasingly unnecessary favors of him, leaving him no time to fly with the jellyfish. When he tries to escape to Jellyfish Fields, an angry mob forms and chases him, but is unable to catch him. Old Man Jenkins, now a cannonball stunt performer, blasts SpongeBob, destroying the pants and sending him plummeting to the ground as revenge for the accidents that he caused. Feeling guilty for this, the people mob holds a funeral for his ruined pants. Depressed, SpongeBob decides go home, but the jellyfish help him fly and take him back home. Patrick arrives and asks if he wants to fly with him to the local pizza parlor. SpongeBob declines, having learned that he should leave flying to the jellyfish. Patrick then flies away naturally. A confused SpongeBob wonders if Patrick just flew, but dismisses this and reenters his house, then looks after Patrick out of curiosity.

An overjoyed Patchy wishes to replay the episode, but finds the TV remote missing. His neighbor Mrs. Johnson returns it to him by throwing it through the window. However, his difficulty with the remote (which results in him switching channels, shutting off the lights, and making a mariachi band appear out of nowhere while fighting Potty for it) causes him to accidentally destroy the tape, making the filmstrip pour out of his VCR and entangle him. The narrator assures the audience that whether or not the lost episode will remain lost, the spirit and memory of SpongeBob will endure. As the stars form a constellation of SpongeBob in the night sky above Patchy's house, the narrator tells the viewers to "get lost" while bidding farewell.

== Cast ==
- Tom Kenny as SpongeBob SquarePants, Narrator, Gary, Grandpa SquarePants, Fish #86, Fish #1, Patchy the Pirate
- Bill Fagerbakke as Patrick Star, Patrick's Grandpa, Vendor Fish
- Rodger Bumpass as Squidward Tentacles, Phone Fish
- Clancy Brown as Mr. Krabs
- Mr. Lawrence as Plankton, Larry the Lobster, Anchor, Hair Piece Fish
- Mary Jo Catlett as Mrs. Puff
- Dee Bradley Baker as Farmer/Sailor/Cannonball Jenkins, Fish #37b, Fish #92, Fish #41, TV Announcer
- Sirena Irwin as Mom, Girl Fish #7, Fish #6, Fat Mom
- Jesse David Corti as Boy Fish #103, Boy Fish #151, Kid Fish #2
- Sara Paxton as Kid Fish #1
- Stephen Hillenburg as Potty, Miner
- Paul Lutz as Store Clerk (scene deleted)
- Jonathan Silsby as Puppeteer
- Kent Osborne as Clown
- Dylan Haggerty as Newscaster
- Jeanette Miller as Mrs. Johnson

== Production ==
"The Sponge Who Could Fly" was written by Paul Tibbitt, Kent Osborne and Merriwether Williams, with Andrew Overtoom and Tom Yasumi serving as animation directors. Tibbitt and Osborne also functioned as storyboard directors, and Carson Kugler, Caleb Meurer and William Reiss served as storyboard artists. Derek Drymon served as creative director. The episode originally aired on Nickelodeon in the United States on March 21, 2003, with a TV-Y parental rating. "The Sponge Who Could Fly" was one of the few episodes of the third season that aired during the production of the series' 2004 feature film, while production on the series itself was halted in 2002. This resulted in few airings of new episodes. Nickelodeon announced nine "as-yet-unaired" episodes would be shown. During the break in TV production, "The Sponge Who Could Fly" first aired during a two-hour "Sponge"-a-thon, while the other eight were broadcast subsequently.

Mark O'Hare directed and animated the walk cycles in the beginning of the episode. The cycle originated when supervising producer at the time Derek Drymon approached O'Hare for a freelance job on the show. He remembered the crew gave him a "bad" synthesizer song, and he was told to do "some kind of weird walk to it". Eventually, Drymon saw the cycle and referred to it as "The Lost Episode" walk. O'Hare, who initially believed that the scene he animated "ended up in the cutting room floor" based on Drymon's description, eventually realized that "The Lost Episode" was the actual name of the episode. The live action scenes were directed by Mark Osborne, and were hosted by Tom Kenny in character as Patchy the Pirate, the president of the fictional SpongeBob SquarePants fan club.

"The Sponge Who Could Fly" was released on a VHS tape of the same name on March 4, 2003. "The Sponge Who Could Fly" was released on the DVD compilation titled SpongeBob SquarePants: Lost at Sea also on March 4, 2003. The episode was also included in the SpongeBob SquarePants: The Complete 3rd Season DVD on September 27, 2005. On September 22, 2009, "The Sponge Who Could Fly" was released on the SpongeBob SquarePants: The First 100 Episodes DVD, alongside all the episodes of seasons one through five.

== Marketing ==
To promote the episode, Nickelodeon launched an on-air campaign called "SpongeBob's Lost Episode", which culminated with the premiere of "The Sponge Who Could Fly". Nickelodeon also partnered with Burger King to release a line of toys as a marketing tie-in to the event. The toy line consisted of eight figures, including SpongeBob Silly Squirter, Swing Time Patrick, Jellyfish Fields, Plankton Bubble Up, Squirt N' Whistle Squidward, Plush Shakin' SpongeBob, Karate Chop Sandy and Gravity Defying Gary. The promotion ran for five weeks, during which time one of the popular items on the "Big Kids" menu, Chicken Tender, came "in fun star and lightning bolt shapes." Craig Braasch, vice president of global advertising and promotions for the Burger King Corporation, said "These eight new, fun, seaworthy toys inside our Big Kids Meals provide hours of aquatic entertainment for our young customers."

Each of the toys released included a "clue card" containing a SpongeBob SquarePants character riddle. By visiting Nickelodeon's website, the viewers could answer the riddle in order to win digital SpongeBob trading cards. They could also enter sweepstakes to win an at-home SpongeBob SquarePants party for 25 people where "The Sponge Who Could Fly" was viewed on the winner's new large-screen television. Pam Kaufman, senior vice president of marketing for Nickelodeon, said "We are proud of the relationship we have built with Burger King Corporation and excited that SpongeBob is returning for his second Burger King promotion. The promotion is sure to bring the young Burger King customers all the fun they have come to expect from Nickelodeon and SpongeBob SquarePants."

== Reception ==
Upon its release, "The Sponge Who Could Fly" was viewed by over seven million people. However, the episode received mixed reviews from critics. David Kronke of the Los Angeles Daily News criticized the special as being a standard episode that has been padded out to an extra length, with the live action Patchy the Pirate segments being "not terribly funny" and "what should be lost." In his review for DVD Verdict, Bryan Pope criticized "The Sponge Who Could Fly" as "The one misstep" in an otherwise strong third season, as he felt it "veers too far away from Bikini Bottom and into unfunny live action territory." Tom Maurstad of The Dallas Morning News said "The Sponge Who Could Fly" was "not a very good episode," describing it as "another SpongeBob-and-his-love-of-jellyfish story" that does "not [have] enough laughs" and having "too much drippy sentimentality."

Dana Orlando of the Philadelphia Daily News expressed the opinion that both the cartoon and the live action segments of the episode were funny, and described "The Sponge Who Could Fly" as one of the best episodes to date. In 2003, the episode received a Hors Concours Honor for Recently Telecast Programs at the Banff Rockie Awards.

== Musical adaptation ==
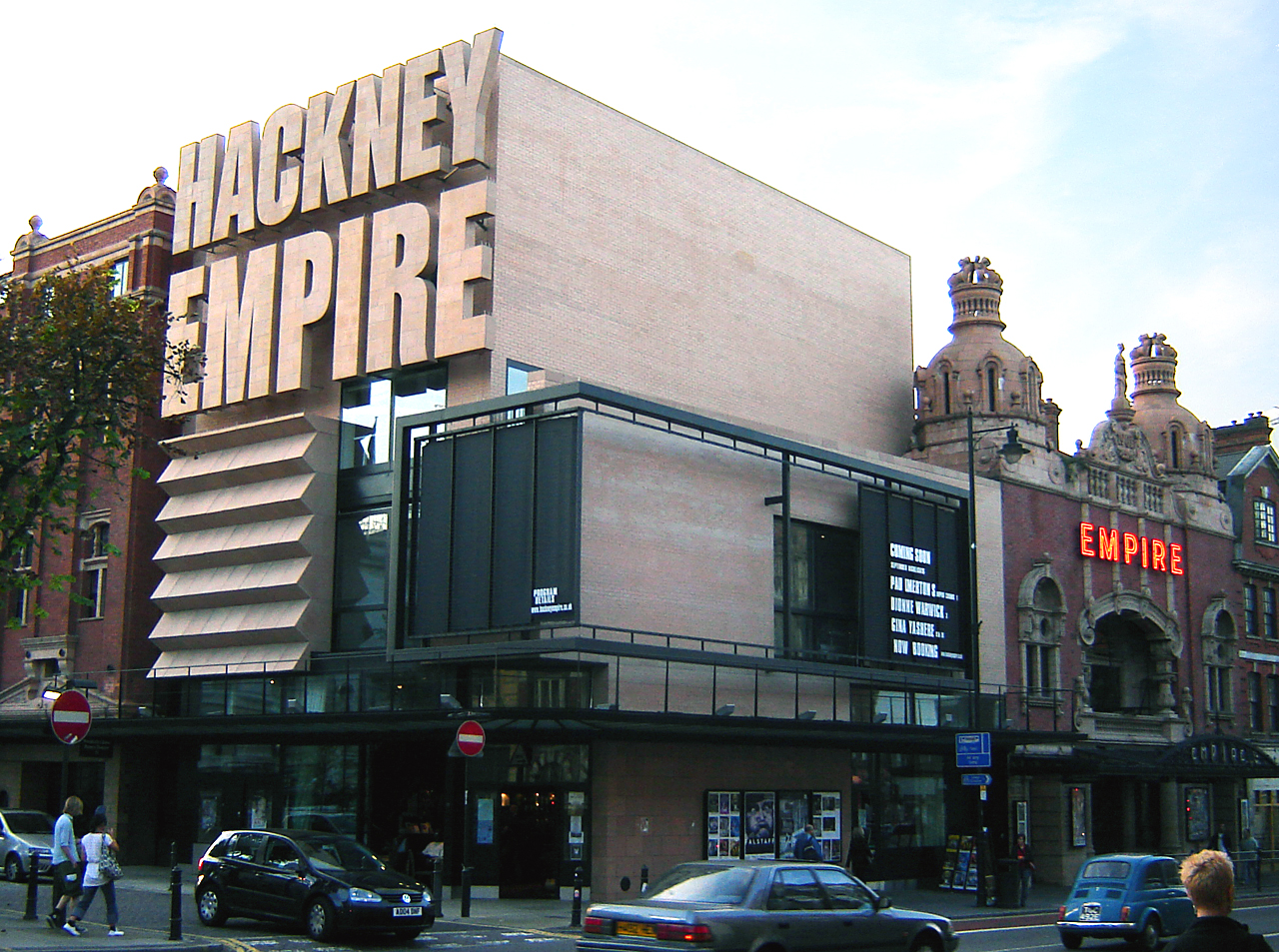
The 2009 UK musical adaptation of the episode called SpongeBob SquarePants: The Sponge Who Could Fly! A New Musical opened at the Hackney Empire in London.

"The Sponge Who Could Fly" was adapted into a musical called SpongeBob SquarePants Live! The Sponge Who Could Fly!. It was launched in Singapore at The Singapore Expo Hall on May 31, 2007, and was the first customization of SpongeBob into a live musical event, joining a list of TV-inspired live offerings from Nickelodeon that includes Blue's Clues and Dora the Explorer. The musical also marked the first time Nickelodeon premiered a live tour outside the United States. The show is a story of courage and coming of age which tells of SpongeBob's desire to fly with the jellyfish of Jellyfish Fields. It traveled to five cities across Asia, including Singapore, Kuala Lumpur, Jakarta, Bangkok, and Manila, before it toured cities of Australia and New Zealand. A Mandarin-language version toured China and Hong Kong in the fall.

The script was written by Steven Banks, who had become the head writer for the series in Season 4, with songs by Eban Schletter. Gip Hoppe served as director, with choreographer and associate director Jenn Rapp, and the set was designed by Rialto vet David Gallo. The musical was produced by Nickelodeon and MTVN Kids and Family Group, partnered with Broadway Asia Entertainment.

In 2009, the show toured the United Kingdom and Ireland with the name of SpongeBob SquarePants: The Sponge Who Could Fly! A New Musical. It opened at the Hackney Empire in London, England on February 3, 2009. The musical played at Milton Keynes Theatre from February 17-21 before touring the UK from March 2009 for six months with performances at the Hammersmith Apollo, Southend, Edinburgh, Birmingham, Reading, Salford, Sunderland, Nottingham, Liverpool, High Wycombe, Plymouth, Bristol, Cardiff, Oxford, Killarney and Dublin.

Alison Pollard choreographed and directed the UK adaptation and said that the episode already had a few songs in it, which helped with the conversion to a musical. She said "The episode chosen for the show already had four or five really catchy tunes in it, and the idea that he wants to fly with jellyfish is nice for the stage as well." The adaptation includes twelve songs of various styles.

English actor Chris Coxon played the role of SpongeBob. Coxon was a fan of the series and said "If I'd been told a year ago that I would be playing SpongeBob today I would have loved it, although I'm not sure I would have believed it." Coxon admitted it was difficult to adapt the show into a musical. He remarked "It is difficult because you are trying to recreate this character that is so fluid on screen. For example I'm just getting used to my square costume, although it does have an incredible design, so that, although I am restricted, I can do a lot of the things he does in the cartoon."

=== Critical reception ===
The energetic performances and colourful set design more than make up for this and at 90 minutes (including the break) the show is short enough to prevent little ones from getting itchy feet.

— Gordon Barr and Roger Domeneghetti in their review for the Evening Chronicle.

The musical was well received by most critics. In his review for The Sentinel, Chris Blackhurst brought along a seven-year-old child called Dylan Brayford, and Dylan's 34-year-old godfather, James Humphreys, from Nantwich to watch the musical. The two "weren't disappointed." Blackhurst said "The fast-paced tale of courage and dreams kept both entertained with plenty of hilarious moments for the children and a sprinkle of gags which flew over younger fans' heads but brought a wry smile to mums and dads' faces." Brayford summed it up, saying "It was good, but not quite as good as the TV show."

Gordon Barr and Roger Domeneghetti of the Evening Chronicle described the show as "a silly riot of colour[...] as you'd have to expect from an adaptation of a cartoon TV show." They lauded the song called "Ker Ching" performed by Mr. Krabs, saying "[It] stands out above the rest." Viv Hardwick of The Northern Echo said "Younger ones are just pleased to see a colourful collection of characters, vaguely resembling the ten year-old TV show cast, cavorting around the stage." Hardwick praised the role of Charles Brunton as Squidward Tentacles while John Fricker (Patrick Star) and Martin Johnston (Mr. Krabs) were said to "win the biggest costume contest."
