= Mid-Life Crustacean =

- SpongeBob SquarePants episode
- Title card
- Episode no.: Season 3 Episode 15b
- Directed by: C. H. Greenblatt and Kaz (storyboard directors); Chuck Klein (storyboard artist); Frank Weiss (animation); Derek Drymon (creative); Alan Smart (supervision)
- Written by: C. H. Greenblatt; Kaz; Mark O'Hare
- Production code: 5572-210
- Original air date: January 24, 2003

Episode chronology
| ← Previous "The Great Snail Race" | Next → "Born Again Krabs" |
- SpongeBob SquarePants (season 3)

"Mid-Life Crustacean" is the second segment of the 15th episode of the third season and the 55th overall episode of the American animated television series SpongeBob SquarePants. The episode originally released in Canada on November 6, 2002, before its official premiere in the United States on Nickelodeon on January 24, 2003. It was storyboard-directed by C. H. Greenblatt and Kaz written by Greenblatt, Kaz, and Mark O'Hare, with the animation directed by Frank Weiss. Chuck Klein serves as the storyboard artist.

In the episode, Mr. Krabs, depressed about getting older, desires to feel young again and joins SpongeBob and Patrick on their big night of partying out on the town, only to discover it consists of mundane activities. He is frustrated and disappointed until he is informed that the itinerary culminates in a panty raid.

"Mid-Life Crustacean" has been well received by critics and fans; despite this, the episode was eventually pulled from Nickelodeon's rotation in 2018, and from the Paramount+ service in 2021, with the episode's prominent "panty raid" scene, as well as the wake of the #MeToo and Time's Up movements often being cited as the reason for its removal. The episode and portions of it are still officially available on YouTube, and is still featured in home media releases.

== Plot ==
A depressed Mr. Krabs wakes one morning to a song on his clock radio with lyrics that remind him of his advancing age as he struggles to get out of bed. At breakfast, he asks Pearl if she thinks he's old, which Pearl says she does; he tries using the slang word "coral" as an alternative to "cool" in conversation to try to sound younger, which Pearl says ruins the term. On his way to work, he becomes increasingly agitated as he is continuously reminded of his age. At the Krusty Krab, after overhearing a patron comparing him to an "old and dried out" Krabby Patty, he asks to join SpongeBob and Patrick's "big night out" in order to feel young again.

During the evening, SpongeBob, Patrick, and Mr. Krabs partake in bizarre, bland, and/or childish activities, none of which satisfies Mr. Krabs. At an arcade, SpongeBob, Patrick and several children repeatedly ask Mr. Krabs if he is feeling younger now, causing him to lose his temper and berate the duo. Preparing to cancel his night out, Mr. Krabs changes his mind when Patrick reveals that they are going out on a panty raid.

When the trio sneaks into a house to grab a woman's pair of underwear from her dresser drawer, Mr. Krabs briefly rejoices, finally feeling young again, before they are caught by the home's owner, Krabs' mother; SpongeBob and Patrick never told him it was her house they were raiding. Because of the boys' lie by omission, she grounds Mr. Krabs for the rest of the night. SpongeBob follows him and apologizes, to which Mr. Krabs forgives him, quipping that spending the night in his childhood bedroom makes him feel younger. As SpongeBob leaves, Mr. Krabs' mother orders him to shut off his bedroom lights, to which he dejectedly abides.

== Reception and controversy ==
During the episode, Mr. Krabs (left) partakes in a panty raid with SpongeBob and Patrick to treat his midlife crisis.

"Mid-Life Crustacean" is no longer rerunning on Nickelodeon as of 2018, and is one of the few installments of the SpongeBob franchise not available to watch on Paramount+. It is still available on home media releases, and the full episode is available for purchase on YouTube and on iTunes (albeit only as part of the "From the Beginning Part 2" collection), and pieces of the episode can be still seen ongoing on the Nickelodeon and SpongeBob SquarePants official YouTube channels.

When the episode was removed from rotation, there was originally no reason given by Nickelodeon, but it was heavily suggested that the panty raid scene has led to its removal. A Nickelodeon representative has claimed the episode was pulled because it was deemed inappropriate for young children, despite other episodes in the franchise containing adult and edgy humor akin to The Ren & Stimpy Show, another show from Nickelodeon that Vincent Waller and some of the other staff of SpongeBob have previously worked on.

In a 2019 ranking of SpongeBob's top 100 episodes, TV Guide listed "Mid-Life Crustacean" as the 79th best episode.

Allegra Frank at Slate commented in 2021 "...as a nostalgia buff who looks to Paramount+ solely to sate that need, seeing a small piece of SpongeBob history be stripped away by its parent company is jarring. There are tons of other 11-minute SpongeBob adventures to enjoy, but there's nothing like watching an episode and having that warm feeling of remembering it; I'm sad I won't get to have that with that now-infamous 'panty raid' episode anymore." In a 2021 article discussing the controversy around the episode by Comic Book Resources, writer Reuben Baron considered it a great episode, reasoning "There's tons of great character-based humor driven by Mr. Krabs' mid-life crisis, Pearl's embarrassment about her dad and SpongeBob and Patrick's gleeful strangeness."

The episode was accidentally made available for streaming in July 2023 due to a technical error on the Paramount+ channel on Prime Video. The glitch was fixed almost immediately after.
