= SpongeBob SquarePants season 3 =

Season of television series

SpongeBob SquarePants
- Season 3
- DVD cover
- Showrunner: Stephen Hillenburg
- Starring: Tom Kenny; Bill Fagerbakke; Rodger Bumpass; Clancy Brown; Mr. Lawrence; Jill Talley; Carolyn Lawrence; Mary Jo Catlett; Lori Alan
- No. of episodes: 20 (37 segments)

Release
- Original network: Nickelodeon
- Original release: October 5, 2001 – October 11, 2004

Season chronology
- ← Previous; Season 2 Next → Season 4

The third season of the American animated television series SpongeBob SquarePants, created by Stephen Hillenburg, aired on Nickelodeon from October 5, 2001, to October 11, 2004, and consists of 20 half-hour episodes. The series chronicles the exploits and adventures of the title character and his various friends in the fictional underwater city of Bikini Bottom. The season was executive produced by series creator Hillenburg and supervising produced by Derek Drymon, whom the former also acted as the showrunner. It is notable for being the last season with Hillenburg as the series' showrunner following uncertainty within the network over whether a fourth season was possible, with Nickelodeon ultimately deciding on making more episodes as a result of the show's continued growth.

The season received acclaim from media critics and fans. During its run, SpongeBob SquarePants became the highest rated children's show on cable, with over 50 million viewers a month. The show received several recognitions, including its nomination at the Primetime Emmy Awards for Outstanding Children's Program. The episodes "New Student Starfish" and "Clams" were nominated for Outstanding Animated Program (for Programming Less Than One Hour) category, while the entry "SpongeBob B.C. (Ugh)" was also nominated for the same category. The season was also the first time the show received a nomination at the Kids' Choice Awards and won. It won the 2003 Kids' Choice Awards for Favorite Cartoon, and also won the following year's Kids' Choice Award for the same category. The popularity of the show continued to grow during its run, which included more merchandising opportunities and celebrities reported to be fans of the show.

The SpongeBob SquarePants: The Complete 3rd Season DVD was released in Region 1 on September 27, 2005, Region 2 on December 3, 2007, and Region 4 on November 8, 2007. Several compilation DVDs that contained episodes from the season were released prior.

== Production ==
The season's executive producer was series creator Stephen Hillenburg, who also functioned as the showrunner. During production of the previous season, Nickelodeon already picked up a third season for SpongeBob SquarePants on September 20, 2000, due to the show's high ratings across basic cable television. It premiered more than a year later, on October 5, 2001.

Following production on the series' third season, production halted in 2002 as Hillenburg and the staff started work on the 2004 film The SpongeBob SquarePants Movie. As a result, the show went into a "self-imposed" two-year hiatus on television. During the break, Nickelodeon expanded the programming for the third season to cover the delay; however, according to Nickelodeon executive Eric Coleman, "there certainly was a delay and a built-up demand." Nickelodeon announced nine "as-yet-unaired" (full) episodes would be shown. "The Sponge Who Could Fly" first aired during a two-hour "Sponge"-a-thon, while the other eight were broadcast subsequently.

Once the production on the film was completed, Hillenburg wanted to end the series "so the show wouldn't jump the shark", citing concerns among executives at Nickelodeon that the show "had peaked" during the movie's production; however, the network "couldn't afford to [end the show]" due to its massive financial success. Hillenburg resigned as the series' showrunner, and appointed Paul Tibbitt, who previously served as the show's supervising producer, writer, director, and storyboard artist, to overtake the role. Hillenburg considered Tibbitt one of his favorite members of the show's crew, and "totally trusted him". Tibbitt held the showrunner and executive producer position until 2016. Hillenburg did not have any direct involvement during this time, but reviewed each episode and delivered suggestions. He said "I figure when I'm pretty old I can still paint [...] I don't know about running shows."

Animation was handled overseas in South Korea at Rough Draft Studios. Animation directors credited with episodes in the third season included Sean Dempsey, Andrew Overtoom, Frank Weiss, and Tom Yasumi. (Note: Information is taken from the opening credits of each episode.) Episodes were written by a team of writers, which consisted of Walt Dohrn, C. H. Greenblatt, Sam Henderson, Kaz, Jay Lender, Joe Liss ("The Great Snail Race" only), Mark O'Hare, Kent Osborne, Aaron Springer, Paul Tibbitt, and Merriwether Williams. The season was storyboarded by Zeus Cervas, Dohrn, Greenblatt, Henderson, Kaz, Chuck Klein, Carson Kugler, Lender, Heather Martinez, Caleb Meurer, O'Hare, Osborne, Dan Povenmire, William Reiss, Mike Roth, Springer, Tibbitt, and Wiese.

== Cast ==
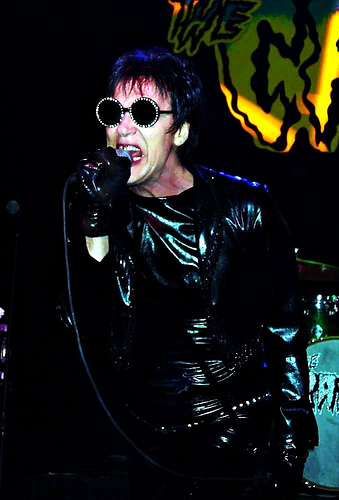
Lux Interior, the lead vocalist of the Cramps, voiced the lead singer of the Bird Brains in "Party Pooper Pants".

The third season featured Tom Kenny as the voice of the title character SpongeBob SquarePants and his pet snail Gary. SpongeBob's best friend, a starfish named Patrick Star, was voiced by Bill Fagerbakke, while Rodger Bumpass played the voice of Squidward Tentacles, an arrogant and ill-tempered octopus. Other members of the cast were Clancy Brown as Mr. Krabs, a miserly crab obsessed with money and SpongeBob's boss at the Krusty Krab; Mr. Lawrence as Plankton, a small green copepod and Mr. Krabs' business rival; Jill Talley as Karen, Plankton's sentient computer sidekick; Carolyn Lawrence as Sandy Cheeks, a squirrel from Texas; Mary Jo Catlett as Mrs. Puff, SpongeBob's boating school teacher; and Lori Alan as Pearl, a teenage whale who is Mr. Krabs' daughter.

In addition to the regular cast members, episodes feature guest voices from many ranges of professions, including actors and musicians. Former McHale's Navy actors Ernest Borgnine and Tim Conway returned in the episode "Mermaid Man and Barnacle Boy IV", reprising their roles as Mermaid Man and Barnacle Boy, respectively. Borgnine and Conway reappeared in the episode "Mermaid Man and Barnacle Boy V", which was also guest starred by John Rhys-Davies as Man Ray, and Martin Olson as the Chief. Brian Doyle-Murray reprised his role as the Flying Dutchman for "Born Again Krabs". Radio disc jockey Rodney Bingenheimer guest starred in the episode "Krab Borg" as the DJ. In "Party Pooper Pants", American rock band the Cramps lead vocalist Lux Interior performed the voice of the lead singer of the all-bird rock band called the Bird Brains. Kevin Michael Richardson also appeared in the live action segments of the episode as King Neptune. Various other characters were voiced by Dee Bradley Baker, Steve Kehela, Frank Welker, and Thomas F. Wilson.

== Reception ==
During its third season, SpongeBob SquarePants passed Rugrats and earned the title of being the highest rated children's show on cable, with a 6.7 rating and 2.2 million kids 2 to 11 in the second quarter of 2002, up 22% over 2001. Forbes called the show "a $1 billion honeypot," and said the show is "almost single-handedly responsible for making Viacom's Nickelodeon the most-watched cable channel during the day and the second most popular during prime time." It was also reported that of the 50 million viewers who watch it every month, 20 million are adults.

The season was acclaimed by media critics and fans. In 2002, the show itself was nominated at the Primetime Emmy Awards for Outstanding Children's Program. Its episodes "New Student Starfish" and "Clams" were nominated for Outstanding Animated Program (for Programming Less Than One Hour) category, while the entry "Ugh" was also nominated for the same category. The show also won the Television Critics Association Awards for Outstanding Achievement in Youth Programming. The season was also the first time the show received a nomination at the Kids' Choice Awards and won. In 2003, the show won the 2003 Kids' Choice Awards for Favorite Cartoon, and also won the succeeding year's Kids' Choice Award for the same category. At the 2003 Golden Reel Awards, the show won Best Sound Editing in Television Animation and Best Sound Editing in Television Animation — Music categories for the episodes "Nasty Patty"/"Idiot Box" and "Wet Painters"/"Krusty Krab Training Video", respectively. The episodes "The Great Snail Race" and "Mid-Life Crustacean" won at the 2004 Golden Reel Awards for "Best Sound Editing in Television Animation — Music", while the episode "Mid-Life Crustacean" itself received a nomination for "Best Sound Editing in Television Animation".

In his review for the DVD Verdict, Bryan Pope wrote that "the show's charm lies in the vast world of nautical nonsense" and that the show is "a world of aquanaut squirrels, clarinet-playing squids, underwater campfires, retired superheroes, plankton obsessed with world domination, and the most head-scratching family units I've ever come across (a crab and a puffer fish are parents to a teenage whale, while pint-sized Plankton is married to a no-nonsense computer named Karen)." Pope said that the season "remains the high point for the series" as it had produced "classic" episodes such as "No Weenies Allowed", "SpongeBob Meets the Strangler", and "Krusty Krab Training Video". However, Pope described "The Lost Episode" as a "misstep" that "veers too far away from Bikini Bottom and into unfunny live-action territory." Furthermore, various celebrities—including Justin Timberlake, Kelly Osbourne, Britney Spears, Bruce Willis, Noel Gallagher, rapper Dr. Dre, and Mike Myers—were reported to be fans of the show.

The popularity of SpongeBob translated well into merchandising. In 2002, SpongeBob SquarePants dolls sold at a rate of 75,000 per week, which was faster than Tickle Me Elmo dolls were selling at the time, and was also reported that various SpongeBob SquarePants merchandise sold "extremely well" in stores such as Hot Topic. SpongeBob has gained popularity in Japan, specifically with Japanese women. Nickelodeon's parent company Viacom purposefully targeted marketing at women in the country as a method of the SpongeBob SquarePants brand. Skeptics initially doubted that SpongeBob could be popular in Japan as the character's design is very different from already popular designs for Hello Kitty and Pikachu. The show's success in merchandising brought around $500 million in revenue.

Moreover, the gay community had embraced the show, according to BBC Online. The Wall Street Journal also raised questions about SpongeBob and Patrick in a recent article that pointed up the show's popularity in the gay community. Tom Kenny, in response to the article, said "[I] felt the insinuation was a stretch." Kenny said "I had heard that gay viewers enjoy the show in the same way that lots of people—college students, parents and children—like the show[...] I thought it was rather silly to hang an entire article on that. I don't think it's a case of it being a gay-friendly show—It's a human-being-friendly show. They're all welcome." Hillenburg responded about the character's sexual orientation and stated that he is "[a] cheerful character [but] is not gay." He clarified that he considers the character to be "almost asexual". The show's popularity among gay men would become controversial. In 2005, a promotional video, which showed SpongeBob along with other characters from children's shows singing together to promote diversity and tolerance, was attacked by an evangelical group in the United States because they saw SpongeBob being used as an "advocate for homosexuality". James Dobson of Focus on the Family accused the makers of the video of "promoting homosexuality due to a pro-tolerance group sponsoring the video". After Dobson made the comments, Hillenburg repeated this assertion that sexual preference was never considered during the creation of the show. Tom Kenny and other production members were shocked and surprised that such an issue had arisen. Dobson later asserted that his comments were taken out of context and that his original complaints were not with SpongeBob, the video, or any of the characters in the video but with the organization that sponsored the video, We Are Family Foundation. Dobson indicated that the We Are Family Foundation posted pro-homosexual material on their website, but later removed it.

== Episodes ==
The episodes are ordered below according to Nickelodeon's packaging order, and not their original production or broadcast order.

No. overall	No. in season	Title	Animation direction by	Written by	Original release date	Prod. code	U.S. viewers (millions)
41	1	"The Algae's Always Greener"	Frank Weiss	Written by : Aaron Springer, C.H. Greenblatt, and Merriwether Williams; Storyboarded by : Aaron Springer (director), C.H. Greenblatt	March 22, 2002	5572–188	4.55 2.64 (HH) (Note: (HH) denotes the amount of households that an episode was viewed in on premiere.)
41	1	"SpongeGuard on Duty"	Sean Dempsey	Written by : Jay Lender, Sam Henderson, and Mark O'Hare; Storyboarded by : Jay Lender & Sam Henderson (directors), Caleb Meurer	March 22, 2002	5572–187	4.55 2.64 (HH)
"The Algae's Always Greener": Plankton is still yearning for the Krabby Patty secret formula, so as a wish of him disliking his normal and dull life, he changes lives with Mr. Krabs. When he finds himself at the Krusty Krab as "Mr. Plankton", he has to constantly fulfill his tasks as the manager of the restaurant. Plankton soon discovers that Krabs's life has many disadvantages, including trying to run the Krusty Krab. "SpongeGuard on Duty": While at Goo Lagoon, SpongeBob wishes he was a lifeguard after seeing lifeguard Larry the Lobster adored by the beachgoers. Larry then offers to make SpongeBob a lifeguard, and SpongeBob becomes very popular in the beach. When Larry asks SpongeBob to take over for the day and leaves him, SpongeBob finds the hardships of being a lifeguard, especially since he can't swim.
42	2	"Club SpongeBob"	Andrew Overtoom	Written by : Walt Dohrn and Mark O'Hare; Storyboarded by : Walt Dohrn & Mark O'Hare (directors), Carson Kugler, William Reiss, & Erik Wiese	July 12, 2002 (Note: Club SpongeBob was first released on Sponge Buddies VHS and Nautical Nonsense and Sponge Buddies DVD on March 12, 2002.)	5572–192	2.52
42	2	"My Pretty Seahorse"	Tom Yasumi	Written by : Kent Osborne and Paul Tibbitt; Storyboarded by : Kent Osborne and Paul Tibbitt (directors), Carson Kugler, William Reiss, & Mike Roth	July 12, 2002	5572–193	2.52
"Club SpongeBob": SpongeBob and Patrick build a small treehouse, and an irritated Squidward wants to join after getting enraged by the two. When they all try to squeeze inside, the house gets launched deep into the Kelp Forest. SpongeBob and Patrick try to use a novelty toy, the "Magic Conch Shell" (voiced by Sirena Irwin), to find their way home. Squidward does not believe that the toy has special powers and tries to find a way out on his own. While Squidward fails every time, SpongeBob and Patrick are rewarded with a full buffet that falls out of a descending airplane. Squidward wants the food, but this fails every time when the conch refuses to allow Squidward to have the food. A park ranger comes and the gang believes they're saved, but Squidward is shocked when the ranger praises the same novelty toy. Squidward eventually gives in and praises the toy and waits for its advice to occur. "My Pretty Seahorse": While planting flowers on the first day of spring, SpongeBob finds and adopts a seahorse, and names her Mystery. They become close friends, and when Mystery follows him to work at the Krusty Krab, Mr. Krabs orders SpongeBob to get rid of his pet after causing trouble for the customers. Instead of sending her away, SpongeBob hides Mystery in a cupboard in the kitchen. Mystery still unintentionally causes trouble and after he tells them a story of his early life with a dollar, Mr. Krabs advises SpongeBob to release Mystery back into the wild. So with a sad, heavy heart, SpongeBob does just that. Squidward then shows SpongeBob and Mr. Krabs that Mystery ate out of the Krusty Krab's safe, causing the latter two to chase after her.
43	3	"Just One Bite"	Sean Dempsey	Written by : Jay Lender, Sam Henderson, and Merriwether Williams; Storyboarded by : Jay Lender & Sam Henderson (directors), Caleb Meurer	October 5, 2001	5572–194	2.92
43	3	"The Bully"	Frank Weiss	Written by : Aaron Springer, C.H. Greenblatt, and Merriwether Williams; Storyboarded by : Aaron Springer (director), C.H. Greenblatt	October 5, 2001	5572–191	2.92
"Just One Bite": When SpongeBob learns that Squidward has never tasted a Krabby Patty before, it becomes his obsession to get his co-worker to take even just one little bite, believing that it is the reason why he is "always so miserable". After several attempts of making him taste the sandwich, Squidward finally gives in and tries the patty. He pretends to hate it at first, but actually likes it. Squidward gets obsessed and desperate for more (despite SpongeBob's protests that Squidward should not eat too many Krabby Patties at one time), and as a result blows up after eating thousands of Krabby Patty sandwiches in a vault full of them. "The Bully": SpongeBob gets terrified when a new student named Flats the Flounder, who attends Mrs. Puff's Boating School, threatens to kick his butt. SpongeBob desperately seeks for help, but Flats eventually corners SpongeBob and beats him up. However, SpongeBob's resilient body absorbs the blows, and yet he remains unharmed. Flats continues to hit SpongeBob, until he finally faints from exhaustion before Mrs. Puff begins to beat SpongeBob up, having mistaken him for punching Flats since he had his clenched fist raised.
44	4	"Nasty Patty"	Tom Yasumi	Written by : Paul Tibbitt, Kaz, and Mark O'Hare; Storyboarded by : Paul Tibbitt & Kaz (directors), Carson Kugler, William Reiss, & Mike Roth	March 1, 2002	5572–195	3.91 2.65 (HH)
44	4	"Idiot Box"	Andrew Overtoom	Written by : Paul Tibbitt, Kent Osborne, and Merriwether Williams; Storyboarded by : Paul Tibbitt & Kent Osborne (directors), Carson Kugler, William Reiss, & Mike Roth	March 1, 2002	5572–178	3.91 2.65 (HH)
"Nasty Patty": A health inspector comes to the Krusty Krab unannounced. Mr. Krabs and SpongeBob have to give one of everything on the menu to the inspector so they can pass the inspection. After hearing a news report of a stranger passing himself off as a health inspector to obtain free food, Mr. Krabs believes that the inspector at the restaurant is the impostor. Mr. Krabs and SpongeBob formulate a "nasty patty" for the inspector and serve it to him. As SpongeBob and Mr. Krabs watch him suffer from the kitchen, another report comes and reveals that he is not the impostor. They believe that the patty killed him, and begin to panic. Mr. Krabs and SpongeBob decide to take the body and bury it, as two police officers investigate. "Idiot Box": SpongeBob and Patrick order a giant television just to play in its box. Squidward gets to have the television, and while he is watching it he hears noises and looks outside. Patrick and SpongeBob are found in the box playing with their imaginations. Squidward hears more noises and suspects they have something in the box that creates the noises. Squidward finally sneaks out at night and finds the true powers of his imagination.
45	5	"Mermaid Man and Barnacle Boy IV"	Sean Dempsey	Written by : Jay Lender, Sam Henderson, and Merriwether Williams; Storyboarded by : Jay Lender & Sam Henderson (directors), Caleb Meurer	January 21, 2002	5572–177	5.74 3.29 (HH)
45	5	"Doing Time"	Frank Weiss	Written by : Aaron Springer, C.H. Greenblatt, and Merriwether Williams; Storyboarded by : Aaron Springer (director), C.H. Greenblatt	January 21, 2002	5572–186	5.74 3.29 (HH)
"Mermaid Man and Barnacle Boy IV": Mermaid Man accidentally leaves his utility belt at the Krusty Krab. SpongeBob tries to return it to him, but they run off before he can. SpongeBob keeps the belt and gets into all kinds of mischief with it, accidentally shrinking all of Bikini Bottom starting with Squidward. "Doing Time": During a routine boating exam, SpongeBob gets into an accident at the Shady Shoals Rest Home. Mrs. Puff, being the driving instructor, is responsible for the accident and is taken into custody. In prison, Mrs. Puff starts to value her time at the Bikini Bottom Jail, being away from everyday complications in her life, including teaching at Mrs. Puff's Boating School, but gets afraid when a guilt-ridden SpongeBob, with the help of Patrick, tries to help her escape. Mrs. Puff, after being at the Bikini Bottom Jail for a short time, goes through repeated cycles of the accident and realizes all the events of this episode are possibly her imagination.
46	6	"Snowball Effect"	Andrew Overtoom	Written by : Paul Tibbitt, Kent Osborne, and Merriwether Williams; Storyboarded by : Paul Tibbitt & Kent Osborne (directors), Carson Kugler, William Reiss, & Mike Roth	February 22, 2002	5572–189	3.85 2.29 (HH)
46	6	"One Krabs Trash"	Tom Yasumi	Written by : Paul Tibbitt, Kent Osborne, and Mark O'Hare; Storyboarded by : Paul Tibbitt & Kaz (directors), Carson Kugler, William Reiss, & Mike Roth	February 22, 2002	5572–184	3.85 2.29 (HH)
"Snowball Effect": A snowstorm hits Bikini Bottom after a glacier settles above the city. For SpongeBob and Patrick, it means snowball fights. They go out in the snow and play, while Squidward complains about the racket. When SpongeBob and Patrick decide to have a snowball war, Squidward is dismayed when they call a truce, so he tries to restart the war. When demonstrating, he accidentally declares war on SpongeBob and Patrick, and takes it too far when building his fort. "One Krabs Trash": Mr. Krabs has a yard sale, and sells SpongeBob a drink hat for $10, only to then learn that it is a potentially priceless collector's item. Mr. Krabs tries to get the hat back from SpongeBob so he can get the fortune, but when he does, he then learns that it is actually worthless.
47	7	"As Seen on TV"	Frank Weiss	Written by : Aaron Springer, C.H. Greenblatt, and Merriwether Williams; Storyboarded by : Aaron Springer (director), C.H. Greenblatt	March 8, 2002	5572–172	3.65
47	7	"Can You Spare a Dime?"	Sean Dempsey	Written by : Jay Lender, Sam Henderson, and Merriwether Williams; Storyboarded by : Jay Lender & Sam Henderson (directors), Caleb Meurer	March 8, 2002	5572–190	3.65
"As Seen on TV": SpongeBob makes a very short cameo in the first Krusty Krab's commercial in which he is barely visible. SpongeBob lets his supposed fame go to his head when an elderly man recognizes him (mistaking him as a cereal box from another commercial). SpongeBob irritates the customers when he tries to entertain them, thinking he is now a celebrity. "Can You Spare a Dime?": Mr. Krabs loses his first dime earned and accuses Squidward of stealing it on the barest evidence. Squidward gets fed up with his employer's cheapness and insults, so he quits his job thinking he will find another one easily. He falls upon hardships and spends all his savings. He is forced to turn to SpongeBob, who he takes great advantage of. SpongeBob overtime gets tired of doing everything for Squidward and must get him his job back at the Krusty Krab. After eventually finding the dime (which turns out to be huge), Mr. Krabs rehires Squidward but then accuses him of misplacing his dime, again on the barest evidence. Having started another argument, SpongeBob puts on his maid uniform Squidward ordered him to wear before, anticipating the inevitable.
48	8	"No Weenies Allowed"	Andrew Overtoom	Written by : Paul Tibbitt, Kent Osborne, and Merriwether Williams; Storyboarded by : Paul Tibbitt & Kent Osborne (directors), Carson Kugler, Caleb Meurer, & William Reiss	March 15, 2002	5572–200	4.78 2.92 (HH)
48	8	"Squilliam Returns"	Sean Dempsey	Written by : Jay Lender, Sam Henderson, and Merriwether Williams; Storyboarded by : Jay Lender & Sam Henderson (directors), Heather Martinez & Mike Roth	March 15, 2002	5572–199	4.78 2.92 (HH)
"No Weenies Allowed": SpongeBob and Sandy come across the Salty Spitoon, the toughest club in the city, after a karate duel at the beach. Sandy makes it through the bouncer, but SpongeBob does not. He has to prove to the bouncer that he is tough enough. After several attempts, with help from Patrick, he gets inside, but injures himself after slipping on an ice cube. "Squilliam Returns": Squidward's rival, Squilliam Fancyson, has returned to torment Squidward on his failures since high school. Squidward lies and tells Squilliam that he actually owns a fine dining restaurant, which Squilliam asks to visit that night. Squidward frantically turns the Krusty Krab into a five-star restaurant after convincing Mr. Krabs to let him run it. However, things do not go well as Squidward planned. Squidward tells Spongebob to "empty his mind" of everything but fine dining. Spongebob delights Squilliam and his guests with superb service, but the plan goes awry when Squilliam asks SpongeBob his name, which he had cleared from his mind, and in panic ruins the restaurant.
49	9	"Krab Borg"	Tom Yasumi	Written by : Paul Tibbitt, Kent Osborne, and Mark O'Hare; Storyboarded by : Paul Tibbitt & Kent Osborne (directors), Carson Kugler, William Reiss, & Mike Roth	March 29, 2002	5572–197	4.58 2.65 (HH)
49	9	"Rock-a-Bye Bivalve"	Sean Dempsey	Written by : Jay Lender, Sam Henderson, and Mark O'Hare; Storyboarded by : Jay Lender & Sam Henderson (directors), Mike Roth	March 29, 2002	5572–203	4.58 2.65 (HH)
"Krab Borg": SpongeBob stays up late one night to watch a horror film, where robots take over the world. He becomes paranoid after the film and, at work, he thinks Mr. Krabs is actually a robot. He convinces Squidward to help him, and they soon think that robots really have taken over the world. SpongeBob and Squidward interrogate Mr. Krabs by tying him up, asking him questions, and destroying his appliances. "Rock-a-Bye Bivalve": Patrick and SpongeBob find an abandoned baby scallop, and they decide to adopt and pamper it. SpongeBob takes the role of a mother and Patrick as the father who goes to "work" all day. The two friends soon find that parenting is not easy.
50	10	"Wet Painters"	Frank Weiss	Written by : C.H. Greenblatt, Kaz, and Mark O'Hare; Storyboarded by : C.H. Greenblatt & Kaz (directors), Caleb Meurer & Carson Kugler	May 10, 2002	5572–202	3.86 2.60 (HH)
50	10	"Krusty Krab Training Video"	Frank Weiss	Written by : Aaron Springer, C.H. Greenblatt, Kent Osborne; Storyboarded by : Aaron Springer & C.H. Greenblatt (directors), Caleb Meurer	May 10, 2002	5572–198	3.86 2.60 (HH)
"Wet Painters": SpongeBob and Patrick are making a mess of things at the Krusty Krab, so Mr. Krabs decides to give them a task. He tells them to paint the living room of his house, but warns them the paint is permanent and threatens them should they get paint on anything but the wall. After successfully painting the room, they accidentally get paint all over Mr. Krabs' first earned dollar and must hide the evidence before Mr. Krabs returns home; otherwise, he will cut off their rear ends and attach them to plaques mounted over his fireplace. They fail to hide the evidence, but when Mr. Krabs comes back, he licks the dollar that SpongeBob and Patrick got paint all over, revealing that the paint actually comes off with saliva, and he only said it was permanent to mess with them for his own amusement. Mr. Krabs laughs out loud in the end, spraying his spit everywhere and melting the paint job that SpongeBob and Patrick did. "Krusty Krab Training Video": A "training video" of the Krusty Krab, demonstrating what an aspiring employee must do at work at the Krusty Krab, juxtaposed with Squidward, who is portrayed throughout as a less-than-ideal employee. The episode teases the Krabby Patty formula throughout, but cuts off at the end before the secret is revealed.
51	11	"Party Pooper Pants" "SpongeBob's House Party"	Andrew Overtoom	Written by : Paul Tibbitt, Kent Osborne, and Mark O'Hare; Merriwether Williams, Paul Tibbitt, Kent Osborne (Live Action); Storyboarded by : Paul Tibbitt & Kent Osborne (directors), Walt Dohrn(song sequence), Caleb Meurer, Carson Kugler, William Reiss, & Mike Roth	May 17, 2002	5572–204	6.32 3.88 (HH)
51	11	"Party Pooper Pants" "SpongeBob's House Party"	Andrew Overtoom	Written by : Paul Tibbitt, Kent Osborne, and Mark O'Hare; Merriwether Williams, Paul Tibbitt, Kent Osborne (Live Action); Storyboarded by : Paul Tibbitt & Kent Osborne (directors), Walt Dohrn(song sequence), Caleb Meurer, Carson Kugler, William Reiss, & Mike Roth	May 17, 2002	5572–205	6.32 3.88 (HH)
In Encino, California, Patchy the Pirate hosts a house party, where Potty keeps interfering with his plans and tries to get a band of fellow marionettes called the Bird Brains to perform. In the episode proper, SpongeBob gets a "plan-your-own-party" kit while grocery shopping. He decides to throw a party and invite everyone he knows in Bikini Bottom. Unfortunately for his guests, SpongeBob plans everything to a tight schedule, taking all the fun from his party. When he gets accidentally locked outside, the real party begins, but SpongeBob freaks out thinking that his plan is not being followed. He then gets arrested for not inviting the police officers to his party. In the morning, Patrick tells him the party was a success. Back in Encino, Potty tricks Patchy into playing a "flute", which turns out to be stick of dynamite that explodes, reducing Patchy to just a head while the Bird Brains perform.
52	12	"Chocolate with Nuts"	Andrew Overtoom	Written by : Paul Tibbitt, Kaz, Kent Osborne, and Merriwether Williams; Storyboarded by : Paul Tibbitt & Kaz (directors), Carson Kugler, William Reiss, & Mike Roth	June 1, 2002	5572–196	4.33 3.41 (HH)
52	12	"Mermaid Man and Barnacle Boy V"	Frank Weiss	Written by : C.H. Greenblatt, Kaz, and Merriwether Williams; Storyboarded by : C.H. Greenblatt & Kaz (directors), Mike Roth	June 1, 2002	5572–206	4.33 3.41 (HH)
"Chocolate with Nuts": After accidentally getting Squidward's Fancy Living Digest magazine in the mail, SpongeBob and Patrick want to live "fancy" as well. They decide to sell chocolate bars door-to-door to everyone in Bikini Bottom. Their chocolate bars become a success after they start "stretching the truth" about the chocolate's effects to sell more bars. "Mermaid Man and Barnacle Boy V": While at the Krusty Krab, the two superheroes of Bikini Bottom, Mermaid Man and Barnacle Boy, argue because Barnacle Boy feels he should not be considered a child sidekick anymore and, therefore, wants to eat an adult-sized Krabby Patty rather than a kid's meal. He wants to be called "Barnacle Man" and everyone (except SpongeBob) laughs at his protests, so he decides to go evil and teams up with Man Ray and the Dirty Bubble. They cause chaos all over Bikini Bottom, and Mermaid Man recruits SpongeBob, Patrick, Squidward and Sandy to dress in the superpower-granting costumes of four of his former superhero teammates to stop the villain trio. Although SpongeBob and friends accidentally defeat themselves in the ensuing battle, Mermaid Man reaches an armistice with Barnacle Boy, who returns to the good side while Man Ray and the Dirty Bubble get sent to jail.
53	13	"New Student Starfish"	Tom Yasumi	Written by : Paul Tibbitt, Kent Osborne, and Mark O'Hare; Storyboarded by : Paul Tibbitt & Kent Osborne (directors), Carson Kugler, Heather Martinez, William Reiss, & Mike Roth	September 20, 2002	5572–201	3.92 2.69 (HH)
53	13	"Clams"	Sean Dempsey	Written by : Jay Lender, Sam Henderson, and Mark O'Hare; Storyboarded by : Jay Lender & Sam Henderson (directors), Caleb Meurer	September 20, 2002	5572–207	3.92 2.69 (HH)
"New Student Starfish": Patrick accompanies SpongeBob to boating school. During class, however, Patrick accidentally frames SpongeBob for drawing a mean doodle of Mrs. Puff, causing SpongeBob to be moved to the back of the classroom and costing him one of his "good noodle" stars. SpongeBob blames Patrick for doing it on purpose, and they get in a fight in the halls and get after school detention. The two eventually bring their friendship back by saving the class science project, Roger (an egg), before Mrs. Puff congratulates them for the act. "Clams": Mr. Krabs earns his millionth dollar, and rewards SpongeBob and Squidward by taking them clam fishing for the weekend. Mr. Krabs loses his dollar after an overeager SpongeBob accidentally hooks it with his fishing line and throws it out into the water. A giant clam eats it and Mr. Krabs will not rest until he gets it returned, leaving his two employees stranded. Squidward tries to fool Krabs by giving him a regular dollar, but Krabs is insulted and uses him and SpongeBob as "bait" for the clam.
54	14	"Ugh" "SpongeBob BC"	Andrew Overtoom	Written by : Paul Tibbitt and Kent Osborne; Merriwether Williams (Live Action); Storyboarded by : Paul Tibbitt and Kent Osborne (directors), Carson Kugler, Caleb Meurer, & William Reiss	March 5, 2004	5572–208	5.96 4.11 (HH)
54	14	"Ugh" "SpongeBob BC"	Andrew Overtoom	Written by : Paul Tibbitt and Kent Osborne; Merriwether Williams (Live Action); Storyboarded by : Paul Tibbitt and Kent Osborne (directors), Carson Kugler, Caleb Meurer, & William Reiss	March 5, 2004	5572–220	5.96 4.11 (HH)
In prehistoric Encino, Patchy the Pirate presents an episode starring the cave-dwelling ancestors of SpongeBob, Patrick and Squidward—SpongeGar, Patar, and Squog (respectively)—discover fire after a lightning bolt strikes a piece of wood and sets it ablaze. They learn fire can be used to cook all sorts of food. After gorging themselves, a battle for who should control and keep the fire ensues. Another rainstorm causes the fire to be put out, but when lightning strikes Squog, SpongeGar and Patar discover he is hot enough for them to roast marshmallows.
55	15	"The Great Snail Race"	Andrew Overtoom	Written by : Paul Tibbitt, Kent Osborne, and Joe Liss (TV), Merriwether Williams (DVD); Storyboarded by : Paul Tibbitt and Kent Osborne (directors), Chuck Klein, Carson Kugler, Caleb Meurer, & William Reiss	January 24, 2003	5572–216	4.10 2.72 (HH)
55	15	"Mid-Life Crustacean"	Frank Weiss	Written by : C.H. Greenblatt, Kaz, and Mark O'Hare; Storyboarded by : C.H. Greenblatt & Kaz (directors), Chuck Klein	January 24, 2003	5572–210	4.10 2.72 (HH)
"The Great Snail Race": SpongeBob and Patrick discover that Squidward has ordered a female purebred racing snail named Snellie, whom he plans to enter in a snail race. After getting insulted by Squidward, SpongeBob becomes competitive and enters his own pet snail, Gary, coaching him to the point of exhaustion. At the race, Gary collapses, and Snellie comes to his aid. The two fall in love, while the race is won by Patrick's rock "pet", Rocky. "Mid-Life Crustacean": Mr. Krabs realizes that he is becoming old and has a midlife crisis. He overhears SpongeBob and Patrick hyping up a night out that they are planning, and figures that it would be a good way to feel hip and youthful again. Mr. Krabs gets to tag along with SpongeBob and Patrick.: Note: This episode is no longer rerunning on Nickelodeon as of 2018, and is also not available to watch on Paramount+, following a Standards and Practices review where it was determined some elements were not kid-appropriate. It is still available on home media releases, and pieces of the episode can be still seen ongoing on the Nickelodeon and SpongeBob SquarePants official YouTube channels.
56	16	"Born Again Krabs"	Tom Yasumi	Written by : Paul Tibbitt, Kent Osborne, and Merriwether Williams; Storyboarded by : Paul Tibbitt and Kent Osborne (directors), Chuck Klein, Carson Kugler, Caleb Meurer, & William Reiss	October 4, 2003 (Note: Both episodes was first released on Tales from the Deep DVD on January 28, 2003.)	5572–213	3.60
56	16	"I Had an Accident"	Frank Weiss	Written by : C.H. Greenblatt, Kaz, and Merriwether Williams; Storyboarded by : C.H. Greenblatt & Kaz (directors), Chuck Klein	October 4, 2003	5572–214	3.60
"Born Again Krabs": Mr. Krabs keeps a rotten Krabby Patty to save little money. To prove it is still good, Mr. Krabs tries it and ends up hospitalized for food poisoning. The Flying Dutchman visits Mr. Krabs in hospital and threatens to take his soul unless he changes his greedy ways. Things at first go well for Mr. Krabs as his employees and customers thank him for being more generous, but he takes spending to extremes and goes bankrupt, believing the entire experience to be a dream until SpongeBob informs him otherwise. Horrified and enraged, Mr. Krabs reverts to his old habits, but instead of taking his soul, the Dutchman gives him a choice between SpongeBob and 62 cents. Mr. Krabs takes the money and is overcome with regret moments later when Squidward calls him out for it. Finally, the Dutchman, annoyed by SpongeBob's rambling, returns him unharmed to Mr. Krabs. "I Had an Accident": SpongeBob shatters his buttocks in a sandboarding injury. He soon becomes paranoid of everything in Bikini Bottom and confines himself to his house with inanimate objects for friends. Sandy and Patrick repeatedly try to get him back outside, but find that they must resort to trickery to succeed. Patrick dresses as a gorilla, but someone who looks like him arrives and unmasks himself as a real gorilla that puts Patrick and Sandy in a bag, forcing SpongeBob to face his fears and rescue his friends. The gorilla rips him in half, and while he apologizes to Patrick and Sandy, he wonders what a gorilla is doing underwater, which causes the gorilla to panic and ride off into the sunset on a horse. A live-action family watching the episode turns off the television in confusion.
57	17	"Krabby Land"	Andrew Overtoom	Written by : Paul Tibbitt, Kent Osborne, and Mark O'Hare; Storyboarded by : Paul Tibbit & Kent Osborne (directors), Chuck Klein, Carson Kugler, Caleb Meurer, & William Reiss	April 3, 2004	5572–212	5.40 3.57 (HH)
57	17	"The Camping Episode"	Sean Dempsey	Written by : Jay Lender, Sam Henderson, and Merriwether Williams; Storyboarded by : Jay Lender & Dan Povenmire (directors), Caleb Meurer	April 3, 2004	5572–215	5.40 3.57 (HH)
"Krabby Land": Summer has arrived in Bikini Bottom, and Mr. Krabs attempts to attract children so he can earn their parents' money by building a child-friendly amusement park behind the Krusty Krab. The crustacean promises grand and exciting spectacles, along with a planned visit from the non-existent Krabby the Clown, but Mr. Krabs' greediness and lack of genuine effort stops anything of the sort from occurring. "The Camping Episode": SpongeBob and Patrick go camping in their yards. Annoyed, Squidward tells them to be quiet, but gets challenged and sets up camp with them. They stay up late at night, and Squidward continuously hits unlucky streaks, eventually being repeatedly attacked by a sea bear.
58	18	"Missing Identity"	Tom Yasumi	Written by : Paul Tibbitt, Kent Osborne, and Merriwether Williams; Storyboarded by : Paul Tibbitt and Kent Osborne (directors), Zeus Cervas, Carson Kugler, Caleb Meurer, & William Reiss	January 19, 2004	5572–209	5.66 4.07 (HH)
58	18	"Plankton's Army"	Sean Dempsey	Written by : Jay Lender, Sam Henderson, and Merriwether Williams; Storyboarded by : Jay Lender & Sam Henderson (directors), Caleb Meurer	January 19, 2004	5572–211	5.66 4.07 (HH)
"Missing Identity": On a rainy day in a diner, SpongeBob recounts a recent tale in which he lost his identity. It is revealed that SpongeBob wore his shirt backwards while his work nametag was on the frontside. "Plankton's Army": At the 25th anniversary of Plankton's first attempt to steal the Krabby Patty secret formula, the entire Krusty Krab crew becomes alert. Plankton decides to enlist the help of all of his relatives, whom he misremembers as evil geniuses like him but are actually rednecks. Plankton successfully steals the formula with his family's help, but is frightened after discovering the key ingredient: plankton themselves. This revelation causes Plankton and his family to flee in terror. However, Mr. Krabs admits the formula was a fake to trick Plankton and that the real formula is in a safe location, which Squidward correctly guesses is under Mr. Krabs' bedroom mattress at home.
59	19	"The Sponge Who Could Fly" "Lost Episode"	Andrew Overtoom and Tom Yasumi	Written by : Paul Tibbitt, Kent Osborne, and Merriwether Williams; Jay Lender and Sam Henderson (Live Action); Storyboarded by : Paul Tibbitt and Kent Osborne (directors), Carson Kugler, Caleb Meurer, & William Reiss	March 21, 2003 (Note: This episode was first released in The Sponge Who Can Fly VHS and Lost at Sea DVD on March 4, 2003.)	5572–217	7.64 4.33 (HH)
59	19	"The Sponge Who Could Fly" "Lost Episode"	Andrew Overtoom and Tom Yasumi	Written by : Paul Tibbitt, Kent Osborne, and Merriwether Williams; Jay Lender and Sam Henderson (Live Action); Storyboarded by : Paul Tibbitt and Kent Osborne (directors), Carson Kugler, Caleb Meurer, & William Reiss	March 21, 2003	5572–219	7.64 4.33 (HH)
Patchy the Pirate searches Encino for the lost episode of the series and, discovering the VCR tape buried "above the surface" at a playground, takes it home to watch it. While at the Jellyfish Fields, SpongeBob realizes that he wants to fly among with the jellyfish. He proceeds to come up with numerous ways to fly. While at home, his hair dryer inflates his trousers, giving him the ability to fly. He goes around helping people, earning their admiration and becoming a superhero of sorts. SpongeBob grows tired of helping people with their trivial needs that require little or no flight and attempts to fly with the jellyfish, but the townspeople chase after him. The chase ends when Old Man Jenkins (who's had a string of bad luck because of SpongeBob's flying adventures during the whole episode) launches from a cannon and hits SpongeBob, tearing up his pants. However, SpongeBob is flown home by the jellyfish, realizing that flying should be left to them. At home, he witnesses Patrick flying away naturally as a superhero would.
60	20	"SpongeBob Meets the Strangler"	Tom Yasumi	Written by : Paul Tibbitt, Kent Osborne, C.H. Greenblatt, and Merriwether Williams; Storyboarded by : Paul Tibbitt, Kaz, & C.H. Greenblatt (directors), Zeus Cervas, Chuck Klein, Carson Kugler, & Mike Roth	October 11, 2004 (Note: Both episodes was first released on The Seascape Capers VHS/DVD on January 6, 2004.)	5572–221	4.61 3.47 (HH)
60	20	"Pranks a Lot"	Andrew Overtoom	Written by : Paul Tibbitt, Kent Osborne, and Merriwether Williams; Storyboarded by : Paul Tibbitt and Kent Osborne (directors), Carson Kugler, Caleb Meurer, & William Reiss	October 11, 2004	5572–218	4.61 3.47 (HH)
"SpongeBob Meets the Strangler": SpongeBob catches a stranger littering and turns him in to the police, who explain he is the "Tattle-tale Strangler", a criminal who promises to strangle anyone who reports on him and his crimes. The Strangler escapes custody, so SpongeBob finds a bodyguard to protect him. The Strangler disguises himself as SpongeBob's bodyguard, all along seeking for a moment to strangle him. "Pranks a Lot": SpongeBob takes Patrick to his favorite prank store where they purchase the latest prank item, the "Invisible Spray". Using the spray, the two become invisible and go on a major pranking spree across Bikini Bottom, scaring everyone in town as ghosts. At the Krusty Krab, Mr. Krabs catches the duo out after they were about to burn Mr. Krabs' dollar, and the prank is on them.

== DVD release ==
The DVD boxset for season three was released by Paramount Home Entertainment and Nickelodeon in the United States and Canada on September 27, 2005, almost a year after the season had completed broadcast on television. The DVD release features bonus materials including the pilot episode "Help Wanted" and featurettes.

SpongeBob SquarePants: The Complete 3rd Season
Set details			Special features
20 episodes; 3-disc set; 1.33:1 aspect ratio; Languages: English, French and Spanish (Dolby Digital 2.0)			"Help Wanted"; Pop-Up Trivia Facts for "My Pretty Seahorse", "No Weenies Allowed", and "Krusty Krab Training Video"; How to Draw SpongeBob and Friends featurette
Release dates			"Help Wanted"; Pop-Up Trivia Facts for "My Pretty Seahorse", "No Weenies Allowed", and "Krusty Krab Training Video"; How to Draw SpongeBob and Friends featurette
Region 1	Region 2	Region 4	"Help Wanted"; Pop-Up Trivia Facts for "My Pretty Seahorse", "No Weenies Allowed", and "Krusty Krab Training Video"; How to Draw SpongeBob and Friends featurette
September 27, 2005	December 3, 2007	November 8, 2007	"Help Wanted"; Pop-Up Trivia Facts for "My Pretty Seahorse", "No Weenies Allowed", and "Krusty Krab Training Video"; How to Draw SpongeBob and Friends featurette
