= Chocolate with Nuts =

- SpongeBob SquarePants episode
- Title card
- Episode no.: Season 3 Episode 12a
- Directed by: Nick Jennings (art); Andrew Overtoom (animation); Paul Tibbitt (storyboard director); Kaz (storyboard director); Carson Kugler (storyboard artist); William Reiss (storyboard artist); Mike Roth (storyboard artist); Alan Smart (supervising director); Derek Drymon (creative director)
- Written by: Paul Tibbitt; Kaz; Kent Osborne; Merriwether Williams
- Production code: 5572-196
- Original air date: June 1, 2002
- Running time: 11 minutes

Episode chronology
← Previous "Party Pooper Pants"	Next → "Mermaid Man and Barnacle Boy V"
- SpongeBob SquarePants (season 3)

"Chocolate with Nuts" is the first half of the twelfth episode of the third season and the 52nd overall episode of the American animated television series SpongeBob SquarePants. It was written by the storyboard directors, Paul Tibbitt and Kaz, alongside Kent Osborne and Merriwether Williams with Andrew Overtoom as animation director and Carson Kugler, William Reiss and Mike Roth serving as storyboard artists. The segment was copyrighted in 2002 and aired on Nickelodeon in the United States on June 1 of that year. In this episode, SpongeBob and Patrick become entrepreneurs to make enough money to be able to live a fancy life.

The episode received universal acclaim from critics and fans and is considered one of the show's best episodes.

== Plot ==
The famous scene that shows a customer's exaggerated reaction while screaming "chocolate" before chasing SpongeBob and Patrick

SpongeBob accidentally receives Squidward's Fancy Living Digest magazine in the mail, inspiring him and Patrick to become entrepreneurs. At Patrick's suggestion, they become door-to-door chocolate bar salesmen. Their first customer repeatedly and maniacally screams "Chocolate!" at the pair and chases them. Successive attempts to sell also end in failure; one fish cons SpongeBob and Patrick into buying individual bar-carrying bags, then bags to carry those, while another loses patience after SpongeBob fails to provide a bar, which was lost in the bags.

After initially disastrous results, the two try using flattery. However, this is unsuccessful, ending in Patrick buying pictures of a customer as an overweight child, as is Patrick's attempt to focus, creeping out a potential customer. A billboard inspires them to "stretch the truth", which is successful when they convince elderly fish Mary and her even older mother, who has shriveled to an eyeless head and a spine, that it grants immortality. The lying continues, but they lose their profit after "helping" a seriously injured fish — who is, in reality, the same con artist from earlier — by buying his chocolate. The first customer catches up to SpongeBob and Patrick and reveals his sanity when he offers to buy all the chocolate they have. They use the money to rent out a fancy restaurant, allowing access only to themselves and their dates: Mary and her mother.

== Production ==
"Chocolate with Nuts" was written by Paul Tibbitt, Kaz, Kent Osborne and Merriwether Williams, with Andrew Overtoom serving as animation director. Tibbitt and Kaz also functioned as storyboard directors, and Carson Kugler, William Reiss and Mike Roth worked as storyboard artists. The episode was written in 2001 and originally aired on Nickelodeon in the United States on June 1, 2002, with a TV-Y parental rating.

"Chocolate with Nuts" was the last episode Kaz and Paul Tibbitt had written together along with "Nasty Patty".

== Release ==
"Chocolate with Nuts" was released on the DVD compilation called SpongeBob SquarePants: Christmas on September 30, 2003. The episode was also included in the SpongeBob SquarePants: The Complete 3rd Season DVD on September 27, 2005. On September 22, 2009, "Chocolate with Nuts" was released on the SpongeBob SquarePants: The First 100 Episodes DVD, alongside all the episodes of seasons one through five.

== Reception ==
"Chocolate with Nuts" has received universal acclaim from both critics and fans alike and is often cited as one of the show's best episodes. Jordan Moreau, Katcy Stephan and David Viramontes of Variety ranked "Chocolate with Nuts" as the fourth best SpongeBob SquarePants episode. Emily Estep of "WeGotThisCovered.com" rated the episode as the tenth best episode of the show, saying "The reason 'Chocolate with Nuts' is such a good episode is that it subtly and somewhat darkly hints at the concept of just how crazy the people who live around you are. SpongeBob and Patrick are mostly swindled into buying things from other people – actually, a single con man who keeps appearing – and nothing is more terrifying/hilarious than the man who simply starts screaming 'chocolate' repeatedly until SpongeBob and Patrick run away. 'Chocolate with Nuts' adds the complete absurdity of the program – like the old lady and her even older mother who remembers when 'they first invented chocolate. Sweet, sweet chocolate. I always hated it!' – and the aspects of SpongeBob's undersea life that mirror our own lives on land – like stranger danger."

SpongeBob's voice actor Tom Kenny considers this one of his favorite episodes. It was included in the iTunes collection "SpongeBob SquarePants: Tom Kenny's Top 20", where he called it "a very sick episode. You can spend hours theorizing about what these eleven minutes says [sic] about truth, lies, Big Business, entrepreneurship, and consumerism."
