= Mrs. Puff =

Character in the animated series SpongeBob SquarePants

- SpongeBob SquarePants character
- First appearance: "Boating School"; SpongeBob SquarePants; August 7, 1999
- Created by: Stephen Hillenburg
- Designed by: Stephen Hillenburg
- Voiced by: Mary Jo Catlett
- Portrayed by: Abby C. Smith (Broadway)

In-universe information
- Full name: Penelope Puff
- Species: Porcupine pufferfish (Note: Mrs. Puff has been called both a blowfish and a pufferfish in tie-in media.)
- Gender: Female
- Occupation: Driving teacher
- Spouse: Mr. Puff (deceased)
- Significant other: Mr. Krabs (boyfriend)
- Home: Bikini Bottom, Pacific Ocean

Mrs. Penelope Puff is a fictional character in Nickelodeon's animated television series SpongeBob SquarePants. She is voiced by Mary Jo Catlett and was created and designed by marine biologist and animator Stephen Hillenburg. She is an anthropomorphic pufferfish who works as SpongeBob's teacher at the town boating school.

Mrs. Puff was created in response to a request from Nickelodeon executives during the pitching process to put SpongeBob in a school. This conflicted with Hillenburg's vision for him to be an adult; he compromised by creating Mrs. Puff as a boat-driving teacher, and subsequently put him in a driving school, allowing the show to start production.

The character has received a positive critical reception and has become well known in popular culture for her distinctive voice and temperamental personality. In 2001, Mary Jo Catlett received an Annie Award nomination for her voice-over work as Mrs. Puff along with Tom Kenny as the title character, making them the first SpongeBob cast members to be nominated for an award. Mrs. Puff is featured regularly in a variety of merchandise, such as plush toys and video games, and has appeared at theme parks and in Toyota commercials.

== Development ==
=== Creation and design ===
Early drawings of Mrs. Puff by Stephen Hillenburg

Mrs. Puff was created and designed by Stephen Hillenburg. She was created after Hillenburg first pitched the idea for SpongeBob to Nickelodeon executives, who told Hillenburg to put SpongeBob in a school and make him a child. One executive told him that this was the network's "winning formula" at the time, citing one of their most recent shows Hey Arnold!. Hillenburg was prepared to "walk out" and abandon the project, because he wanted SpongeBob to be an adult, and writing him as a school-aged child conflicted with his creative vision. Hillenburg eventually came up with a compromise: he created Mrs. Puff as SpongeBob's boat-driving teacher. This satisfied Nickelodeon's request while keeping SpongeBob as an adult. Hillenburg in 2012 described this compromise as a "positive thing" that came out of the pitching process; in the SpongeBob BingePants podcast by Nickelodeon, the hosts explained that Mrs. Puff "saved" the show, stating "Stephen might not have done the show, if it had not been for Mrs. Puff and the boating school."

To convince Nickelodeon of the character idea, Hillenburg presented a three-panel comic that showed Mrs. Puff trying to teach SpongeBob how to drive a boat, only for him to crash into a rock. He chose to make Mrs. Puff a pufferfish, who inflates into a ball when SpongeBob crashes, to evoke the appearance of car airbags. Nickelodeon's executives enjoyed the comedy of the character and approved the addition; the series was later greenlit for production.

The June 2003 issue of Nickelodeon Magazine included a cover story that detailed the origins of SpongeBob. In an section called "The gang's all here...almost," the magazine explained that Mrs. Puff was the last main character added to the cast. She was added in the third draft of the show's pitch bible, after Nickelodeon had rejected the first two drafts.

=== Production history ===
According to Nickelodeon, one of the series' rules is that SpongeBob can never actually pass Mrs. Puff's class in order to keep Mrs. Puff as a main character in the series. In 2013, Nickelodeon released a document detailing the show's guidelines, which included the rule: "SpongeBob can never permanently receive his boating license (this way, Mrs. Puff remains a key character in his world). To SpongeBob, failing his boating test yet again just means he gets to spend another year in his favorite teacher's classroom." Due to this rule, SpongeBob's license is always revoked or destroyed in some way before an episode ends.

Animation historian Jerry Beck noted that Mrs. Puff was one of the earliest characters on SpongeBob to lead entire episodes told from her perspective, rather than SpongeBob's. These included season two's "No Free Rides," in which Mrs. Puff steals SpongeBob’s boat, and season three's "Doing Time," which centers on Mrs. Puff dreaming about being sent to jail. Beck observed that only four characters (SpongeBob, Mrs. Puff, Squidward, and Mr. Krabs) were given these "point-of-view starring role" episodes so early on in the series. Other characters in the first few seasons, such as Sandy and Patrick, mostly co-starred in stories told from SpongeBob's perspective.

=== Voice ===
Mrs. Puff is voiced by American actress Mary Jo Catlett, who is known for her live-action roles on television programs from the 1970s such as Diff'rent Strokes and M*A*S*H. As of 2025, voicing Mrs. Puff is Catlett's only regular television role. Catlett described herself as "basically retired" in 2013, since she is good friends with the other SpongeBob cast members, making the SpongeBob recording booth an easy environment that requires less preparation than in-person performances. The About Group's Nancy Basille noted in 2016 that Catlett's "rich, low tones as teacher Mrs. Puff recall other roles she has had," citing Diff'rent Strokes and M*A*S*H as programs where she used a similar voice.

== Role in SpongeBob SquarePants ==
Mrs. Puff is a porcupine pufferfish who wears a blue sailor-style cap and a matching sailor's uniform. She displays the pufferfish's inflation defense mechanism whenever she is scared or when SpongeBob crashes, akin to a car's airbag deploying. Despite the series' underwater setting, she is notably the only main character who is a fish; this fact was highlighted as part of the "SpongeBob Trivia" activity printed on boxes of Kraft's SpongeBob macaroni and cheese.

Mrs. Puff owns the underwater boating school that SpongeBob attends. She would like nothing more than to pass SpongeBob, as he is her most dedicated student, but he routinely fails every driving test he takes. He often accidentally crashes Mrs. Puff's boat, leading to mass destruction and unintentionally endangering Mrs. Puff.

A running gag in the series is Mrs. Puff's extensive criminal record. As a result of SpongeBob's reckless driving, he regularly lands Mrs. Puff in jail since she assumes responsibility for his actions. This gag is introduced in "Hall Monitor", when Mrs. Puff is held responsible after SpongeBob inadvertently destroys Bikini Bottom. In "Doing Time", SpongeBob and Patrick attempt to break her out of prison to no avail. It is revealed that she prefers prison to working as a teacher because she does not have to drive with SpongeBob. A few episodes also imply she has a dark past in which this criminal history extends beyond antics with SpongeBob; in "No Free Rides", it is implied that Mrs. Puff once had to move to a new town and start a new school with a new name. In "Lighthouse Louie", an old newspaper is very briefly seen which reads “DERANGED BOAT TEACHER MAKES GETAWAY: Distracts authorities with balloon animals” (referencing an otherwise non-sequitur moment in "No Free Rides" in which she makes a balloon animal before stealing SpongeBob's newfound boat).

Mrs. Puff's friendliness toward other characters varies. She sympathizes with the short-tempered Squidward Tentacles, and considers him to be the prime example of an outstandingly good driver. Mrs. Puff also treats Patrick, who has attended her class multiple times, with respect despite his slow-wittedness. Of all the residents of Bikini Bottom, she is closest to SpongeBob. While she normally dreads having to drive with SpongeBob, she often acts as a motherly figure towards him.

Mrs. Puff was married to another pufferfish named Mr. Puff in the past, but he was captured by humans and turned into a novelty lamp – SpongeBob tells Mr. Krabs that Mrs. Puff does not like to talk about the loss of her husband. Since then, she and Mr. Krabs have pursued a romantic relationship and gone on many dates together. As of the show's tenth season, Mrs. Puff and Mr. Krabs had been dating on-and-off for sixteen years. Mr. Krabs' love for her is so strong that it can transcend his greed for money. She is one of only two characters, the other being his daughter Pearl, that he cares for more than his riches. He gives her a variety of pet names in the series and in spin-off media. In his review of the third season, Bryan Pope of DVD Verdict examined the two characters' relationship and mistook Mrs. Puff for Krabs' wife.

== Reception ==
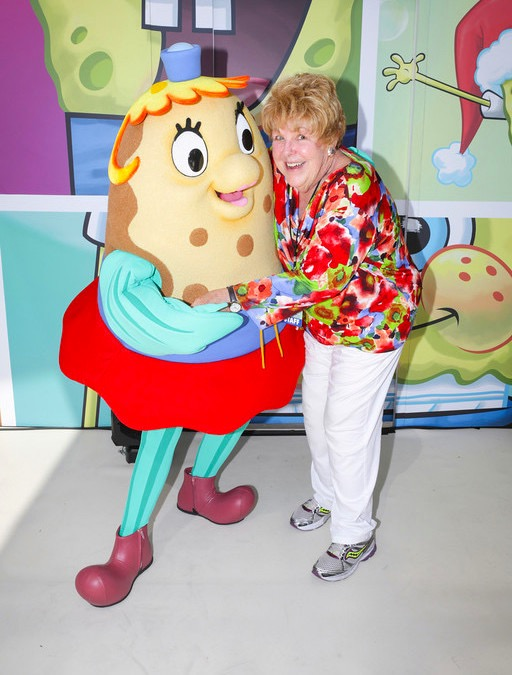
Actress Mary Jo Catlett (right) is the voice of Mrs. Puff.

The character has received positive reactions from critics and fans. Yahoo! News called Mrs. Puff "the most famous driving teacher on the planet." Fashion designer Peter Jensen, who designed a line of sweatshirts inspired by SpongeBob, called Mrs. Puff his "absolute favorite" character in an interview with Women's Wear Daily. In 2004, New York Times chief film critic A. O. Scott named Mrs. Puff as one of his favorite characters on SpongeBob SquarePants, along with Squidward Tentacles and Sandy Cheeks. Mrs. Puff was ranked second on Chilango's list of favorite cartoon teachers. KSL-TV listed Mrs. Puff in their countdown of "13 teachers from pop culture you can't help but love". Andrew Whalen of IBT Media called Mrs. Puff's role in the "Doing Time" episode "a series highlight". The Pittsburgh Post-Gazette reported in 2002 that episodes about Mrs. Puff's Boating School were fan favorites. Scott Lecter of DVD Talk said that Mrs. Puff, Sandy and Squidward "make for some of the biggest laughs in the episodes".

Francis Rizzo of DVD Talk called Mrs. Puff's voice "spot-on" thanks to "the perfectly cast Mary Jo Catlett". Catlett's voice-over work as Mrs. Puff was nominated for a 2001 Annie Award in the category Outstanding Individual Achievement for Voice Acting by a Female Performer in an Animated Television Production. Tom Kenny was nominated at the same ceremony for voicing SpongeBob, making them the first actors to earn an award nomination for their work on the show. Catlett and some other main cast members were also nominated for Best Vocal Ensemble at the 2013 Behind the Voice Actors Awards.

During the controversy surrounding SpongeBob's sexuality, Mrs. Puff's name began to be criticized for supposedly referring to the slang term "puff," a descriptor of gay men that can be derogatory or affectionate. The BBC first noted this in reports of the controversy in 2002 and again in 2004. In a 2005 issue of the Sarasota Herald-Tribune, columnist David Grimes challenged this interpretation, writing, "I do not consider [Mrs. Puff's name] damaging evidence. However, if SpongeBob were receiving lessons from Mr. Puff, that would be an entirely different matter." K. Sobschak of the St. Catharines Standard also denounced the debate, asking, "What is wrong with taking boating lessons from a fish? This is a comedy for kids." The National Expert Commission of Ukraine on the Protection of Public Morality revived the criticism of Mrs. Puff's name in 2012, citing it as one of the reasons for an attempted nationwide ban of the program. Mediaite Editor-in-Chief Andrew Kirell questioned this decision, asking rhetorically, "What's so offensive there? Well, 'puff' is a term often used to describe a gay man, as if Ukrainian children knew that."

Mrs. Puff's quotes and voice have also become popular with fans and casual viewers. The Sun writer Esther Cepeda humorously referred to Mrs. Puff's catchphrase "Oh, SpongeBob!" as "immortal words" in a 2011 article. Her quote "Oh, Neptune" became part of an Internet meme in 2016. Various memes covered by the comedy websites Smosh and BuzzFeed have featured other quotes from the character. In an interview with San Diego Gay & Lesbian News, the cast of Surprise Surprise (which starred Catlett) mentioned that "not one cast or crew person on the movie let a day [on the set] go by without calling some relative ... and handing their cell phones to Mary Jo [Catlett] to do her best 'Oh noooooooo, SpongeBob, nooooooooooo!'"

== In other media ==
A float featuring Mrs. Puff at Sea World in Southport, Queensland

Mrs. Puff has appeared in many types of SpongeBob SquarePants merchandise, including action figures, aquarium ornaments, and video games. Tie-in books have prominently featured the character. Board games based on the show, such as The Game of Life and Bikini Bottom Book of Games, use her schoolhouse as a playing location. In 2007, a Lego construction set based on Mrs. Puff's school was released. SpongeBob's Boating Bash, a 2010 racing video game, centers on Mrs. Puff and takes place at the boating school. Mrs. Puff is a playable character in the Wii version, and acts as a guide for the player in the Nintendo DS game.

Theme parks and events have featured Mrs. Puff, often as a costumed character. She was included on a boating school float as part of Sea World Australia's SpongeBob ParadePants parade, which opened in December 2011. She appeared at Universal Studios Hollywood's "SpongeBob Fan Shellabration" in 2013, and at the 2015 SpongeBob SquarePants 400 in Kansas City. Mrs. Puff also made regular appearances at Nickelodeon Suites Resort and Nickelodeon Universe with Mr. Krabs. In 2026, a ride called Mrs. Puff's Boating School opened at the Universal Kids Resort, featuring a Mrs. Puff statue.

In 2011, Mary Jo Catlett provided the voice-over for a road traffic safety commercial hosted by Mrs. Puff. It was produced by Nickelodeon and Toyota as the first in a series of SpongeBob advertisements from the two companies. The 30-second infomercial incorporated clips from the fifth-season episode "Boat Smarts" along with new content. Catlett also sings a track as Mrs. Puff on The Best Day Ever album, titled "Mrs. Puff's Boating School Ad". It was released on September 12, 2006, by Nick Records. Rita Engelmann, who voices Mrs. Puff in the German dub of SpongeBob SquarePants, recorded a single as her character titled "Hinterher! (feat. Mrs. Puff)". The song is a parody of Icona Pop's "I Love It" and was released in 2014 by Sony Music Entertainment. Mrs. Puff is mentioned in the book Shingaling, a 2015 sequel to Wonder.

Mrs. Puff plays a small role in the 2004 film The SpongeBob SquarePants Movie and its 2015 sequel. Her lack of screen time in both movies was criticized. Jessica Walsh of the Reading Eagle felt that the first film was "missing something, since key characters, such as Sandy the Squirrel and Mrs. Puff, make only cameo appearances". Sandie Chen of Common Sense Media wrote that the decision to relegate characters like Mrs. Puff to small roles "won't go over well with some fans". About.com's Nancy Basille considered this the first movie's biggest flaw and asked, "why didn't they use more of Squidward, Mr. Krabs, Gary, Mrs. Puff and all our other favorite secondary characters?" The novelization of the 2004 movie includes additional scenes starring Mrs. Puff and Squidward that were not in the motion picture. Mrs. Puff appears in the 2009 stage adaptation of "The Sponge Who Could Fly", which debuted at the Liverpool Empire Theatre. The 2016 musical based on the series stars Abby C. Smith as Mrs. Puff.

SpongeBob's inability to pass Mrs. Puff's course has been referenced in popular culture. In 2011, ice hockey player Taylor Hall failed his driving test and likened it to SpongeBob's situation at Mrs. Puff's school. The writers of Engadget compared a remote-controlled, underwater camera to the boats in SpongeBob, remarking that Mrs. Puff should call her insurance agent if users channel their "inner SpongeBob while remotely driving the thing". In a satirical 2011 article, writers at The Washington Post pretended to interview SpongeBob about his trouble graduating from Mrs. Puff's boating school.
