= Citizen Dog (comic strip) =

American comic strip by Mark O'Hare

- Author: Mark O'Hare
- Website: www.gocomics.com/citizendog (reruns)
- Current status/schedule: Concluded
- Launch date: May 15, 1995
- End date: May 26, 2001
- Syndicate(s): Universal Press Syndicate
- Publisher: Andrews McMeel Publishing
- Genre: Humor

Citizen Dog was a newspaper comic strip by Mark O'Hare, distributed by Universal Press Syndicate.

== Publication history ==
Originally pitched as Spot, O'Hare's idea was to do an odd couple comedy. Printed nationally from 1995, Citizen Dog ended on May 26, 2001. O'Hare decided to stop the comic because he felt he was not able to put in the work that the comic deserved, but noted he would be willing to bring it back if given the chance. Daily reruns of the strip resumed on June 28, 2008, on GoComics.

== Characters and story ==
The strip is focused on the antics of a human male, Mel, and his male canine companion, Fergus. The lines between master and companion are extremely blurred: Fergus frequently asserts his rights as equal, or perhaps superior, partner in the friendship. In an early strip, Mel labors for three panels to install a pet door, only to have Fergus stroll in via the doorknob. Of course, this works both ways; several strips later, Mel flounders with his order at a fancy restaurant, only to be saved by Fergus, who orders for both of them in fluent French. All in all, Mel and Fergus's friendship is similar to that of the title characters in Calvin and Hobbes, sharing both adventures and frequent arguments about the silliest topics.

Animals in Citizen Dog can talk, and most of them (particularly dogs and cats) walk upright, chatting with each other and their owners. Furthermore, many dogs look similar to their owners: a slender, bookish man may find his eyewear paralleled on his dachshund. Almost all characters feature O'Hare's distinctive large nose and candy corn-shaped body, even the women—with the sole exception of occasional nubile females, who are rendered with large bosoms and caricatured hourglass figures.

- Mel – The primary human in the series, completely average and unremarkable in every way. He is "suburbia" incarnate, often content to sit and watch TV for long hours at a time and working a middle-class desk job for an undistinguished company. He has an unusually large nose, likened at one point to a casaba melon, and rarely ever attracts attention from the opposite gender.
- Fergus – Mel's dog who is arguably the more intelligent of the two, although this also leads to a massive ego. He and the other canines of the strip make frequent observations about the state of affairs in human society and how silly it is. Technology alternates between boring and scaring him.
- Arlo – Another dog and Fergus's best friend, rarely ever seen on his own, so it can be said that he is strictly a follower and "yes-man" for Fergus.
- Cuddles – The voice of reason in a dog's world, Cuddles is a cat who enjoys fine dining and reading Jane Austen novels. He frequently gets fed up with Fergus's unenthusiastic attitude to life, and has a well-known hatred of winter ("SAY NO 2 SNO!" is written on a button he tries to give to various people). Often uses baby-talk when conversing with his owner, an unnamed little old lady.
- Bruno – A large, strong sheepdog who never speaks and is often depicted as being rather scruffy. He harbors a friendship with Cuddles which would be considered highly out-of-place by "regular" people, but is accepted as normal in the comic when others see him with the unfortunate cat hugged up under his armpit.
- Mario – A fish who Mel often spends time trying to catch in later strips, but who he usually ends up discussing current events with. Almost landed a part in Free Willy, but was denied the role for being a trout.
- Maggie – A dark-haired little girl who Fergus and Arlo follow to and from school, amusing them with her tales of what she has to study in elementary school. She dislikes this attention intensely, especially after Fergus accidentally eats her homework on one occasion.

== Collections ==
Three paperback compilations were released:

- Citizen Dog, ISBN 0-8362-5186-5
- Dog's Best Friend, ISBN 0-8362-6751-6
- D is for Dog, ISBN 0-7407-0457-5
