= Derek Drymon =

American cartoonist

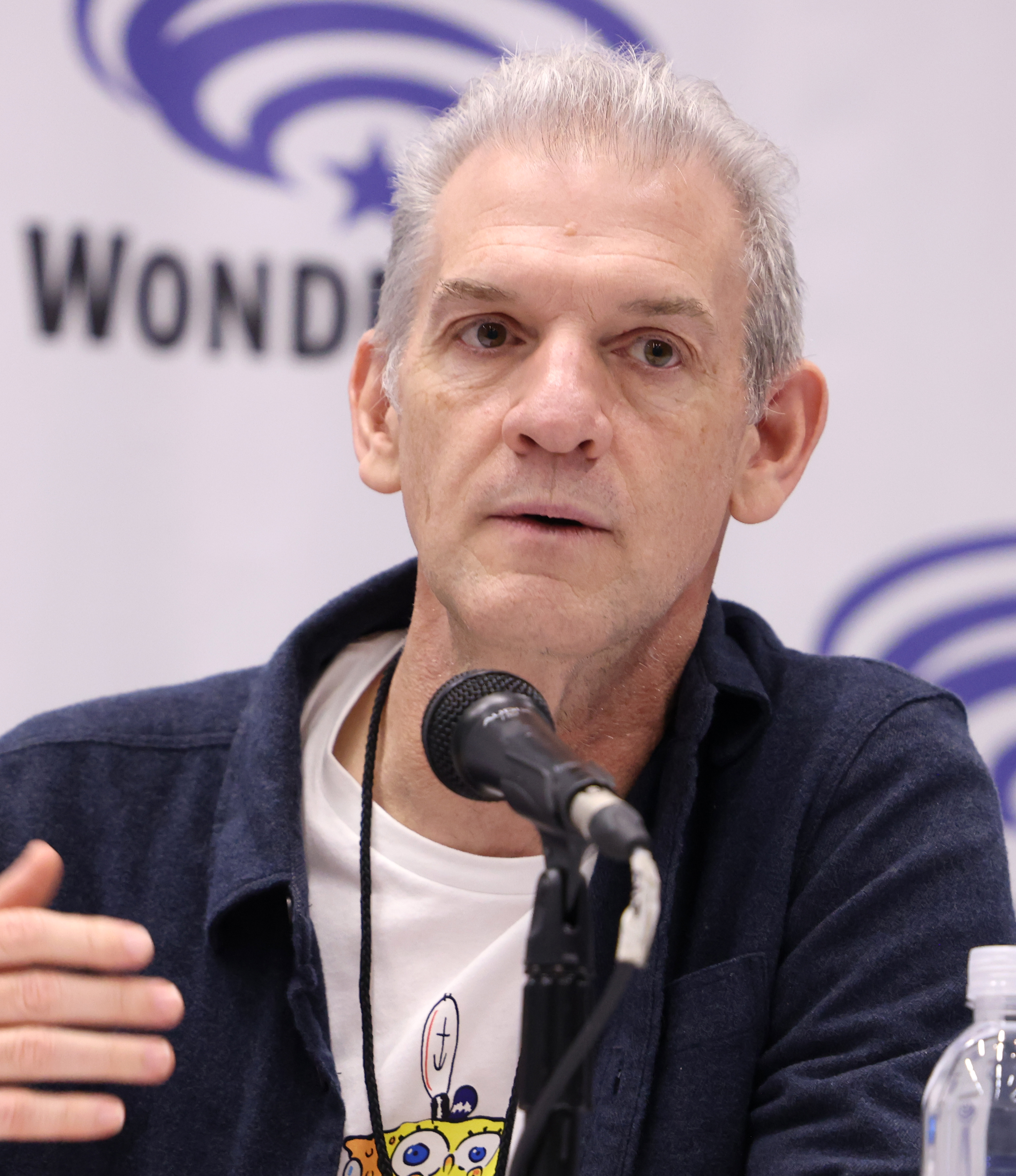
- Drymon in 2026
- Born: Morristown, New Jersey, U.S.
- Education: School of Visual Arts
- Occupations: Comedian; animator; cartoonist; writer; storyboard artist; director; producer; composer; voice actor
- Years active: 1986–present
- Known for: Rocko's Modern Life; SpongeBob SquarePants; Adventure Time; CatDog

Derek Drymon is an American animator, writer, storyboard artist, director, comedian, and producer. He has worked on numerous animated cartoon productions.

== Early life ==
Derek Drymon was born in New Jersey. He attended Jefferson Township and Dover public schools as a child and enjoyed drawing and making comic books. Drymon graduated from Jefferson Township High School in 1987. Drymon attended the School of Visual Arts (SVA) in New York, where he majored in Illustration, sharpening his drawing skills and moving from still images to animation. He graduated from SVA in 1992.

== Career ==
Drymon obtained an internship with Disney on the strength of his life drawings.

Drymon was discovered by Nickelodeon in 1992. He moved to California to work as an animator for Nickelodeon. In 1994, Drymon also began working as a storyboard artist and writer for Rocko's Modern Life. It was here he met five of his future employers, Chris Savino, Tim Hill, Mark O'Hare, Nick Jennings, and Stephen Hillenburg; Hill was a writer, Hillenburg was a co-producer and storyboard artist. In 1996, Hillenburg created SpongeBob SquarePants. Drymon performed many duties on SpongeBob SquarePants, including being a writer on all episodes, the creative director, and, on his last season with the show, supervising producer. Drymon also worked on the Cartoon Network animated series Camp Lazlo. Drymon worked on Tim Hill's side project, the popular KaBlam! skit Action League Now!, as a storyboard artist. He also wrote the Emmy Award-nominated episode of CatDog "Doggone".

Drymon met Stephen Hillenburg on the Nickelodeon cartoon Rocko's Modern Life. Hillenburg recalled Drymon as "one of the main people in the genesis of SpongeBob". Drymon teamed up with Hillenburg, Hill, and Nick Jennings who was also a companion from Nickelodeon. Drymon was the creative director for the first three seasons and became the supervising producer in season 3 until being replaced by Paul Tibbitt as the supervising producer and Vincent Waller as the creative director starting in season 4. Along with Stephen Hillenburg, Drymon approved the writers' ideas and outlines for episodes and controlled the creative and production process on SpongeBob.

Drymon was eventually promoted to executive producer on Adventure Time, and become a lead writer and director for DreamWorks Animation, Illumination Entertainment, Sony Pictures Animation and Rovio Animation. During the first three seasons of SpongeBob, Drymon being creative director allowed him to work with executive story editor Merriwether Williams and the rest of the writing team.

Staff writer Kent Osborne responded to the writing process with Drymon and other writers by saying "By the third season we had done 26 half-hours. I came up with millions of ideas". Despite the issues with writing new episodes, Drymon collaborated with the writers to create episode ideas like the half-hour specials and episodes that focused on other characters, for example the season three episodes "The Algae Always Greener" and "Plankton's Army" focused on Sheldon Plankton and "Doing Time" focused on Mrs. Puff. Drymon said in an interview "Coming up with episode ideas was always tough". The writers were influenced for the episode "The Secret Box", which was influenced by Drymon because he told them when he was younger he kept a "secret box", the writers thought it was hilarious and weird and used Drymon's idea to create the story of the episode. Drymon co-wrote the pilot episode "Help Wanted". Drymon earned two Emmy nominations and along with the crew of SpongeBob won the "Best Animated Television Production" Annie award in 2005 for season 3 of SpongeBob.

Drymon hired a large amount of the staff writers, including Sam Henderson, a friend and fellow alumnus of SVA, along with Kent Osborne and Walt Dohrn.

From 2008 to 2017, Drymon worked as a storyboard artist for DreamWorks Animation, working on films such as the Kung Fu Panda trilogy, Monsters vs. Aliens, Shrek Forever After, Puss in Boots, Turbo, Penguins of Madagascar, and Captain Underpants: The First Epic Movie.

Drymon was an executive producer (with Fred Seibert) on the Cartoon Network series Adventure Time, created by Pendleton Ward for the show's first season. He was no longer credited on episodes starting with the second season.

On September 17, 2020, Drymon was set to co-direct Hotel Transylvania: Transformania with story artist Jennifer Kluska.

In April 2023, Drymon was announced as the director of the fourth SpongeBob SquarePants theatrical film titled The SpongeBob Movie: Search for SquarePants.

== Filmography ==
=== Television ===
Year	Title	Notes
1993–1996	Rocko's Modern Life	assistant storyboard artist (season 1–3) / additional writer (season 4) / assistant director & storyboard artist (season 4)
1996–1997	Hey Arnold!	storyboard artist / director
1996–2000	KaBlam!	storyboard artist (Action League Now!)
1998	CatDog	storyboard director / storyboard artist / storyboard supervisor / writer
1999–2004	SpongeBob SquarePants	creative director (seasons 1–3) / writer (seasons 1–3) / storyboard artist ("Help Wanted") / supervising producer (season 3)
2007	Diggs Tailwagger	creator / director / writer / executive producer (pilot)
2008	Camp Lazlo	writer / storyboard director ("Samson Needs a Hug" episode)
2010	The Cartoonstitute	creator / writer (“Danger Planet” and “Stockboys of the Apocalypse” pilots)
2010	Adventure Time	executive producer (season 1)
2017	Billy Dilley's Super-Duper Subterranean Summer	writer ("Crab Hands" episode)

=== Film ===
Year	Title	Role	Notes
2003	My Life with Morrissey	Bad Comedian	
2004	The SpongeBob SquarePants Movie	The Screamer / Fisherman	writer / storyboard artist / executive producer / sequence director co-written with Tim Hill, Stephen Hillenburg, Kent Osborne, Aaron Springer and Paul Tibbitt
2008	Kung Fu Panda		additional storyboard artist
2009	Monsters vs. Aliens		additional story artist
2010	Shrek Forever After		story artist
2010	Megamind		special thanks
2011	Hop		storyboard artist
2011	Kung Fu Panda 2		additional story artist
2011	Puss in Boots		additional story artist
2011	Night of the Living Carrots		storyboard artist
2013	Turbo	Worker Snail #2/FAST Network Trackside Reporter	story artist
2014	Penguins of Madagascar		head of story
2015	The SpongeBob Movie: Sponge Out of Water		writer, "Squeeze Me"
2016	Kung Fu Panda 3		story artist
2017	Captain Underpants: The First Epic Movie		storyboard artist
2019	Santa's Little Helpers (Minion Mini–Movie)		director
2021	Monster Pets	Tinkles / Zombie / Gillmen	director
2022	Hotel Transylvania: Transformania	Human Zombie (Cameo)	director co-directed with Jennifer Kluska
2025	The SpongeBob Movie: Search for SquarePants		director / story artist

== Bibliography ==
Month	Title	Issue	Story	Publisher	Notes
Apr. 2011	SpongeBob Comics	No. 2	"Picture This!"	United Plankton Pictures	Story
Jun. 2011	SpongeBob Comics	No. 3	"Squidward and the Golden Clarinet"	United Plankton Pictures	Story
Oct. 2011	SpongeBob Comics	No. 5	"Day Off / Off Day"	United Plankton Pictures	Story
Aug. 2012	SpongeBob Comics	No. 11	"Dear Diary"	United Plankton Pictures	Story
Oct. 2012	SpongeBob Comics	No. 13	"Drawn In" and "The Curse of the Flying Dutchman"	United Plankton Pictures	Story
Nov. 2012	SpongeBob Comics	No. 14	"For the Love of Chum"	United Plankton Pictures	Story
Dec. 2012	SpongeBob Comics	No. 15	"Connect the Dots"	United Plankton Pictures	Story
Jan. 2013	SpongeBob Comics	No. 16	"The Treasure of Captain Goldfish"	United Plankton Pictures	Story
Apr. 2013	SpongeBob Comics	No. 19	"Morning Melody"	United Plankton Pictures	Story
May 2013	SpongeBob Comics	No. 20	"Sponge Monkey"	United Plankton Pictures	Story
Oct. 2013	SpongeBob Comics	No. 25	"The Dutchman's Challenge"	United Plankton Pictures	Story
Jan. 2014	SpongeBob Comics	No. 28	"Curse of the King Krabbe"	United Plankton Pictures	Story
Jan. 2014	SpongeBob Comics	No. 28	"My Life as a Crossing Guard"	United Plankton Pictures	Story
Feb. 2014	SpongeBob Comics	No. 29	"Scaredy Snail"	United Plankton Pictures	Story
May 2014	SpongeBob Comics	No. 32	"Showdown at the Shady Shoals: Part 1"	United Plankton Pictures	Story
Jun. 2014	SpongeBob Comics	No. 33	"Showdown at the Shady Shoals: Part 2"	United Plankton Pictures	Story
Jul. 2014	SpongeBob Comics	No. 34	"Showdown at the Shady Shoals: Part 3"	United Plankton Pictures	Story
Aug. 2014	SpongeBob Comics	No. 35	"Showdown at the Shady Shoals: Part 4"	United Plankton Pictures	Story
Sept. 2014	SpongeBob Comics	No. 36	"Showdown at the Shady Shoals: Part 5"	United Plankton Pictures	Story
Oct. 2014	SpongeBob Comics	No. 37	"Dreams of the Dreaming Dreamer"	United Plankton Pictures	Story
Feb. 2015	SpongeBob Comics	No. 41	"Star of the Show" and "Snow Job"	United Plankton Pictures	Story
Apr. 2015	SpongeBob Comics	No. 43	"Fry Cook 2.0"	United Plankton Pictures	Story
Jun. 2015	SpongeBob Comics	No. 45	"Patrick's Itch"	United Plankton Pictures	Story
Oct. 2015	SpongeBob Comics	No. 49	"Patty Thing!"	United Plankton Pictures	Story
Nov. 2015	SpongeBob Comics	No. 50	"Mash-Up Pants"	United Plankton Pictures	Story
Apr. 2016	SpongeBob Comics	No. 55	"The Ballad of Barnacle Bill: Part 1"	United Plankton Pictures	Story
May 2016	SpongeBob Comics	No. 56	"The Ballad of Barnacle Bill: Part 2"	United Plankton Pictures	Story
Jun. 2016	SpongeBob Comics	No. 57	"On the Lam"	United Plankton Pictures	Story
