= Mary Jo Catlett =

American actress (born 1938)

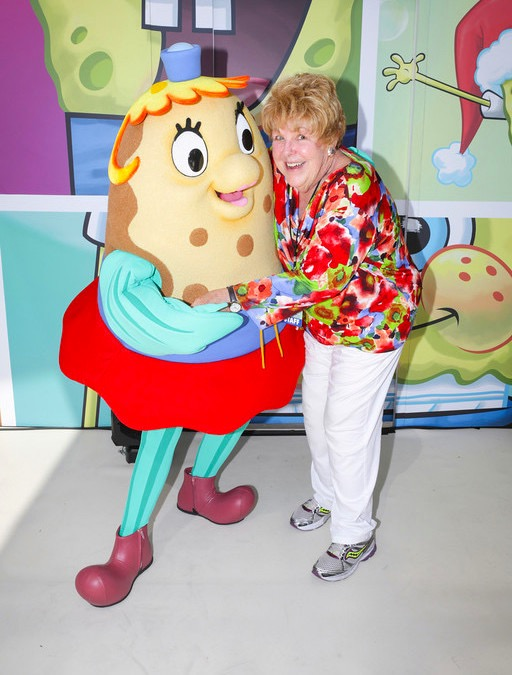
- Catlett with her character, Mrs. Puff in 2013
- Born: September 2, 1938 (age 88); Denver, Colorado, U.S.
- Other name: Mary Catlett
- Occupations: Actress; comedian
- Years active: 1959–present

Mary Jo Catlett (born September 2, 1938) is an American actress and comedian. She is a main cast member on the animated series SpongeBob SquarePants, providing the voice of Mrs. Puff. She is also known for originating the role of Ernestina in the 1964 Broadway production of Hello, Dolly! and for playing Pearl Gallagher, the third housekeeper on Diff'rent Strokes.

Catlett was born in Denver, Colorado, where she performed in a variety of plays and eventually directed a company of Pirates of Penzance. Throughout the 1960s and 1970s, she performed in Off-Broadway and Broadway musicals, often taking lighthearted, humorous roles. Since the late 1960s, Catlett has appeared in television shows such as M*A*S*H, The Dukes of Hazzard, and General Hospital. Catlett received Los Angeles Drama Critics Circle Awards in 1978 and 1980, a nomination for Best Featured Actress in a Musical at the Ovation Awards in 1995, and a Daytime Emmy Award nomination in 1990.

In 1998, Catlett joined the main cast of the then-upcoming Nickelodeon cartoon SpongeBob SquarePants as the voice of Mrs. Puff, SpongeBob's driving school teacher, who has become her longest-running and most well-known role. Series creator Stephen Hillenburg had seen Catlett perform on stage and sought her out for the part. She quickly accepted and has since voiced Mrs. Puff in every season of the cartoon, in addition to the SpongeBob feature films and video games. In 2001, she received an Annie Award nomination for her voice-over work as Mrs. Puff.

== Early life ==
Catlett was born in Denver, Colorado, on September 2, 1938, the daughter of Cornelia M. (née Callaghan) and Robert J. Catlett. She has a sister, Patricia Marie, who is a nun with the Dominican Order. Catlett is a Catholic.

== Career ==
=== Pre-SpongeBob SquarePants ===
As a Denver native, Catlett began her career in local productions and she would return to Denver many times. Her early acting jobs included appearances at Elitch Theatre, including in 1960s appeared in the summer stock productions of What Every Woman Knows and Say, Darling. In 1962 she appeared in Elitch Theatre's production of Jenny Kissed Me, Auntie Mame, and The Best Man. She would later appear at Elitch Theatre in Harvey (1985) and Nunsense (1987).

In 1974, Catlett originated the role of Mrs. Tiffany in Fashion: or, Life in New York. Her performance was well-received; The New York Times' theater critic Clive Barnes called Catlett and co-star Henrietta Valor "exceptional ... both particular delights," and Jerry Tallmer of the New York Post said that the play's casting was "top-notch, with particular praise from this quarter for Mary Jo Catlett." Catlett would reprise her role in the 1994 revival of Fashion.

Catlett described herself as a character actress. In a 1988 interview with the Orlando Sentinel, she said, "It has been a plus to be a character actress. There are plenty of them out there but far fewer than ingenues and leading ladies, who perhaps eventually become character actresses. But I always was a character actress. I always was round and funny."

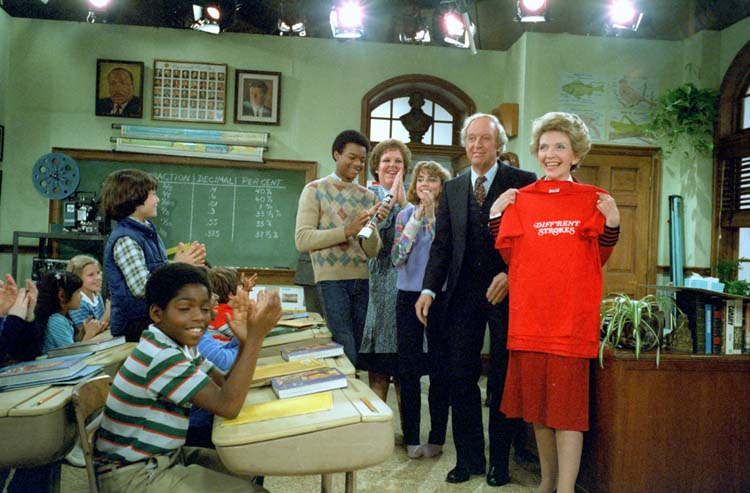
The cast of Diff'rent Strokes with Nancy Reagan in 1983

In 1976 and 1980, Catlett received Los Angeles Drama Critics Circle Awards for her roles in Come Back, Little Sheba and Philadelphia, Here I Come!, respectively. In 1995, Catlett's role as Madame de la Grande Bouche in Beauty and the Beast earned her a nomination for Best Featured Actress in a Musical at the Ovation Awards. Catlett became a main cast member on Diff'rent Strokes in its fifth season, playing the third housekeeper, Pearl Gallagher. She also played characters on General Hospital (for which she was nominated for a Daytime Emmy Award) and in several episodes of the television sitcom M*A*S*H.

She also performed scores for commercials, with one of her more notable ones being for Black Flag where she had a popular catchphrase, "The roaches check in but they don't check out."

In 1987, Catlett directed a production of Dan Goggin's Nunsense after meeting with Goggin and discussing the character of Sister Mary Regina. It was staged at the Mark Two Dinner Theatre in Orlando, Florida. Catlett decided to play Sister Mary as well, taking on a dual role as both director and performer. She was partially inspired to direct the show after witnessing directors' unfair treatment of her castmates in previous productions. She said, "I have worked with many directors who were tyrannical. You get afraid to do anything because he'll yell, 'Don't do that!' It makes you crazy... as a director, I believe that there can be a democracy."

After her run on Diff’rent Strokes, Catlett returned to her theatrical roots. In 1989, she took part in a regional revival of The Pajama Game in Pasadena, California, and during the 1990s she became a familiar face in Los Angeles theater, performing in productions such as Lend Me a Tenor, Beauty and the Beast, and The Music Man. Years later, in 2011, she portrayed Rosie — the lively grandmother of the lead character — in a stage adaptation of The Wedding Singer, with the Los Angeles Times praising her performance, noting the charm and energy she brought to the role.

She has also appeared/lent her voice in shows such as Modern Family, American Dad!, Kim Possible, Days of Our Lives, 2 Broke Girls, That's So Raven, Rugrats, Glee and The Grim Adventures of Bill and Mandy.

Catlett has also appeared in multiple films. She played Rosemary Ackerman in John Waters' dark comedy Serial Mom (1994), and later turned up in comedies such as The Benchwarmers and Let's Be Cops.

=== SpongeBob SquarePants ===
In 1998, Catlett was cast as the voice of Mrs. Puff, one of the main characters of Nickelodeon's then-upcoming animated series SpongeBob SquarePants. She is one of the show's nine main cast members and has performed in every season, as well as in the theatrical SpongeBob films and video games. Mrs. Puff has become her longest-running and most well-known role. Stephen Hillenburg, the creator of the cartoon, specifically sought out Catlett to voice Mrs. Puff. He had seen her perform on stage and had a strong vision for Mrs. Puff as a character. Catlett quickly accepted and attended early practice sessions with the rest of the voice cast. Her first official recording as Mrs. Puff took place on August 24, 1998; she recorded dialogue with Tom Kenny as SpongeBob SquarePants and Bill Fagerbakke as Patrick Star in a single booth at Nickelodeon Animation Studio for the episode "Boating School".

In 2001, Catlett was nominated for an Annie Award for her voice-over work as Mrs. Puff, placing in the category "Best Voice Acting by a Female Performer in an Animated Production." Kenny was also nominated, making Catlett and Kenny the first two SpongeBob cast members to be nominated for an award. In 2013 she along with the rest of the cast were nominated for a behind the voice actor's award for Best Vocal Ensemble in a Television Series - Children's/Educational.

Catlett voiced Mrs. Puff in 2004's The SpongeBob SquarePants Movie and the subsequent SpongeBob film sequels. She also voiced the character in the spin-off series Kamp Koral: SpongeBob's Under Years and The Patrick Star Show.

As of 2017, voicing Mrs. Puff is Catlett's only regular television role; Catlett described herself as "basically retired" in 2013, since she is good friends with the other SpongeBob cast members, making the SpongeBob recording booth an easy environment that requires less preparation than in-person performances. The About Group's Nancy Basille noted in 2016 that Catlett's "rich, low tones as teacher Mrs. Puff recall other roles she has had," citing Diff'rent Strokes and M*A*S*H as programs on which she had used a similar voice.

== Philanthropy ==
Catlett has performed novelty songs at many charity fundraisers and musical benefits, especially for organizations related to AIDS and Broadway-oriented organizations. Making multiple appearances at the annual Help Is on the Way concert series, which supports an organization that helps children that are affected by AIDS. She stated that she was motivated to raise awareness after the death of her close friend Robert Hoppe, who died of complications from AIDS in 1989.

She has also appeared in benefit concerts in support of the Entertainment Community Fund, an organization that seeks to provide assistance to performing arts and entertainment professionals. She has also performed at musical theater fundraisers.

== Filmography ==
=== Film ===
Year	Title	Role	Notes
1977	Semi-Tough	Earlene Emery	
1979	The Champ	Josie	
1982	The Beach Girls	Mrs. Brinker	
1982	The Best Little Whorehouse in Texas	Rita	
1982	O'Hara's Wife	Gloria	
1986	The Mouse and the Motorcycle	Kindergarten Teacher	
1994	Serial Mom	Rosemary Ackerman	
2004	The SpongeBob SquarePants Movie	Mrs. Puff	Voice
2006	The Benchwarmers	Mrs. Ellwood	
2009	Surprise Surprise	Winnie Blythman	
2014	Let's Be Cops	Luigi	
2014	Lucky Stiff	Old Lady	
2015	The SpongeBob Movie: Sponge Out of Water	Mrs. Puff	Voice
2020	The SpongeBob Movie: Sponge on the Run	Mrs. Puff	Voice
2024	Saving Bikini Bottom: The Sandy Cheeks Movie	Mrs. Puff	Voice
2025	Plankton: The Movie	Mrs. Puff	Voice
2025	The SpongeBob Movie: Search for SquarePants	Mrs. Puff	Voice

=== Television ===
Year	Title	Role	Notes
1975	The Bob Newhart Show	Mrs. Engleheart	
1975	The Waltons	Elvira Roswell	
1975	Kojak	Verna	
1976	How to Break Up a Happy Divorce	Soprano	
1976–1978	M*A*S*H	Becky/Nurse Walsh	3 episodes
1977	Flush	Bertha	1 episode
1977	Starsky and Hutch	Fifi (Hutch's maid)	1 episode
1978	Fantasy Island	Hooligan Hanreddy/Carlotta Smith	3 episodes
1979	The Dukes of Hazzard	Cousin Alice	1 episode
1981	Gimme a Break!	Betty	1 episode
1981	Foul Play	Stella Finkle	
1981–1989	The Smurfs	Additional voices	Various episodes
1982–1986	Diff'rent Strokes	Pearl Gallagher	Main cast, seasons 5–8
1986	ALF	Mary Jo	1 episode
1987	Murder, She Wrote	Mrs. Metcalf	1 episode
1989–1990	General Hospital	Mary Finnegan	2 episodes
1989	Night Court	Cynthia Dobby	
1993	Bonkers	Helga	Voice; 1 episode
1994	Saved by the Bell: The New Class	Mrs. Bluntley	
1996	Quack Pack	The Claw's mother	Voice 1 episode
1999	Rugrats	Doreen	1 episode
1999–present	SpongeBob SquarePants	Mrs. Puff	Voice; main cast
2004	The Grim Adventures of Billy & Mandy	Witch	Voice; 1 episode
2004	Lloyd in Space	Mrs. Horton	Voice; 1 episode
2004–2005	That's So Raven	Mrs. Applebaum	4 episodes
2007	State of Mind	Mrs. DelVecchio	1 episode
2007	Kim Possible	Aunt June	Voice; 1 episode
2007	American Dad!	Store Owner	Voice; 1 episode
2009	Days of Our Lives	Bev	1 episode
2009	Cold Case	Betty Joe Henders '09	1 episode
2010	Glee	Mrs. Carlisle	1 episode
2011	2 Broke Girls	Elaine	1 episode
2012	Shake It Up	Elderly Woman	1 episode
2012	Desperate Housewives	Debi Brown	1 episode
2013	The Mentalist	Ruth	1 episode
2013	Mr. Box Office	Gertrude	Episode: "Fifty Shades of Gray Hair"
2013	Modern Family	Edith	Episode: "Goodnight Gracie"
2013	Rizzoli & Isles	Bunny	1 episode
2014	Instant Mom	Mrs. Sharp	1 episode
2015	The McCarthys	Mrs. Murphy	1 episode
2016	The Odd Couple	Elderly Woman	1 episode
2016	Bajillion Dollar Propertie$	Ethel Simmons	1 episode
2017	Trial & Error	Brianne	1 episode
2017	Billy Dilley's Super-Duper Subterranean Summer	Aunt Agnes	Voice; episode: "Billy/Willie"
2017	Great News	Marie	1 episode
2018	The Kids Are Alright	Mrs. Strausser	1 episode
2019	Better Things	Rosie	1 episode
2020–2021	Good Girls	Dorothy	2 episodes
2021–2024	Kamp Koral: SpongeBob's Under Years	Mrs. Puff	Voice
2021–2024	The Patrick Star Show	Mrs. Puff	Voice; 3 episodes

=== Video games ===
Year	Title	Role	Notes
2001	SpongeBob SquarePants: Operation Krabby Patty	Mrs. Puff	Voice
2003	SpongeBob SquarePants: Battle for Bikini Bottom	Mrs. Puff	Voice
2005	SpongeBob SquarePants: Lights, Camera, Pants!	Mrs. Puff	Voice
2006	SpongeBob SquarePants: Creature from the Krusty Krab	Mrs. Puff	Voice
2010	SpongeBob's Boating Bash	Mrs. Puff	Voice
2013	SpongeBob Moves In!	Mrs. Puff	Voice
2020	SpongeBob SquarePants: Battle for Bikini Bottom – Rehydrated	Mrs. Puff	Reused dialogue from the original game
2023	SpongeBob SquarePants: The Cosmic Shake	Mrs. Puff	Voice
2023	Nickelodeon All-Star Brawl 2	Mrs. Puff	Voice
2024	SpongeBob SquarePants: The Patrick Star Game	Mrs. Puff	Voice
2025	Nicktoons & The Dice of Destiny	Mrs. Puff	Voice
2025	SpongeBob SquarePants: Titans of the Tide	Mrs. Puff	Voice

== Theatre ==
Year	Title	Role	Notes
1964–1970	Hello, Dolly!	Ernestina	Broadway, tour
1969	Canterbury Tales	Housewife, Village Girl and Parishioner	Broadway, tour
1972	Different Times	Hazel Hughes and child	Broadway
1972	Lysistrata	Deltazeta	Broadway
1974	Fashion	Mrs. Tiffany, Evelyn	
1989	The Pajama Game	Mabel	Broadway
1991	Lend Me a Tenor	Julia	
1982	Play Me a Country Song	Penny	Broadway (one performance)
1994	Beauty and the Beast	Madame de la Grande Bouche	Los Angeles
1998	The Music Man	Eulalie Shinn	
2011	The Wedding Singer	Rosie	
