= Walk cycle =

Looping animation of a walking character

A simple four-frame walk cycle

In animation, a walk cycle is a series of frames or illustrations drawn in sequence that loop to create an animation of a walking character. The walk cycle is looped over and over, thus avoiding having to animate each step again.

The walk cycle is an essential fundamental within the animation industry since it is performed by most characters and thus very noticeable to the viewer. It can convey the personality and background of a character. The cycle demonstrates the animator's proficiency as it requires the application of more than half of the Twelve basic principles of animation as well as accurate observation and understanding of the character.

== Origins ==
The creator of the term"walk cycle" is unknown; however, the term originated during the pre-cinematic period (1830s–1860s) as a combination of Optical toys and looping mechanics. It is the most compelling means of demonstrating one's comprehension and proficiency in animation, as it demands observational skills and the ability to attend to detail. The personality and background of a character can be conveyed by means of the walk cycle, which is considered the backbone of animation.

A walk cycle is built from key poses that create the illusion of continuous walking. The main poses are contact, down, passing, and up, which control the character's weight, balance, and movement. In addition to the legs, the arms, hips, torso, and head must move together to make the walk feel natural and expressive.

Animator James Baxter, a British animator known for his work at Walt Disney Animation Studios applies these principles by using body mechanics and timing to give each character a distinct personality. For example, while animating Belle in Disney's Beauty and the Beast (1991), Baxter gave her a graceful, ballet-inspired walk while keeping the movement believable and reflecting her independent personality.

== Character Animation ==
Character animation is the process of creating movement and acting for animated characters to communicate their personality, emotions, and physical characteristics. A walk cycle is a fundamental example of character animation, as it requires animators to coordinate the movement of the legs, arms, hips, torso, and head. Animators study body mechanics such as weight, balance, timing, and rhythm to make a character’s movement appear believable. Changes in these elements can also make the same basic walk communicate different personalities, such as confidence, sadness, or excitement.

The 12 Principles of Animation can be applied to a walk cycle to make character movement more natural, clear, and expressive. Timing, Slow In and Slow Out, and Arcs control the rhythm and smoothness of the walk. Follow Through and Overlapping Action add natural movement to the arms, hair, and clothing, while Secondary Action adds additional character movement. Exaggeration, Staging, and Appeal can strengthen the character’s personality, while Pose to Pose helps organize the main walking positions. Together, these principles turn a basic repeated walking motion into a believable and expressive character performance.

== 12 Principles of Animation ==
The 12 Principles of Animation are fundamental guidelines developed to help animators create movement that is believable, expressive, and visually engaging. The principles include Squash and Stretch, Anticipation, Staging, Straight Ahead Action and Pose to Pose, Follow Through and Overlapping Action, Slow In and Slow Out, Arcs, Secondary Action, Timing, Exaggeration, Solid Drawing, and Appeal. They were developed from the working practices of animators at Walt Disney Animation Studios and were formally introduced by Disney animators Ollie Johnston and Frank Thomas in their 1981 book The Illusion of Life: Disney Animation. The principles became an important foundation of character animation and continue to be applied in both traditional 2D and modern 3D animation to control movement, timing, weight, and character expression.

The 12 Principles of Animation can be applied to a walk cycle to make character movement more natural, clear, and expressive. Squash and Stretch helps show weight, while anticipation prepares the body for movement. Timing, Slow In and Slow Out, and Arcs control the rhythm and smoothness of the walk. Follow Through and Overlapping Action add natural movement to the arms, hair, and clothing, while Secondary Action adds additional character movement. Exaggeration, Staging, and Appeal can strengthen the character’s personality, while Pose to Pose helps organize the main walking positions. Together, these principles turn a basic repeated walking motion into a believable and expressive character performance.

== Creating a walk cycle ==
Walk cycles can be broken up into four key frames: the forward contact point, the first passing pose, the back contact point, and the second passing pose. Frames that are drawn between these key poses (traditionally known as in-betweens) are either hand-drawn or interpolated using computer software.

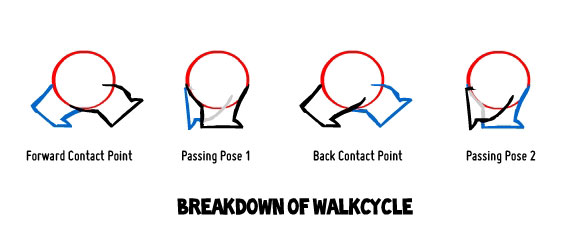
Key frames of a walk cycle

Besides the apparent move of the legs, many more details are necessary for a convincing walk cycle, like animation timing, movement of the arms, head and torsion of the whole body.

There exist many techniques to create walk cycles. Traditionally, walk cycles are hand-drawn, but over time with the introduction of new technologies for new mediums, walk cycles can be made in pixel art, 2D computer graphics, 3D computer graphics, stop motion, and cut-out animation, or using techniques like rotoscoping.

== Appeal ==
Character appeal in the walk cycle can be shown through efficiency, character personality, and physics. Every animator has their own art style. Therefore, by applying the art style with basic principles in a walk cycle can show the audience about the animator's experience and their unique style.

== Visual effect Creature animation ==
This type of animation will require an understanding of creature anatomy and in some cases will need mechanic’s engine knowledge. This is in contrast with human animation. However, blending visual effects with character walk cycles focuses more on a combination of dynamic simulation than a normal looping walk cycle.

Researching a reference is a lot since the animator needs to match the frame rate and motion of the effect with the character animation. For example, if a Godzilla is shooting a beam while walking, you need a layering back visual effect, a character with extra action, and a front visual effect to make sure that it blends well together. This process might need time and experience in order to achieve a flawless look.
