= SpongeBob's Boating Bash =

2010 video game

- Developers: ImPulse Games (Wii); Firebrand Games (DS)
- Publisher: THQ
- Series: SpongeBob
- Platforms: Wii; Nintendo DS
- Release: 2 March 2010
- Genre: Racing
- Modes: Single-player, multiplayer

SpongeBob's Boating Bash is a racing game made by American studio Impulse Games based on the animated comedy TV series SpongeBob SquarePants. It features SpongeBob SquarePants characters and is the first SpongeBob racing game since Nicktoons Winners Cup Racing. It is also the first SpongeBob game released by Firebrand Games for the Nintendo DS and ImPulse Games for the Wii. It is compatible with the Wii Wheel accessory. The game features more than 100 different options to customize a boat, and can be played with up to 4 people. Even though it is in the racing genre, most of the game's modes are comparable to a demolition derby.

== Plot ==
At Mrs. Puff's Boating School, it's the last test of the year and SpongeBob, as per usual, is trying to pass the driving portion of the exam. Despite Mrs. Puff's attempt to guide Spongebob through the methods of driving slowly, Spongebob still manages to horrendously fail on his boating test (for the 78th time). As he sits on the steps on the entrance to the school, looking quite depressed, a shark named Seymour Scales arrives outside the school in a bus. Seymour, hearing Spongebob's plight, introduces him to his own five-class driving system called "D.R.I.V.E." (Destruction, Recklessness, Impairment, Velocity, Escape). Seymore claims the D.R.I.V.E. system teaches Spongebob what not to do by having him do said actions. Spongebob signs up and pays for the course.

As Spongebob progresses through his lessons, Seymour insists Spongebob enlists his friends to help him, also having them pay to be part of the course, claiming they can help Spongebob. Patrick joins out of friendship, and Sandy agrees to help, wanting Spongebob to finally pass. Squidward only joins once he learns he gets to smash into Spongebob. Mr. Krabs senses Seymour might be up to something, but agrees to help Spongebob when Seymour "talks his language." Plankton notices the commotion and tries to offer Spongebob free driving lessons in exchange for the formula, but signs up for the course to thwart him when Spongebob declines. Spongebob also convinces Mermaid Man and Barnacle Boy to lend him their Invisible Boat Mobile.

Soon, Spongebob finishes his classes, but Seymour claims Spongebob still needs to finish his exams. Learning of Spongebob's progress, Mrs. Puff panics, thinking if someone could actually teach Spongebob, she'd be ruined. So Mrs. Puff attempts to, in disguise, thwart Spongebob in his final exam, but Spongebob still prevails.

With the exams completed, SpongeBob gets his boating license. Mrs. Puff arrives, with Spongebob thinking she's there to congratulate him. However, she informs him it's not a real license. Spongebob slowly realizes that the entire course was a scam, with Seymour tricking his friends into paying (and potentially selling all the boat scraps they produced). Spongebob attempts to confront him, but Seymour makes his escape in a truck. This leads to a final battle, fought in vehicles, in which SpongeBob wins. Seymour is then caught and sent to jail by Mermaid Man and Barnacle Boy. Spongebob is sad after all they went through, but Patrick tries to cheer him up reminding that boating school starts again next year. Spongebob happily agrees to stick with Mrs. Puff as a teacher, to Mrs. Puff's dismay.

== Gameplay ==
Throughout the game's Story mode, players engage in several racing and combat-centric objectives, each based on the D.R.I.V.E. acronym. These can also be freely selected and played outside of the Story mode:

- Destruction: The first class in Seymour's D.R.I.V.E. lessons. It requires the player to smash into opponents' boats and pick up the parts that are produced from the smash. In some tests during the Story mode, the player is required to reach a set amount of collected parts. In others, the player has to finish in the Top 3 to achieve either a ranking.
- Recklessness: This class requires the player to smash into opponents' boats, which awards points to the player. In some tests, the player is required to achieve a set score target, while in others, the player must place in the Top 3 to receive a ranking.
- Reckless Velocity: Reckless Velocity is a variation of Recklessness, and is a combination of Recklessness and Velocity, which is the fourth class in the D.R.I.V.E series. Reckless Velocity requires players to complete a race within a certain time limit and also earn a certain number of points to obtain a ranking.
- Impairment: In this class, players must knock out opponents within a set time limit. When the player collides with an opposition player, stars form around that opponent, and they are briefly stopped in the current position. This gives the player the opportunity to repeatedly smash that opponent, eventually knocking them out.
- Velocity: The player must complete a race against up to seven opponents as fast as possible. To achieve a ranking, the player must finish in Top 3.
- Escape: The player must knock opponents out while they actively hunt down the player. The damage done to opponents is increased massively, however, damage done to the player is also increased. Escape occurs in waves, and at the end of each wave, the player's car will be slightly healed, the amount decreasing on each wave. The player must destroy as many cars as possible, again to achieve a ranking.
