= Surprise Surprise (film) =

2009 film directed by Jerry Turner

Surprise Surprise is a 2009 drama written by Travis Michael Holder and Jerry Turner and directed by Jerry Turner.

== Plot ==
Den, an in-the-closet TV star, and his younger disabled lover's lives are turned upside down when Den's troubled teenage son, David, whom Den never knew he had, comes into their lives.

David, a 16-year-old homophobe, shows up at the doorstep of Den's Hollywood Hills home and discovers both his famous dad and his younger lover Colin. Colin is a former dancer, now using a wheelchair. Though their relationship is secret, Den and Colin are committed to each other, something they hope will improve David's disposition, given his rocky adolescence.

Their otherwise seemingly idyllic and coveted life is permanently altered, as they are forced to confront an already problematic relationship. Eventually, all three men with the help of their unconventional and extended family are compelled to join together and redefine the concept of family.

== Cast ==
- Travis Michael Holder as Den Jorgensen
- Luke Eberl (Lucas Elliot) as David Jorgensen
- John Brotherton (of One Life to Live) as Colin Alexandre
- Deborah Shelton (former Miss USA and actress on Dallas) as Junie Hannah
- Jesse C. Boyd as Jason Aaron
- Mary Jo Catlett (of Diff'rent Strokes) as Winnie Blythman
