= Mark O'Hare =

American cartoonist

- Born: Mark Sean O'Hare; July 18, 1968 (age 58); San Pedro, California, U.S.
- Education: Purdue University California Institute of the Arts
- Occupations: Cartoonist, writer, storyboard artist, animator, director
- Years active: 1992–present
- Known for: Rocko's Modern Life; SpongeBob SquarePants; Camp Lazlo

Mark Sean O'Hare (born July 18, 1968) is an American cartoonist, animator, writer and storyboard artist who created the comic strip Citizen Dog.

O'Hare is well known for his work on animated television shows as a writer and storyboard artist for Rocko's Modern Life, SpongeBob SquarePants, Dexter's Laboratory, The Powerpuff Girls, Hey Arnold!, The Angry Beavers, The Mighty B!, Chowder, and The Ren & Stimpy Show. Throughout the run of the series, O'Hare served as the creative director and supervising producer on Camp Lazlo. In 2016, he was employed as a storyboard artist for Illumination Entertainment.

O'Hare was awarded an Emmy from the Academy of Television Arts & Sciences in 2007 for "Outstanding Animated Program" on Camp Lazlo and again in 2008.

== Early life and education ==
O'Hare was initially enrolled in the aeronautical engineering program at Purdue University; however, after his sophomore year, he shifted focus to study graphic design upon illustrating a comic strip titled Art Gallery for the student newspaper, The Exponent. The comic ran from the autumn of 1987 to the spring of 1990. Afterward, he was accepted into the character animation program at California Institute of the Arts.

He is a close affiliate of fellow director Tim Hill.

== Filmography ==
=== Television ===
Year	Title	Notes
1993–1996	Rocko's Modern Life	director/assistant director/storyboard artist/storyboard clean-up/assistant storyboard artist/additional writer/story
1995	The Ren & Stimpy Show	storyboard artist (Episode: "Ol' Blue Nose")
1996; 1998	Hey Arnold!	storyboard artist/storyboard director/director
1997	The Angry Beavers	storyboard artist/assistant storyboard artist
1997	Life with Louie	storyboard artist
1997; 2003	Dexter's Laboratory	storyboard artist/writer/story
1999–2004,	SpongeBob SquarePants	storyboard artist/writer/staff writer/storyboard director/character layout artist
2002	Jeffrey Cat: Claw and Order	creator/model/writer/executive producer (pilot)
2003	Whatever Happened to... Robot Jones?	writer/storyboard artist
2003–2004	The Powerpuff Girls	storyboard artist/writer/story
2005–2008	Camp Lazlo	story/writer/storyboard artist/storyboard director/creative director/supervising producer/director
2007	Shorty McShorts' Shorts	storyboard artist ("Mascot Prep" short)
2008–2009	The Mighty B!	storyboard director
2008	Tak and the Power of Juju	storyboard artist/director
2009	Chowder	story/storyboard artist
2010	Adventure Time	storyboard revisionist

=== Film ===
Year	Title	Notes
1992	Cool World	character designer
2004	Shrek 2	storyboard artist
2004	Shark Tale	additional storyboard artist
2010	Despicable Me	storyboard artist
2011	Hop	storyboard artist
2012	The Lorax	storyboard artist
2013	Despicable Me 2	storyboard artist
2015	Minions	additional story artist
2016	The Secret Life of Pets	story artist
2018	The Grinch	head of story
2020	The SpongeBob Movie: Sponge on the Run	co-head of story
2022	Minions: The Rise of Gru	storyboard artist
2024	Saving Bikini Bottom: The Sandy Cheeks Movie	head of story
2025	The SpongeBob Movie: Search for SquarePants	head of story / animation director
