= Regular Show season 4 =

Regular Show
- Season 4
- Region 4 DVD cover
- Showrunner: J. G. Quintel
- Starring: J. G. Quintel; William Salyers; Sam Marin; Mark Hamill; Roger Craig Smith
- No. of episodes: 37

Release
- Original network: Cartoon Network
- Original release: October 1, 2012 – August 12, 2013

Season chronology
- ← Previous; Season 3 Next → Season 5

The fourth season of the American animated comedy television series Regular Show, created by J. G. Quintel, originally aired on Cartoon Network in the United States. Quintel created the series' pilot using characters from his comedy shorts for the canceled anthology series The Cartoonstitute. He developed Regular Show from his own experiences in college. Simultaneously, several of the show's main characters originated from his animated shorts 2 in the AM PM and The Naïve Man from Lolliland. Following its third season's success, Regular Show was renewed for a fourth season on October 26, 2011. The season ran from October 1, 2012, to August 12, 2013, and was produced by Cartoon Network Studios.

For this season, the writers were Sean Szeles, Mike Roth, John Infantino, Michele Cavin and Matt Price.

== Development ==
=== Concept ===
Two 23-year-old friends, a blue jay named Mordecai and a raccoon named Rigby, are employed as groundskeepers at a park and spend their days trying to slack off and entertain themselves by any means. This is much to the chagrin of their boss Benson and their coworker Skips, but the delight of Pops. Their other coworkers, Muscle Man (an overweight green man) and Hi-Five Ghost (a ghost with a hand extending from the top of his head) serve as their rivals. Introduced in this season is Thomas (a goat), an intern for the park.

=== Production ===
Many of the characters are loosely based on those developed for Quintel's student films at California Institute of the Arts: The Naive Man From Lolliland and 2 in the AM PM. Quintel pitched Regular Show for Cartoon Network's Cartoonstitute project, in which the network allowed artists to create pilots with no notes to be optioned as a show possibly. After The Cartoonstitute was scrapped, and Cartoon Network executives approved the greenlight for Regular Show, production officially began on August 14, 2009. After being green-lit, Quintel recruited several indie comic book artists to compose the show's staff, as their style matched close to what he desired for the series. The season was the last to feature contributions from Kat Morris, who left to work on Steven Universe. For this season, the writers were Quintel, Mike Roth, John Infantino, Michele Cavin and Matt Price, who is additionally the story editor while being produced by Cartoon Network Studios.

The fourth season of Regular Show was produced between September 2011 and September 2012. It utilizes double entendres and mild language; Quintel stated that, although the network wanted to step up from the more child-oriented fare, some restrictions came along with this switch.

== Episodes ==
No. overall	No. in season	Title	Directed by	Written and storyboarded by	Original release date	Prod. code	U.S. viewers (millions)
80	1	"Exit 9B" (Note: This is a half-hour episode.)	Robert Alvarez (animation)	Calvin Wong, Toby Jones, Andres Salaff, and Madeline Queripel	October 1, 2012	1012-081; 1012-082	3.05
Mordecai and Rigby are the only ones who can save their brainwashed friends and the park. Guest voices: Roger Craig Smith as Garrett Bobby Ferguson Jr. and Thomas
81	2	"Starter Pack"	Robert Alvarez (animation)	Benton Connor and Hilary Florido	October 8, 2012	1012-088	1.86
Mordecai and Rigby want to stop Muscle Man from messing with Thomas. Song: "Toast of the Town" by Mötley Crüe
82	3	"Terror Tales of the Park II"	Robert Alvarez (animation)	Benton Connor and Hilary Florido ("Payback"), Sean Szeles and Kat Morris ("Party Bus" and "Wallpaper Man")	October 15, 2012	1012-083; 1012-084	3.11
The group passes time by telling each other scary stories while driving to a Halloween party. • "Payback" – Mordecai's deceased uncle haunts him after accidentally knocking him into the ball return at a bowling alley. • "Party Bus" – Mordecai, Rigby, Margaret, and Eileen board a haunted bus where they find the passengers aging as the bus moves forward and have to try to escape. • "Wallpaper Man" – Mordecai and Rigby hire a man to re-wallpaper the house, but they quickly find out that he is a giant evil spider, and they struggle to defeat him.
83	4	"Pie Contest"	Robert Alvarez (animation)	Sarah Oleksyk and Hellen Jo	October 22, 2012	1012-085	2.62
Mordecai and Rigby want to be judges at a pie contest, not realizing the amount of honesty they need to have.
84	5	"150 Piece Kit"	Robert Alvarez (animation)	Calvin Wong and Toby Jones	October 29, 2012	1012-086	2.11
Benson attempts to prove to his employees that he can play an advanced, extremely long drum solo. Note: Co-composer John Enroth wrote and performed Benson's epic drum solo in this episode.
85	6	"Bald Spot"	Robert Alvarez (animation)	Andres Salaff and Madeline Queripel	November 12, 2012	1012-087	2.61
Muscle Man tries to cover his bald spot so Starla will not notice during their first anniversary. Guest voice: Seymour Cassel as Tony Barber
86	7	"Guy's Night"	Robert Alvarez (animation)	Sean Szeles and Kat Morris	November 19, 2012	1012-089	2.46
Pops tries to prove he is "one of the guys" by completing the milk chugging challenge, but this soon leads him to a strange place with weird white creatures. Song: "Party All the Time" by Eddie Murphy
87	8	"One Pull Up"	Robert Alvarez (animation)	Sarah Oleksyk and Hellen Jo	November 26, 2012	1012-090	2.14
Eileen trains Rigby to perform a pull-up for the park fitness test before the end of the week or else he'll be fired, but he becomes too strong and heavy for his good.
88	9	"The Christmas Special"	J. G. Quintel and Mike Roth; Robert Alvarez (animation)	Sean Szeles, Kat Morris, Benton Connor, and Hilary Florido	December 3, 2012	1012-093; 1012-094	2.71
Mordecai and Rigby have to destroy a magical present for Santa and save Christmas from one of his elves. Songs: "Rockin' Around the Christmas Tree" by Brenda Lee and "Christmas Eve/Sarajevo 12/24" by Savatage (later re-released by Trans-Siberian Orchestra); Guest voices: Thomas Haden Church as Quillgin, Ed Asner as Santa Claus and Kurtwood Smith as Gene
89	10	"T.G.I. Tuesday"	Robert Alvarez (animation)	Calvin Wong and Toby Jones	January 7, 2013	1012-091	2.81
Mordecai, Rigby, and Eileen plan a going-away party at the park's ballroom for Margaret due to her transferring to another college. But the deceased owners refuse to keep it clean while waiting for the girl that never arrives. Song: "The Ballroom Blitz" by The Sweet; Guest voices: Jaleel White as Daryll and Cool Shade
90	11	"Firework Run"	Robert Alvarez (animation)	Andres Salaff and Madeline Queripel	January 14, 2013	1012-092	2.24
When Muscle Man mistakely and ignorantly sets off fireworks meant for a Fourth of July celebration at the park, he, Mordecai, Rigby and Hi-Five Ghost have to travel south of town to buy a powerful firework at a factory or else Benson will have them fired.
91	12	"The Longest Weekend"	Robert Alvarez (animation)	Sarah Oleksyk and Hellen Jo	January 21, 2013	1012-095	2.51
Wanting to test their relationship, Starla has Muscle Man avoid contact with her for a weekend, which proves to be a difficult challenge for the both of them.
92	13	"Sandwich of Death"	Robert Alvarez (animation)	Andres Salaff and Madeline Queripel	January 28, 2013	1012-097	2.54
When Benson falls ill after incorrectly eating a deadly sandwich that Mordecai and Rigby had bought from a Death Kwon Do restaurant, they have to get the cure for him or else he will die in six hours with the help of their old friend, the Death Kwon Do sensei.
93	14	"Ace Balthazar Lives"	Robert Alvarez (animation)	Benton Connor and Hilary Florido	February 4, 2013	1012-098	2.27
Mordecai and Rigby attempt to reunite a rock band when they think that their presumably deceased frontman is living at the park.
94	15	"Do or Diaper"	Robert Alvarez (animation)	Sean Szeles and Kat Morris	February 11, 2013	1012-099	2.67
Mordecai makes a bet with Muscle Man that he will kiss Margaret by Friday at midnight or else he will wear a diaper for a week. Song: "You Might Think" by The Cars
95	16	"Quips"	Robert Alvarez (animation)	Sarah Oleksyk and Hellen Jo	February 18, 2013	1012-100	2.43
Skips' cousin Quips shows up at the park for game night, much to everyone's annoyance because of his bad jokes.
96	17	"Caveman"	Robert Alvarez (animation)	Calvin Wong and Toby Jones	February 25, 2013	1012-101	2.44
After Mordecai and Rigby accidentally defrost a caveman, they try to civilize him so he can stay at the park.
97	18	"That's My Television"	Robert Alvarez (animation)	Andres Salaff and Madeline Queripel	March 4, 2013	1012-102	2.40
Mordecai and Rigby help RGB2 escape from the studio lot so he can avoid starring in a revival of his show.
98	19	"A Bunch of Full Grown Geese"	Robert Alvarez (animation)	Calvin Wong and Toby Jones	March 25, 2013	1012-096	2.58
When a quartet of aggressive geese show up at the park, Mordecai and Rigby call upon some old friends to get rid of them. Song: "The Touch" by Stan Bush
99	20	"Fool Me Twice"	Robert Alvarez (animation)	Calvin Wong and Toby Jones	April 1, 2013	1012-116	2.14
Mordecai and Rigby want to win the grand prize on a Japanese game show. Guest voices: Andrew Kishino as the Game Master
100	21	"Limousine Lunchtime"	Robert Alvarez (animation)	Benton Connor and Hilary Florido	April 8, 2013	1012-103	2.35
Mordecai and Rigby accidentally make a mess inside Mr. Maellard's expensive White Stallion limousine while eating lunch and have to compete in a demolition derby to win a new one before Maellard gets back.
101	22	"Picking Up Margaret"	Robert Alvarez (animation)	Sean Szeles and Kat Morris	April 15, 2013	1012-104	2.26
Mordecai offers to give Margaret a ride to the airport, but runs into trouble with a street gang. Song: "We Are the Champions" by Queen
102	23	"K.I.L.I.T. Radio"	Robert Alvarez (animation)	Benton Connor and Sarah Oleksyk	April 22, 2013	1012-105	1.94
Muscle Man records a song for Starla and attempts to get it played on his favorite radio station.
103	24	"Carter and Briggs"	Robert Alvarez (animation)	Calvin Wong and Toby Jones	May 6, 2013	1012-106	2.12
Mordecai and Rigby enter a donut maneuvering contest in hopes of winning an appearance on their favorite cop show.
104	25	"Skips' Stress"	Robert Alvarez (animation)	Andres Salaff and Madeline Queripel	May 13, 2013	1012-107	2.08
Skips' stress level rises to critical proportions, so he has to lower it before it kills him.
105	26	"Cool Cubed"	Robert Alvarez (animation)	Benton Connor and Hilary Florido	May 20, 2013	1012-108	2.37
When Thomas gets a severe brain freeze after chugging down a "Cool Cubed" smoothie, Mordecai and Rigby shrink and travel into his head to stop it from freezing his brain's core.
106	27	"Trailer Trashed"	Robert Alvarez (animation)	Calvin Wong and Kat Morris	May 27, 2013	1012-109	2.04
Muscle Man tries to save his trailer after it fails a health inspection, but the inspector is not quite who he seems to be.
107	28	"Meteor Moves"	Robert Alvarez (animation)	Benton Connor and Sarah Oleksyk	June 10, 2013	1012-110	2.46
Mordecai plans to kiss Margaret during a meteor shower. Guest voice: Wayne Knight as the Guardian of the Friend Zone
108	29	"Family BBQ"	Robert Alvarez (animation)	Benton Connor and Hilary Florido	June 17, 2013	1012-113	2.27
Mordecai tries to shake hands with Margaret's father despite his instant dislike of Mordecai. Ultimately, they both compete in a cannonball contest.
109	30	"The Last Laserdisc Player"	Robert Alvarez (animation)	Calvin Wong and Toby Jones	June 24, 2013	1012-111	2.25
Mordecai, Rigby, Muscle Man and Hi-Five Ghost search for a LaserDisc player to watch the rare director's cut of a cult classic.
110	31	"Country Club"	Robert Alvarez (animation)	Andres Salaff and Madeline Queripel	July 1, 2013	1012-112	2.51
Mordecai and Rigby have to recover a golf cart that is taken by the park's neighboring wealthy country club members, who have also stolen many of the group's items and turned them into toilets.
111	32	"Blind Trust"	Robert Alvarez (animation)	Andres Salaff and Madeline Queripel	July 15, 2013	1012-117	2.47
Pops has Mordecai and Rigby help Benson down a mountain while he is blindfolded for him to show trust in the duo. Guest voices: Fred Tatasciore as Moose and other assorted sacred animals
112	33	"World's Best Boss"	Robert Alvarez (animation)	Kat Morris and James Kim	July 15, 2013	1012-114	2.47
The group wants to give Benson a "World's Best Boss" mug for his tenth-anniversary at the park, but it proves to be more complicated than they thought. Guest voices: Andrew Kishino as Doug McFarland, David Kaye as commercial voice-over speaker and Boss #3, and Robin Atkin Downes as Rogers, Boss #2, and delivery guy
113	34	"Last Meal"	Robert Alvarez (animation)	Sarah Oleksyk and Owen Dennis	July 22, 2013	1012-115	2.55
Muscle Man wants to binge on his favorite foods before going on a diet but soon has to deal with Death, who attempts to take his soul if he loses to him in a hot dog eating contest. Song: "(Don't Fear) The Reaper" (instrumental) by Blue Öyster Cult
114	35	"Sleep Fighter"	Robert Alvarez (animation)	Kat Morris and James Kim	July 29, 2013	1012-119	2.06
The group tries to help Muscle Man with his problem of beating them up in his sleep.
115	36	"Party Re-Pete"	Robert Alvarez (animation)	Sarah Oleksyk and Owen Dennis	August 5, 2013	1012-120	2.88
The group has to save Benson after an evil party company kidnaps him. But ultimately, they discover a cloning chamber, which explains why "Party Benson" is different.
116	37	"Steak Me Amadeus"	Robert Alvarez (animation)	Benton Connor and Hilary Florido	August 12, 2013	1012-118	2.44
Mordecai wants to ask Margaret to be his girlfriend. Songs: "Piano Concerto No. 21" and "Symphony No. 25" by Wolfgang Amadeus Mozart
