= Regular Show season 3 =

Regular Show
- Season 3
- DVD cover
- Showrunner: J. G. Quintel
- Starring: J. G. Quintel; William Salyers; Sam Marin; Mark Hamill
- No. of episodes: 39

Release
- Original network: Cartoon Network
- Original release: September 19, 2011 – September 3, 2012

Season chronology
- ← Previous; Season 2 Next → Season 4

The third season of the American animated television series Regular Show, created by J. G. Quintel, originally aired on Cartoon Network in the United States. Quintel created the series' pilot using characters from his comedy shorts for the canceled anthology series The Cartoonstitute. He developed Regular Show from his own experiences in college. Simultaneously, several of the show's main characters originated from his animated shorts 2 in the AM PM and The Naïve Man from Lolliland. Following its second season's success, Regular Show was renewed for a third season on November 16, 2010, ahead of its second-season premiere. The season ran from September 19, 2011 to September 3, 2012 and was produced by Cartoon Network Studios.

== Development ==
=== Concept ===
Two 23-year-old friends, a blue jay named Mordecai and a raccoon named Rigby, are employed as groundskeepers at a park and spend their days trying to slack off and entertain themselves by any means. This is much to the chagrin of their boss Benson and their coworker Skips, but the delight of Pops. Their other coworkers, Muscle Man (an overweight green man) and Hi-Five Ghost (a ghost with a hand extending from the top of his head) serve as their rivals.

=== Production ===
Many of the characters are loosely based on those developed for Quintel's student films at California Institute of the Arts: The Naive Man From Lolliland and 2 in the AM PM. Quintel pitched Regular Show for Cartoon Network's Cartoonstitute project, in which the network allowed artists to create pilots with no notes to be optioned as a show possibly. After The Cartoonstitute was scrapped, and Cartoon Network executives approved the greenlight for Regular Show, production officially began on August 14, 2009. After being green-lit, Quintel recruited several indie comic book artists to compose the show's staff, as their style matched close to what he desired for the series. For this season, the writers were Mike Roth, John Infantino, Jack Thomas, Michele Cavin, and Matt Price, who is also the story editor while being produced by Cartoon Network Studios.

The third season of Regular Show was produced between November 2010 and August 2011. It utilizes double entendres and mild language; Quintel stated that, although the network wanted to step up from the more child-oriented fare, some restrictions came with this switch.

== Episodes ==
No. overall	No. in season	Title	Animation direction by	Written and storyboarded by	Original release date	Prod. code	U.S. viewers (millions)
41	1	"Stick Hockey"	Robert Alvarez	Sean Szeles and Kat Morris	September 19, 2011	1009-041	2.00
After Benson unjustifiably throws out Mordecai and Rigby's stick hockey table, he feels guilty and tries to help them get it back.
42	2	"Bet to Be Blonde"	Robert Alvarez	Benton Connor and Calvin Wong	September 26, 2011	1009-042	1.99
Mordecai dyes his hair blonde and joins a group of blonde-haired men after losing a bet to Rigby, but this also breaks their friendship. Guest voices: Roger Craig Smith as the blonde men
43	3	"Skips Strikes"	Robert Alvarez	Benton Connor and Calvin Wong	October 3, 2011	1009-046	2.08
Skips is forced to quit the bowling team that he, Mordecai, Rigby, and Benson are on when a secret of his is threatened to be revealed by a rival bowling team but has to return when a deadly bet comes on.
44	4	"Terror Tales of the Park" (Note: This is a half-hour episode.)	Robert Alvarez	J. G. Quintel ("Creepy Doll"), Andres Salaff and Ben Adams ("Death Metal Crash Pit"), Sean Szeles and Kat Morris ("In the House")	October 10, 2011	1009-044	1.97
44	4	"Terror Tales of the Park"	Robert Alvarez	J. G. Quintel ("Creepy Doll"), Andres Salaff and Ben Adams ("Death Metal Crash Pit"), Sean Szeles and Kat Morris ("In the House")	October 10, 2011	1009-045	1.97
The group tell each other scary stories. • "Creepy Doll" – Pops finds an old doll from his youth that ends up coming to life and turning very scary. • "Death Metal Crash Pit" – Muscle Man and Hi-Five Ghost want to crash an old RV into the park's giant sinkhole but quickly find out that ghosts of a heavy metal band haunt the RV. • "In the House" – Rigby is turned into a house after he throws eggs at a wizard's house, and the wizard soon kills the others.
45	5	"Camping Can Be Cool"	Robert Alvarez	Sean Szeles and Kat Morris	October 17, 2011	1009-048	2.05
Mordecai and Rigby take Margaret and Eileen camping in a restricted area of a forest, in which they quickly run into trouble for trespassing after encountering a Stag-Man. Guest voices: Robert Englund as the Stag-Man
46	6	"Slam Dunk"	Robert Alvarez	Andres Salaff and Ben Adams	October 24, 2011	1009-047	2.08
Mordecai and Rigby play a two-on-two match of basketball against Muscle Man and Hi-Five Ghost to earn rights to use the computer so Mordecai can create a website for Margaret. The Basketball King helps them by giving them powers after realizing how poor their skills were. Song: "Hey Man Nice Shot" by Filter; Guest voices: Carl Weathers as the Basketball King
47	7	"Cool Bikes"	Robert Alvarez	Benton Connor and Calvin Wong	November 7, 2011	1009-050	1.83
Mordecai and Rigby try to get Benson to admit that they are cool to regain their cart privileges. However, problems arise when the duo are put on trial by a galactic court when they become "too cool".
48	8	"House Rules"	Robert Alvarez	John Infantino and Andres Salaff	November 14, 2011	1009-052	2.30
Protesting against Benson's rules for the house, Mordecai and Rigby stumble upon an anarchist society after trying to find a place that is not governed by rules. Guest voices: Roger Craig Smith as the No Rules Man
49	9	"Rap It Up"	Robert Alvarez	Sean Szeles and Kat Morris	November 21, 2011	1009-054	2.14
Pops enters a rap battle against a group of cruel rappers that he plans to win by reciting poetry, which makes Mordecai and Rigby nervous due to Pops' unusual concept of "rapping". Guest voices: Donald Glover as Alpha Dog, MC Lyte as Demel-ishun and Tyler, The Creator as Blitz Comet and Big Trouble
50	10	"Cruisin'"	Robert Alvarez	Benton Connor and Calvin Wong	November 28, 2011	1009-051	2.17
Mordecai and Rigby try to obtain a girl's number by cruising to avoid losing a bet and paying for a fancy dinner with Margaret and Eileen.
51	11	"Under the Hood"	Robert Alvarez	Andres Salaff and Toby Jones	December 12, 2011	1009-053	2.32
After getting Muscle Man and Hi-Five Ghost fired for false accusations of spraying graffiti at the park, Mordecai and Rigby have to catch the real perpetrator to prove their innocence. Guest voices: Troy Baker as Park Avenue
52	12	"Weekend at Benson's"	Robert Alvarez	Benton Connor and Hilary Florido	January 16, 2012	1009-056	1.99
After inadvertently knocking Benson unconscious, Mordecai and Rigby help him impress his neighbor Audrey at her party, but her ex-boyfriend gets in the way of that. Song: "Mississippi Queen" by Mountain; Guest voices: Courtenay Taylor as Audrey and Roger Craig Smith as Chuck
53	13	"Fortune Cookie"	Robert Alvarez	Benton Connor, Calvin Wong, and Hilary Florido	January 23, 2012	1009-049	1.86
Rigby swaps fortune cookie fortunes with Benson in hopes of improving his luck, and it works, but Benson's luck goes so bad, it ruins his life. Guest voices: James Hong as the Chinese restaurant waiter and the warlock
54	14	"Think Positive"	Robert Alvarez	Sean Szeles and Kat Morris	January 30, 2012	1009-058	2.48
Barred from yelling at Mordecai and Rigby further by Pops, Benson has to find a way to manage his anger, or he'll be fired.
55	15	"Skips vs. Technology"	Robert Alvarez	Calvin Wong and Toby Jones	February 6, 2012	1009-060	2.39
Skips hopes to fix a computer error caused by Mordecai and Rigby but cannot due to his lack of knowledge on modern technology. He gets help from his friend, Techmo, but they soon discover that the virus is stronger than they think. Song: "I Get Around" by The Beach Boys; Guest voices: Steven Blum as Techmo and the Doom-Ma-Geddon virus
56	16	"Butt Dial"	Robert Alvarez	Sean Szeles and Kat Morris	February 13, 2012	1009-068	2.45
Mordecai attempts to retrieve Margaret's phone to dispose of an embarrassing singing voicemail he inadvertently recorded. Guest voices: Rich Fulcher as some of the Keepers of the Voicemail
57	17	"Eggscellent"	Robert Alvarez	J. G. Quintel	February 27, 2012	1009-057	2.32
Rigby falls into a coma as a result of his egg allergies after he attempts to complete a food challenge involving a massive omelette to win a commemorative trucker hat, leaving Mordecai to do so himself. Song: "Holding Out for a Hero" by Bonnie Tyler; This episode won a Primetime Emmy Award in the Short-format Animation category.
58	18	"Gut Model"	Robert Alvarez	Sean Szeles and Kat Morris	March 5, 2012	1009-062	2.18
Feeling under-appreciated by his co-workers, Muscle Man quits his job to work as a gut model. Guest voices: Paul F. Tompkins and Andrew Daly as Filbert and Mulligan, respectively, of Mommy Monthly Magazine
59	19	"Video Game Wizards"	Robert Alvarez	Benton Connor and Hilary Florido	March 26, 2012	1009-065	2.08
Mordecai enlists Skips' help to win the "Maximum Glove" controller accessory at a video game competition, negelcting Rigby's involvement.
60	20	"Big Winner"	Robert Alvarez	Benton Connor and Hilary Florido	April 2, 2012	1009-076	2.38
Mordecai and Rigby prank Muscle Man on his birthday with a fake lottery ticket, but they regret it when he takes it too literally.
61	21	"The Best Burger in the World"	Robert Alvarez	Andres Salaff	April 9, 2012	1009-064	2.46
When a once-in-a-lifetime event to try the world's best burgers comes to the park, Mordecai and Rigby end up becoming desperate for it when Benson prohibits them from doing so until they have finished a whole week of their most recent neglected work. Song: "Flower Duet" by Léo Delibes
62	22	"Replaced"	Robert Alvarez	J. G. Quintel, Mike Roth, and John Infantino	April 16, 2012	1009-043	2.30
Mordecai and Rigby fight to keep their jobs when Benson plans to replace them with an ostrich and possum duo. Guest voices: Roger Craig Smith as Jeremy and Chad
63	23	"Trash Boat"	Robert Alvarez	Benton Connor and Hilary Florido	April 23, 2012	1009-066	N/A
Inspired by the frontman of a famous rock band, Rigby changes his name to Trash Boat. However, the name causes him to garner negative attention and he now has to change it back.
64	24	"Fists of Justice"	Robert Alvarez	Andres Salaff	April 30, 2012	1009-067	2.25
Mordecai and Rigby do Skips' work so Skips can have more time to combat a long-time enemy of the Guardians of Eternal Youth.
65	25	"Yes Dude Yes"	Robert Alvarez	Sean Szeles and Kat Morris	May 7, 2012	1009-070	2.12
Dejected after he thinks he has witnessed Margaret becoming engaged, Mordecai befriends a girl named C.J. Still, things go wrong when he is caught in the middle over a film and misunderstandings. Guest voices: Linda Cardellini as C.J.
66	26	"Busted Cart"	Robert Alvarez	Benton Connor and Hilary Florido	May 14, 2012	1009-055	2.26
Mordecai and Rigby break the cart and have to take a road trip with Benson to the dealership before the warranty expires or Benson will be fired by Mr. Maellard.
67	27	"Dead at Eight"	Robert Alvarez	Calvin Wong and Toby Jones	May 28, 2012	1009-072	2.05
Mordecai and Rigby have to babysit Death's son so he can spare Muscle Man's life. Guest voices: Michael Dorn as Thomas and Elle Newlands as Death's wife.
68	28	"Access Denied"	Robert Alvarez	Sean Szeles and Kat Morris	June 4, 2012	1009-074	2.59
Mordecai and Rigby try to find their way into a nightclub for Margaret's birthday party. Guest voices: Natasha Leggero as Ladonna
69	29	"Muscle Mentor"	Robert Alvarez	Andres Salaff	June 11, 2012	1009-071	2.73
Rigby has to last an entire day in a torturous and humiliating mentorship program coached by Muscle Man to keep his job.
70	30	"Trucker Hall of Fame"	Robert Alvarez	Calvin Wong and Toby Jones	June 18, 2012	1009-061	2.92
Following the passing of Muscle Man's father, Mordecai and Rigby accompany him on a road trip to spread the incinerated remains of his father's trucker hat at the Trucker Hall of Fame. However, Muscle Man soon discovers a startling secret about his father. Guest voices: Fred Tatasciore as Mr. Sorrenstein, Muscle Man's father
71	31	"Out of Commission"	Robert Alvarez	Calvin Wong and Toby Jones	June 25, 2012	1009-059	2.48
Mordecai and Rigby spend the day with the cart that they bring to life when they are instructed to get rid of it after Benson purchases a high tech replacement, but the cart wants to do certain things beforehand.
72	32	"Fancy Restaurant"	Robert Alvarez	Calvin Wong and Toby Jones	July 16, 2012	1009-073	2.93
Mordecai and Rigby help Muscle Man learn about etiquette in order to impress Starla and her parents at a fancy restaurant. Song: "The Four Seasons: Spring, 1st Movement (Allegro)" by Antonio Vivaldi; Guest voices: Courtenay Taylor as Starla
73	33	"Diary"	Robert Alvarez	Andres Salaff and Madeline Queripel	July 23, 2012	1009-075	2.63
Mordecai and Rigby accidentally break the lock on Margaret's diary, so they try to fix it.
74	34	"The Best VHS in the World"	Robert Alvarez	Calvin Wong and Toby Jones	July 30, 2012	1009-079	2.78
Mordecai and Rigby have to find and return an overdue VHS tape from the Movie Shack Hut to maintain their membership there. Guest voices: Roger Craig Smith as the Movie Shack Hut's employee and Armin Shimerman as Buttonwillow McButtonwillow
75	35	"Prankless"	Robert Alvarez	Benton Connor and Hilary Florido	August 6, 2012	1009-078	2.93
Muscle Man vows to never prank again after Pops is inadvertently injured when his recent prank goes awry. Because of this, the rival park resumes a prank war against them. Guest voices: Kurtwood Smith as Gene
76	36	"Death Bear"	Robert Alvarez	Sean Szeles and Kat Morris	August 13, 2012	1009-077	2.80
Mordecai, Rigby, Margaret and Eileen venture into an abandoned zoo to take a picture outside of the cage of a killer bear.
77	37	"Fuzzy Dice"	Robert Alvarez	Andres Salaff and Madeline Queripel	August 20, 2012	1009-080	2.63
The group has to win one million tickets at a disgraced arcade to get a pair of fuzzy dice for Pops' birthday. Song: "Don't You (Forget About Me)" by Simple Minds
78	38	"Sugar Rush"	Robert Alvarez	Benton Connor and Hilary Florido	August 27, 2012	1009-069	2.70
Mordecai and Rigby have to pick up doughnuts for the morning meeting. When they get incredibly sugary ones that Pops soon consumes, it is up to them and Skips to solve the problem.
79	39	"Bad Kiss"	Robert Alvarez	Sean Szeles and Kat Morris	September 3, 2012	1009-063	2.17
Mordecai and Margaret finally share a kiss, only for it to be cut short due to Mordecai's bad breath. Extremely embarrassed, he and Rigby go back in time to set things right.

== Home media ==
Warner Home Video released multiple DVDs, consisting of Region 1 formats. The Best DVD in the World *At this Moment in Time, Party Pack, Fright Pack, Mordecai & Margaret Pack, Rigby Pack, and Mordecai Pack were created for Region 1 markets containing episodes from the third season.

=== Full season release ===
The full season set was released on DVD on June 17, 2014.

Regular Show: The Complete Third Season
Set details			Special features	
40 episodes; 3-disc set; 1.78:1 aspect ratio; English (Dolby Stereo); Subtitles: English			Episode commentaries; Four things you didn't know about J.G.; J.G. answers why; Characters come to life: live episode read	
Release dates
Region 1	Region 2	Region 4	Region A	Region B
June 17, 2014	N/A	July 9, 2014	N/A	N/A
