= Regular Show season 5 =

Regular Show
- Season 5
- Australian DVD cover
- Showrunner: J. G. Quintel
- Starring: J. G. Quintel; William Salyers; Sam Marin; Mark Hamill; Roger Craig Smith
- No. of episodes: 37

Release
- Original network: Cartoon Network
- Original release: September 2, 2013 – August 14, 2014

Season chronology
- ← Previous; Season 4 Next → Season 6

The fifth season of the American animated comedy television series Regular Show, created by J. G. Quintel, originally aired on Cartoon Network in the United States. Quintel created the series' pilot using characters from his comedy shorts for the canceled anthology series The Cartoonstitute. He developed Regular Show from his own experiences in college. Simultaneously, several of the show's main characters originated from his animated shorts 2 in the AM PM and The Naïve Man from Lolliland. Following its fourth season's success, Regular Show was renewed for a fifth season on November 1, 2012. The season ran from September 2, 2013, to August 14, 2014, and was produced by Cartoon Network Studios.

For this season, the writers were Quintel, Mike Roth, John Infantino, Sean Szeles, Michele Cavin, and Matt Price.

The season aired with the first episodes, "Laundry Woes" and "Silver Dude." The season contains a half-hour Halloween special entitled "Terror Tales of the Park III" that aired on October 21, 2013, a half-hour Thanksgiving episode titled "The Thanksgiving Special" that aired on November 25, 2013, and a half-hour episode centered on Skips titled "Skips' Story" that aired on April 14, 2014.

== Development ==
=== Concept ===
Two 23-year-old friends, a blue jay named Mordecai and a raccoon named Rigby, are employed as groundskeepers at a park and spend their days trying to slack off and entertain themselves by any means. This is much to the chagrin of their boss Benson and their coworker Skips, but the delight of Pops. Their other coworkers, Muscle Man (an overweight green man) and Hi-Five Ghost (a ghost with a hand extending from the top of his head) serve as their rivals.

=== Production ===
Many of the characters are loosely based on those developed for Quintel's student films at California Institute of the Arts: The Naive Man From Lolliland and 2 in the AM PM. Quintel pitched Regular Show for Cartoon Network's Cartoonstitute project, in which the network allowed artists to create pilots with no notes to be optioned as a show possibly. After The Cartoonstitute was scrapped, and Cartoon Network executives approved the greenlight for Regular Show, production officially began on August 14, 2009. After being green-lit, Quintel recruited several indie comic book artists to compose the show's staff, as their style matched close to what he desired for the series. For this season, the writers were Quintel, Mike Roth, John Infantino, Sean Szeles, Michele Cavin, and Matt Price, who is also the story editor while being produced by Cartoon Network Studios.

The fifth season of Regular Show was produced between October 2012 and August 2013. It utilizes double entendres and mild language; Quintel stated that, although the network wanted to step up from the more child-oriented fare, some restrictions came with this switch.

== Episodes ==
No. overall	No. in season	Title	Directed by	Written and storyboarded by	Original release date	Prod. code	U.S. viewers (millions)
117	1	"Laundry Woes"	Robert Alvarez (animation)	Hilary Florido and Madeline Queripel	September 2, 2013	1017-123	2.12
After nearly recovering from a broken heart, Mordecai embarks on a road trip to Margaret's college to return her sweater, taking Rigby along, who wishes for Mordecai to move on, but a hallucination of Margaret gets the better of him.
118	2	"Silver Dude"	Robert Alvarez (animation)	Sarah Oleksyk and Owen Dennis	September 2, 2013	1017-130	2.12
Mordecai and Rigby try street-performing to earn extra money quickly for a video game, but soon compete with another street performer who uses their act to his advantage. Guest voices: John Cygan as Silver Dude and Wayne Knight as God of Street Performing
119	3	"Benson's Car"	Robert Alvarez (animation)	Calvin Wong and Minty Lewis	September 9, 2013	1017-124	2.10
When Mordecai and Rigby break the window in Benson's car, they have to get it fixed before he finds out. Guest voices: John Cygan as Bring'Em Back Jack, Roger and Cop.
120	4	"Every Meat Burritos"	Robert Alvarez (animation)	Owen Dennis and Sarah Oleksyk	September 16, 2013	1017-125	2.46
Mordecai, Rigby, Muscle Man, and Hi-Five Ghost strive to get Every Meat Burritos, a new special type of burrito, from the Jimbros' Burritos Drive-Thru. Guest voices: Lex Lang as Barry
121	5	"Wall Buddy"	Robert Alvarez (animation)	Calvin Wong and Minty Lewis	September 23, 2013	1017-129	2.12
Rigby buys a device that unfairly divides his share of the room to avoid cleaning his mess in it.
122	6	"A Skips in Time"	Robert Alvarez (animation)	Calvin Wong and Toby Jones	September 30, 2013	1017-131	1.94
After a time-traveling tornado sends an 18th-century Skips to the present, Mordecai and Rigby have to help present Skips return his teenage self to his time or else he will die.
123	7	"Survival Skills"	Robert Alvarez (animation)	Minty Lewis	October 14, 2013	1017-134	1.87
Mordecai and Rigby become lost in the wilderness after retrieving tortillas that they had initially forgotten to bring for the group's trip.
124	8	"Terror Tales of the Park III" (Note: This is a half-hour episode.)	Robert Alvarez (animation)	Calvin Wong and Toby Jones, Benton Connor and Andres Salaff ("The Previous Owner" only)	October 21, 2013	1017-121; 1017-122	2.29
The group makes a bet over who can tell the scariest story at their Halloween party. • "Killer Bed" – Rigby purchases a bed that turns out actually to be a transformed local murderer. • "Jacked-Up Jack-o-Lantern" – Mordecai, Rigby, Muscle Man, and Hi-Five Ghost end up in trouble after smashing the wrong pumpkins. • "The Previous Owner" – Mordecai, Rigby, Muscle Man, Hi-Five Ghost, and Pops make a bet over who can stay the night in the house the longest after being told by Benson that the previous owner's ghost is going to return.
125	9	"Tants"	Robert Alvarez (animation)	Hilary Florido and Madeline Queripel	November 4, 2013	1017-133	2.07
Pops gives Mordecai and Rigby tants– pants that double as tables– which they pretend to like. But when the duo accidentally ruin the tants, they try to fix them so they don't hurt Pops' feelings.
126	10	"Bank Shot"	Robert Alvarez (animation)	Owen Dennis and Sarah Oleksyk	November 11, 2013	1017-135	1.99
Rigby has to beat a challenger at a bank shooting arcade game. Song: Air on the G String by Johann Sebastian Bach; Guest voices: Julian Dean as Don, Carl Weathers as the Basketball King and Phil LaMarr as Cash Bankis
127	11	"Power Tower"	Robert Alvarez (animation)	Benton Connor and Andres Salaff	November 18, 2013	1017-136	2.09
Muscle Man wants to win a bodybuilding competition at his gym. Guest voices: David Sobolov as Dale; Note: The episode’s first airing had a coloring error that was later fixed in later reruns.
128	12	"The Thanksgiving Special"	J. G. Quintel and Mike Roth; Robert Alvarez (animation)	Calvin Wong, Toby Jones, Benton Connor, and Andres Salaff	November 25, 2013	1017-126; 1017-127	3.04
Mordecai and Rigby accidentally ruin Thanksgiving and have to fix it before their families arrive for dinner. Songs: "Chewing On Freedom" by Jeniffer, Auto T and Dusty B and "What Are You Thankful For? (Thanksgiving)" by Mordecai and Rigby; Guest voices: Terry Crews as Brock Stettman, Chord Overstreet as Dusty B., LeToya Luckett as Jennifer, and Josh Keaton as Auto T.
129	13	"The Heart of a Stuntman"	Robert Alvarez (animation)	Calvin Wong and Minty Lewis	December 2, 2013	1017-137	2.03
Mordecai, Rigby, Muscle Man, and Hi-Five Ghost try to get stuntman licenses so they can perform for Timmy's stuntman-themed birthday party. Guest voices: Bobcat Goldthwait as Johnny Crasher
130	14	"New Year's Kiss"	Robert Alvarez (animation)	Hilary Florido and Madeline Queripel	December 31, 2013	1017-128	1.84
Rigby tries to stop Mordecai from kissing a girl named Tracy on New Year's Eve. Guest voices: Linda Cardellini as C.J. and Ali Hillis as Tracy
131	15	"Dodge This"	Robert Alvarez (animation)	Benton Connor and Andres Salaff	January 13, 2014	1017-132	2.05
The park workers want to win a dodgeball tournament, but Mordecai becomes distracted when he discovers that C.J. is on one of the opposing teams.
132	16	"Portable Toilet"	Robert Alvarez (animation)	Toby Jones and Owen Dennis	January 27, 2014	1017-138	1.89
Mordecai and Rigby get stuck in a portable toilet at the park after Mordecai takes a dare from C.J. Guest voices: Tim Russ as Sergeant and Helicopter Pilot, Mark Deklin as Corporal and Rhomeyn Johnson as General
133	17	"The Postcard"	Robert Alvarez (animation)	Hilary Florido and Madeline Queripel	February 10, 2014	1017-144	1.89
Hi-Five Ghost hopes to reunite with a lady from his past after receiving a long-awaited postcard from her. Guest voices: Zosia Mamet as Celia
134	18	"Rigby in the Sky with Burrito"	Robert Alvarez (animation)	Hilary Florido and Madeline Queripel	February 24, 2014	1017-139	1.85
With his high school reunion arriving, Rigby tries to accomplish skydiving while eating a burrito, a task he claimed he would do before attending the reunion. Guest voices: Steven Weber as Jumpin' Jim
135	19	"Journey to the Bottom of the Crash Pit"	Robert Alvarez (animation)	Benton Connor and Sarah Oleksyk	March 3, 2014	1017-140	1.48
The park workers have to venture into the bottom of the crash pit to find their video camera before Benson notices it is gone.
136	20	"Saving Time"	Robert Alvarez (animation)	Andres Salaff and Ryan Pequin	March 10, 2014	1017-146	1.86
Mordecai and Rigby play a prank on Daylight Saving Time by setting all of the clocks in the park at the wrong time, which leads to disastrous results.
137	21	"Guitar of Rock"	Robert Alvarez (animation)	Andres Salaff and Ryan Pequin	March 17, 2014	1017-141	2.05
Benson has to replace an electric guitar signed by a rockstar or he will be fired by Mr. Maellard.
138	22	"Skips' Story"	Robert Alvarez (animation)	Calvin Wong and Minty Lewis	April 14, 2014	1017-147; 1017-152	2.72
Skips tells Mordecai and Rigby the story of how he became immortal. Songs: "Forever Young" by Alphaville and "Just Can't Get Enough" by Depeche Mode; Guest voices: Grey DeLisle as Mona
139	23	"Return of Mordecai and the Rigbys"	Robert Alvarez (animation)	Calvin Wong and Minty Lewis	April 21, 2014	1017-142	2.67
Mordecai and Rigby revive their band with the rest of the group and compete in a battle of the bands to win an air conditioner during a massive heatwave.
140	24	"Bad Portrait"	Robert Alvarez (animation)	Owen Dennis and Toby Jones	April 28, 2014	1017-143	1.96
After an important portrait of Benson is ruined, Mordecai attempts to repaint it before it is awarded to him. Guest voices: Chris Cox as Benny Harris
141	25	"Video 101"	Robert Alvarez (animation)	Benton Connor and Sarah Oleksyk	May 5, 2014	1017-145	2.14
Mordecai, Rigby, and C.J. help Eileen make a music video for her college filmmaking class.
142	26	"I Like You Hi"	Robert Alvarez (animation)	Toby Jones and Owen Dennis	May 12, 2014	1017-148	N/A
Mordecai ponders over his feelings towards C.J. after he sends an auto-corrected text message to her saying that he likes her. Guest voices: Rich Fulcher as the Keepers of the Voicemail
143	27	"Play Date"	Robert Alvarez (animation)	Hilary Florido and Madeline Queripel	June 5, 2014	1017-149	2.12
Mordecai has a date with C.J., but he unfortunately also has to babysit Death's 300-year-old son, Thomas. Guest voices: Michael Dorn as Thomas
144	28	"Expert or Liar"	Robert Alvarez (animation)	Benton Connor and Sarah Oleksyk	June 12, 2014	1017-150	1.73
Rigby is humiliated on the game show Expert or Liar, so he sets off with Benson to redeem himself by locating the show's host and making another appearance.
145	29	"Catching the Wave"	Robert Alvarez (animation)	Calvin Wong and Minty Lewis	June 19, 2014	1017-157	1.86
Pops strives to learn how to surf in order to reconnect with nature after having a bad day with it. Song: "Wipe Out" by The Surfaris
146	30	"Gold Watch"	Robert Alvarez (animation)	Andres Salaff and Ryan Pequin	June 26, 2014	1017-151	2.11
Benson's chance of winning a gold watch at the park is jeopardized when he eats too many buffalo wings. Guest voices: Liam O'Brien as Tango and Travis Willingham as Stash
147	31	"Paint Job"	Robert Alvarez (animation)	Toby Jones and Owen Dennis	July 3, 2014	1017-153	1.90
Mordecai and Rigby have to repaint the park house after throwing pizza pouches at it and ruining its paint job while cleaning it.
148	32	"Take the Cake"	Robert Alvarez (animation)	Hilary Florido and Madeline Queripel	July 10, 2014	1017-154	2.18
Mordecai and Rigby have to bake a cake for Mr. Maellard's surprise birthday party after the original cake is ruined. Song: Flower Duet by Léo Delibes
149	33	"Skips in the Saddle"	Robert Alvarez (animation)	Benton Connor and Sarah Oleksyk	July 17, 2014	1017-155	1.68
Skips tries to find his soul mate on a dating show after seeing how happy everyone else is in a relationship.
150	34	"Thomas Fights Back"	Robert Alvarez (animation)	Andres Salaff and Ryan Pequin	July 24, 2014	1017-156	2.00
Thomas tries to prove his worth by retrieving the park founder's statue.
151	35	"Bachelor Party! Zingo!!"	Robert Alvarez (animation)	Toby Jones and Owen Dennis	July 31, 2014	1017-159	1.89
The park workers help Skips throw a bachelor party for his cousin Quips.
152	36	"Tent Trouble"	Robert Alvarez (animation)	Hilary Florido and Madeline Queripel	August 7, 2014	1017-160	1.79
Mordecai accidentally destroys C.J.'s brand new tent and needs help fixing it before she realizes he did it. Song: "Takin' Care of Business" by Bachman–Turner Overdrive
153	37	"Real Date"	Robert Alvarez (animation)	Calvin Wong and Minty Lewis	August 14, 2014	1017-158	1.85
Mordecai and C.J. want to go on a romantic date.
