= Regular Show season 2 =

Regular Show
- Season 2
- Showrunner: J. G. Quintel
- Starring: J. G. Quintel; William Salyers; Sam Marin; Mark Hamill
- No. of episodes: 28

Release
- Original network: Cartoon Network
- Original release: November 29, 2010 – August 1, 2011

Season chronology
- ← Previous; Season 1 Next → Season 3

The second season of the animated television series Regular Show, created by J. G. Quintel, originally aired on Cartoon Network in the United States. Quintel created the series' pilot using characters from his comedy shorts for the canceled anthology series The Cartoonstitute. He developed Regular Show from his own experiences in college. Simultaneously, several of the show's main characters originated from his animated shorts 2 in the AM PM and The Naïve Man from Lolliland. Following its first season's success, Regular Show was renewed for a second season in 2009, ahead of its premiere. The season ran from November 29, 2010, to August 1, 2011, and was produced by Cartoon Network Studios.

== Development ==
=== Concept ===
Two 23-year-old friends, a blue jay named Mordecai and a raccoon named Rigby, are employed as groundskeepers at a park and spend their days trying to slack off and entertain themselves by any means. This is much to the chagrin of their boss Benson and their coworker Skips, but the delight of Pops. Their other coworkers, Muscle Man (an overweight green man) and Hi-Five Ghost (a ghost with a hand extending from the top of his head) serve as their rivals.

=== Production ===
Many of the characters are loosely based on those developed for Quintel's student films at California Institute of the Arts: The Naive Man From Lolliland and 2 in the AM PM. Quintel pitched Regular Show for Cartoon Network's Cartoonstitute project, in which the network allowed artists to create pilots with no notes to be optioned as a show possibly. After The Cartoonstitute was scrapped, and Cartoon Network executives approved the greenlight for Regular Show, production officially began on August 14, 2009. After being green-lit, Quintel recruited several indie comic book artists to compose the show's staff, as their style matched close to what he desired for the series. For this season, the writers were Mike Roth, John Infantino, Jack Thomas, and Matt Price, who is also the story editor while being produced by Cartoon Network Studios.

The second season of Regular Show was produced between August 2010 to November 2010. It utilizes double entendres and mild language; Quintel stated that, although the network wanted to step up from the more child-oriented fare, some restrictions came with this switch.

== Episodes ==
No. overall	No. in season	Title	Animation direction by	Written and storyboarded by	Original release date	Prod. code	U.S. viewers (millions)
13	1	"Ello Gov'nor"	Robert Alvarez	Sean Szeles and Shion Takeuchi	November 29, 2010	1004–014	2.07
Rigby becomes traumatized and fearful after he and Mordecai watch a vintage British horror film about a possessed taxi. Guest voice: Paul F. Tompkins as the employee at the Movie Shack Hut video rental shop
14	2	"It's Time"	Robert Alvarez	Benton Connor and Calvin Wong	January 3, 2011	1004–015	N/A
Mordecai feels jealous when Rigby impresses Margaret for a date to see an upcoming film. Desperate to prevent this date from happening, he destroys all the clocks in the house by putting them into the microwave. In the process of the fight, Rigby is killed and Mordecai is introduced to Father Time, who takes him back to the beginning of the episode to fix what he did wrong. Guest voice: Alan Sklar as Father Time
15	3	"Appreciation Day"	Robert Alvarez	Kat Morris and Paul Scarlata	January 10, 2011	1004–013	1.72
After Mordecai and Rigby write false information in the park's record book, it begins to affect reality.
16	4	"Peeps"	Robert Alvarez	Benton Connor and Calvin Wong	January 17, 2011	1004–019	N/A
Benson purchases a surveillance system to keep Mordecai and Rigby from constantly slacking off. Guest voice: Richard McGonagle as Peeps
17	5	"Dizzy"	Robert Alvarez	Sean Szeles and Shion Takeuchi	January 24, 2011	1004–018	2.10
Pops has to prepare a speech at The Park to unveil the new park statue. Mordecai and Rigby try to help by making him go dizzy, but they have to go into his head to restore his confidence. Guest voice: David Ogden Stiers as Mr. Maellard
18	6	"My Mom"	Robert Alvarez	Kat Morris	January 31, 2011	1004–017	1.83
Mordecai and Rigby fail to do another task, so Benson has Muscle Man and Hi-Five Ghost supervise them. Mordecai and Rigby hate having to put up with Muscle Man and Hi-Five Ghost, especially the former's "My Mom" jokes. Song: "Nothin' but a Good Time" by Poison Guest voices: Steve Blum as John and Tommy Lister Jr. as Bobby
19	7	"High Score"	Lindsey Pollard	Sean Szeles	February 7, 2011	1004–024	N/A
Mordecai and Rigby try to earn respect by beating the world record on an arcade video game recently installed at the Coffee Shop. Once they do, they face off against the record's holder, Garret Bobby Ferguson. Song: "Hangin' Tough" by New Kids on the Block
20	8	"Rage Against the TV"	Robert Alvarez	J. G. Quintel, Mike Roth, and John Infantino	February 14, 2011	1004–020	1.85
After their television set breaks down, Mordecai and Rigby try looking for a replacement to beat the difficult final boss of a video game. Still, the boss soon becomes real by combining electronics, forcing the group to work together and defeat him by using the furniture. Guest voice: Roger Craig Smith as Jimmy
21	9	"Party Pete"	Robert Alvarez	Benton Connor and Calvin Wong	February 21, 2011	1004–025	1.72
When Benson takes the night off, Mordecai and Rigby decide to throw a party with the help of a hard-partying celebrity named Party Pete. Still, the celebrity takes the idea too far after an overconsumption of antique soda. Guest voice: Jeff Bennett as Party Pete
22	10	"Brain Eraser"	Robert Alvarez	Kat Morris	February 25, 2011	1004–021	0.91
When Mordecai accidentally sees Pops nude after he had taken a shower, Rigby, and later Skips, tries to help him forget about it. Guest voice: Roger Craig Smith as the employee at the Movie Shack Hut
23	11	"Benson Be Gone"	Robert Alvarez	John Infantino	February 28, 2011	1004–016	1.87
A new park manager replaces Benson after he gets demoted to working alongside Mordecai and Rigby, but this new manager is revealed to be a demon and causes everyone to transform into doppelgängers of her. Now it is up to Benson to save the day. Guest voices: Steven Blum as Leon and April Stewart as Susan
24	12	"But I Have a Receipt"	Robert Alvarez	Kat Morris and Minty Lewis	March 7, 2011	1004–028	1.75
Mordecai and Rigby try to get a refund on their role-playing game after realizing how bad it is, but the manager refuses to let this happen. This causes both sides to go to war to see who is right about the case. Guest voice: Roger Craig Smith as the game store manager
25	13	"This Is My Jam"	Robert Alvarez	Sean Szeles	March 28, 2011	1004–027	1.52
Rigby struggles to get a repetitive song from his youth out of his head, which quickly turns into a problem for the whole group when it takes on a physical form. Song: "Summertime Loving, Loving in the Summer (Time)" by Sean Szeles
26	14	"Muscle Woman"	Robert Alvarez	Benton Connor and Calvin Wong	April 4, 2011	1004–029	1.42
Muscle Man becomes depressed when his girlfriend, Starla, breaks up with him, which causes Mordecai and Rigby to do his work for him. The duo have to find a way to bring Muscle Man and Starla back together. Guest voice: Courtenay Taylor as Starla
27	15	"Temp Check"	Brian Sheesley	Benton Connor and Calvin Wong	April 11, 2011	1004–031	1.69
Rigby hires a temp to do his work at the park, only to discover that he is a wanted fugitive who begins to steal Rigby's identity. When it reaches the boiling point, the group are stuck dealing with two Rigbys which they must put an end to by identifying the imposter. Guest voice: Roger Craig Smith as Doug "The Doppelganger" Shablowski
28	16	"Jinx"	Robert Alvarez and Brian Sheesley	Sean Szeles and Henry Yu	April 18, 2011	1004–032	1.70
Rigby falls victim to being jinxed by Mordecai and tries to remove it from himself but fails each time, until Muscle Man tells Rigby to do it in a mirror which unleashes a demon, raising the stakes and forcing Mordecai to unjinx him. Guest voice: Roger Craig Smith as Ybgir
29	17	"See You There"	Robert Alvarez and Brian Sheesley	J. G. Quintel	April 25, 2011	1004–022	1.74
Mordecai and Rigby try to get to Muscle Man's surprise birthday party for Hi-Five Ghost after not being invited due to a choking incident but soon learn the truth about it after various attempts. Guest voices: Roger Craig Smith as Low-Five Ghost and Tiny Lister as Bobby
30	18	"Do Me a Solid"	Robert Alvarez and Brian Sheesley	Kat Morris and Minty Lewis	May 2, 2011	1004–030	2.04
Mordecai asks Rigby to go on a date with Eileen to double date with Mordecai and Margaret. Rigby agrees in exchange for Mordecai owing him ten favors, which he uses during the date to spoil Mordecai's moves towards Margaret, but it becomes deadly at the last favor.
31	19	"Grave Sights"	Robert Alvarez and Brian Sheesley	Benton Connor and Calvin Wong	May 9, 2011	1004–035	1.93
Mordecai and Rigby accidentally raise the dead during a movie night-based fundraising event held in the park's former cemetery and must protect the audience watching the film that is being shown. Guest voices: Roger Craig Smith as the Movie Shack Hut employee and Jeff Bennett as the zombies and the protagonist of Zombocalypse 3D
32	20	"Really Real Wrestling"	Robert Alvarez and Brian Sheesley	Sean Szeles	May 16, 2011	1004–034	2.16
After accidentally injuring Pops’ back, Mordecai and Rigby sneak out of the house to go to a wrestling event they were initially going to attend with him. To their surprise, they find out that he has snuck out too and is mistaken for a wrestler at the event. Guest voices: Lee Reherman as Four-Armageddon and Robin Atkin Downes as Huge Head
33	21	"Over the Top"	Robert Alvarez and Brian Sheesley	Benton Connor and Calvin Wong	May 23, 2011	1004–036	1.96
Skips cannot figure out how Rigby can beat him at arm wrestling and soon discovers the truth and unbelievably murders him. He has to beat the undead presence of Death in an arm-wrestling match to save Rigby's life. Song: "Dies Irae" by Wolfgang Amadeus Mozart Guest voice: Julian Holloway as Death
34	22	"The Night Owl"	Robert Alvarez and Brian Sheesley	Kat Morris and Minty Lewis	May 30, 2011	1004–033	2.11
Mordecai, Rigby, Muscle Man, and Hi-Five Ghost enter a competition to win a car, but the host of the contest plans to keep them in it forever. The four have to try to escape before being iced into the future past year 4224. Guest voices: Roger Craig Smith as The Night Owl, Nick and intercom announcements at the former's museum in the future
35	23	"A Bunch of Baby Ducks"	Robert Alvarez and Brian Sheesley	Kat Morris and Minty Lewis	June 6, 2011	1004–037	2.33
Baby ducks become attached to Rigby and start imitating his behavior.
36	24	"More Smarter"	Robert Alvarez and Brian Sheesley	Benton Connor and Calvin Wong	June 13, 2011	1004–039	2.19
Rigby purchases a drink online that increases a person's intelligence to prove to Mordecai that he is more intelligent than him. Still, they both became too intelligent for their own good.
37	25	"First Day"	Robert Alvarez	J. G. Quintel	July 11, 2011	1004–040	2.63
In a prequel episode set on their first day at the park, Mordecai and Rigby compete against each other over Pops' old chair by playing rock-paper-scissors, but it is revealed to be an evil game when they tie 100 times in a row, spawning a portal-absorbing monster intent on eating the sofa. Song: "I'm Alright" by Kenny Loggins Guest voice: Roger L. Jackson as the portal-absorbing monster Note: This episode is an extended version of the series' pilot episode, which was redone for this season.
38	26	"Go Viral"	Robert Alvarez and Brian Sheesley	Benton Connor and Calvin Wong	July 18, 2011	1004–026	2.01
Mordecai and Rigby compete against Muscle Man and Hi-Five Ghost to see who can make a viral video with the most views. but it leads the duo to accidentally send Pops to a strange place ruled by an evil warden. Song: "Hit Me with Your Best Shot" by Pat Benatar Guest voice: Mitzi McCall as The Warden of the Internet
39	27	"Skunked"	Robert Alvarez and Brian Sheesley	J. G. Quintel and Sean Szeles	July 25, 2011	1004–023	2.14
Rigby starts transforming into a skunk after being sprayed by a mythical creature called the Were-Skunk and tries to return to normal before it is too late, but the creature is determined to keep this from happening. Guest voice: Paul F. Tompkins as The Were-Skunk
40	28	"Karaoke Video"	Robert Alvarez	Sean Szeles and Dennis Messner	August 1, 2011	1004–038	2.26
Mordecai and Rigby must dispose of videotaped evidence of them insulting their friends at a karaoke bar while caught up in the excitement of performing there, but it proves to be very difficult when the group gets involved as well and the bar's manager is ignorant of their protests against playing it as a promotional video. Songs: "We're Not Gonna Take It" by Twisted Sister and "Footloose" by Kenny Loggins Guest voice: Richard McGonagle as Carrey O'Key, the karaoke bar's manager

== Home media ==
Warner Home Video released multiple DVDs, consisting of region 1 formats. Slack Pack, The Best DVD in the World *At this Moment in Time, Party Pack, Fright Pack, Mordecai & Margaret Pack and Rigby Pack were created for Region 1 markets containing episodes from the second season.

=== Full season release ===
The Complete First & Second Seasons was released on Blu-ray and DVD on July 16, 2013.

Regular Show: The Complete First & Second Seasons
Set details			Special features	
40 episodes; 2-disc set (Blu-ray) 3-disc set (DVD); 1.78:1 aspect ratio; Subtitles: English; English (Dolby Stereo)			Episode commentaries; Deleted scenes; The Naive Man from Lolliland student short; CG Test for Hodgepodge Monster; Hot Topic interview; Pops character reading by Sam Marin; Original drawings of the main characters; Original Post-it used to pitch Regular Show; Unaired "Regular Show" pilot; Sam Marin singing Blitzkrieg Bop; J. G. pitches "The Power"; Animatic for the unaired pilot; Animatic for "The Power"; Pencil test drawings; Comic-Con 2010 teaser trailer; Party Tonight music video; Original Regular Show commercials	
Release dates
Region 1	Region 2	Region 4	Region A	Region B
July 16, 2013	N/A	The Complete First Season: October 2, 2013; The Complete Second Season: November 6, 2013	July 16, 2013	November 6, 2013
