= Regular Show season 1 =

Season of television series

Regular Show
- Season 1
- Blu-ray cover
- Showrunner: J. G. Quintel
- Starring: J. G. Quintel; William Salyers; Sam Marin; Mark Hamill
- No. of episodes: 12

Release
- Original network: Cartoon Network
- Original release: September 6 – November 22, 2010

Season chronology
- Next → Season 2

The first season of the American animated sitcom Regular Show, created by J. G. Quintel, originally aired on Cartoon Network in the United States. Quintel created the series' pilot using characters from his comedy shorts for the canceled anthology series The Cartoonstitute. He developed Regular Show from his own experiences in college. Simultaneously, several of the series' main characters originated from his animated short films The Naïve Man from Lolliland and 2 in the AM PM. The season's production officially began in 2009, was produced by Cartoon Network Studios and ran from September 6 to November 22, 2010.

== Development ==
=== Concept ===
Two 23-year-old friends, a blue jay named Mordecai and a raccoon named Rigby, are employed as groundskeepers at a park and spend their days trying to slack off and entertain themselves by any means. This is much to the chagrin of their boss Benson and their coworker Skips, but the delight of Pops. Their other coworkers, Muscle Man (an overweight green man) and Hi-Five Ghost (a ghost with a hand extending from the top of his head), serve as their rivals.

=== Production ===
Many of the characters are loosely based on those developed for Quintel's student films at California Institute of the Arts: The Naive Man From Lolliland and 2 in the AM PM. Quintel pitched Regular Show for Cartoon Network's Cartoonstitute project, in which the network allowed artists to create pilots with no notes to be optioned as a show possibly. After The Cartoonstitute was scrapped, and Cartoon Network executives approved the greenlight for Regular Show, production officially began on August 14, 2009. After being green-lit, Quintel recruited several indie comic book artists to compose the show's staff, as their style matched close to what he desired for the series.

The first season of Regular Show was produced between November 2009 to April 2010. It utilizes double entendres and mild language; Quintel stated that, although the network wanted to step up from the more child-oriented fare, some restrictions came along with this switch.

=== Broadcast ===
The whole season aired in the same time slot on Mondays at 8:15 p.m. on Cartoon Network.

== Cast ==
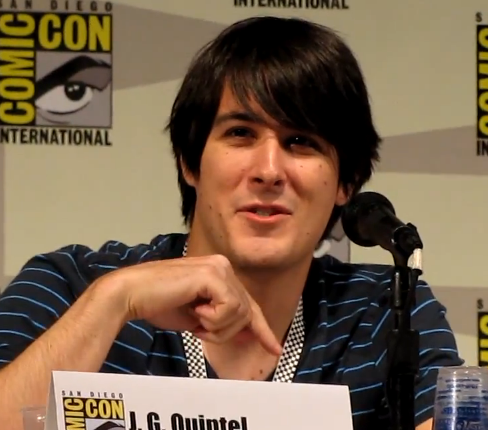
J. G. Quintel, the creator of the show and voice of Mordecai and Hi-Five Ghost, based the show off his student films produced at CalArts

The voice actors include Quintel (as Mordecai and Hi-Five Ghost) and William Salyers (as Rigby). Quintel states that the writing crew tries to "come up with dialogue that sounds conversational and not too cartoony so that the characters are more relatable." In addition, Sam Marin voices Pops, Benson, and Muscle Man, Mark Hamill voices Skips, and Jeff Bennett voices Hi-Five Ghost in one episode only.

The character of Mordecai embodies Quintel during his college years, specifically at CalArts: "That's that time when you're hanging out with your friends and getting into stupid situations, but you're also taking it seriously enough." The character of Rigby developed randomly when Quintel drew a raccoon hula-hooping on a Post-It. He liked the design and developed the character of Rigby to be a jerk character who is far more irresponsible than his companion.

== Reception ==
The season generally received positive reviews from most critics, gaining a Metascore—a weighted average based on the impression of critical reviews—of 76 percent. Critics enjoyed the risque and adult innuendos and humor, as well as the animation style and voice acting.

== Episodes ==
No. overall	No. in season	Title	Animation direction by	Written and storyboarded by	Original release date	Prod. code	U.S. viewers (millions)
1	1	"The Power"	Robert Alvarez and Brian Sheesley	J. G. Quintel	September 6, 2010	697–003	2.10
While Mordecai and Rigby are wrestling with a doll, they accidentally make a hole in the wall. Using a magical keyboard that can do whatever they want, the duo decide to convince their boss Benson to give them raises so they can hire someone to fix the hole. After this works, Rigby accidentally uses the keyboard to send his coworker Skips to the Moon. Mordecai, Rigby, Benson, and park owner Pops pile into a golf cart and use the keyboard to travel to the Moon to rescue Skips. There, the group find Skips being chased by a giant monster resembling a mixture of Mordecai, Rigby and the doll they were wrestling. Rigby distracts the monster and allows Skips to break free from its grip, using the keyboard to return the group back home.
2	2	"Just Set Up the Chairs"	Robert Alvarez and Brian Sheesley	Sean Szeles and Shion Takeuchi	September 13, 2010	697–004	1.90
In the midst of a children's birthday party, the park groundskeepers are instructed by Benson to help prepare. In order to prove to him that they are competent, Mordecai and Rigby agree to set up the chairs but end up distracted when they find a set of arcade games while searching the missing remainder of them. When Rigby discovers an arcade game called "Destroyer of Worlds" that is in disrepair, he inadvertently causes its titular character to spawn in reality, whereupon it begins going on a rampage throughout the park. With help from Skips, the duo create a giant and arcade graphics-like robot designed to combat the Destroyer, and Rigby uses his excessive button mashing to vanquish the monster and save the day.
3	3	"Caffeinated Concert Tickets"	Robert Alvarez and Brian Sheesley	J. G. Quintel and Mike Roth	September 20, 2010	697–001	1.72
Mordecai and Rigby learn that a band named Fist Pump will be playing live at a concert venue named Slammers. Being Rigby's favorite band, Rigby attempts to persuade Mordecai to join him at the concert. Initially reluctant, Mordecai agrees to go after he learns that his crush Margaret will be in attendance. The duo manage to convince Benson to give them overtime to pay for tickets, but after learning that only V.I.P. tickets are available, the duo are assisted by a giant coffee bean and its translator in order to stay awake while completing more chores. After successfully gaining the tickets, the bean betrays the duo and steals them, instigating a grueling chase to Slammers. After regaining their tickets, Mordecai learns that Margaret has a boyfriend as he and Rigby fall asleep, missing the entire concert. Song: "Working for the Weekend" by Loverboy; Guest voice: S. Scott Bullock as the giant coffee bean
4	4	"Death Punchies"	Robert Alvarez and Brian Sheesley	J. G. Quintel, Mike Roth, and Jake Armstrong	September 27, 2010	697–007	1.98
Rigby steals instructions from "Death Kwon Do" on how to perform a powerful punching move to beat Mordecai in Punchies, which he always loses. However, it backfires when Mordecai discovers his secret and uses a block move to counter the punch. Song: "You're the Best" by Joe Esposito
5	5	"Free Cake"	Robert Alvarez and Brian Sheesley	Kat Morris and Paul Scarlata	October 4, 2010	697–011	2.10
Developing a craving for cake, Mordecai and Rigby plan to throw a surprise birthday party for Skips so they can eat some at it, but realize their accident botches Skips' ritual to stay immortal. Guest voices: Robin Atkin Downes as Gary and David Kaye as the Guardians of Eternal Youth
6	6	"Meat Your Maker"	Robert Alvarez and Brian Sheesley	Sean Szeles and Shion Takeuchi	October 11, 2010	697–012	1.87
Mordecai and Rigby become trapped in the park's meat locker while searching for some substitute hot dogs for the annual barbecue after the latter ignorantly wastes a pack recently purchased by Benson. They meet a group of anthropomorphic hot dogs who agree to help them, but soon reveal ulterior motives of eating them instead to avenge their kind. Guest voice: Tim Curry as the leader of the anthropomorphic hot dogs, a visual gag on the actor’s roles as Dr Frank-N-Furter.
7	7	"Grilled Cheese Deluxe"	Robert Alvarez and Brian Sheesley	Sean Szeles and Shion Takeuchi	October 18, 2010	697–008	2.16
Mordecai and Rigby mistakenly eat Benson's grilled cheese sandwich, which had been instigated by the latter so he could get a rise out of him, and are sent out to get another one. They then compete to see who can lie better, which quickly gets them into more trouble with a pair of astronauts that they try to impress. Song: "Lies" by The Thompson Twins; Guest voices: Scott MacDonald as Major Williams, James Sie as Jimmy and B. J. Ward as Doctor Asinovskovich
8	8	"The Unicorns Have Got to Go"	Robert Alvarez and Brian Sheesley	Kat Morris and Paul Scarlata	October 25, 2010	697–005	2.42
Mordecai inadvertently attracts a group of delinquent unicorns after foolishly using a falsely-advertised cologne in an attempt to get Margaret's attention.
9	9	"Prank Callers"	Robert Alvarez and Brian Sheesley	J. G. Quintel, Mike Roth, and Kent Osborne	November 1, 2010	697–009	2.10
Mordecai and Rigby are sent back in time to 1982 after attempting to prank call their prank-calling idol, The Master Prank Caller. Guest voice: Tim Curry, who provides some of the Master Prank Caller's lines.
10	10	"Don"	Robert Alvarez and Brian Sheesley	Benton Connor, Kat Morris, and J. G. Quintel	November 8, 2010	697–006	2.09
The park is under audit and Rigby's accountant brother Don, who is taller-in-size but younger-in-age, is called to help rescue it from financial ruin. Don proves to be very popular with the crew, much to Rigby's annoyance. His refusal to take in Don's "sugar" (a strong-hearted hug) drives him away and allows the audit to occur on schedule, forcing Rigby to reconcile his differences to his brother. Guest voice: Julian Dean as Don
11	11	"Rigby's Body"	Robert Alvarez and Brian Sheesley	J. G. Quintel and Mike Roth	November 15, 2010	697–002	1.93
When Rigby's body forces his consciousness out of itself following an overconsumption of junk food, Mordecai and Skips try to recover it before the change becomes permanent as a bodybuilder's consciousness becomes intent on claiming the body. Guest voice: Jeff Bennett as the bodybuilder
12	12	"Mordecai and the Rigbys"	Robert Alvarez and Brian Sheesley	Sean Szeles and Shion Takeuchi	November 22, 2010	697–010	2.03
After Mordecai and Rigby foolishly pass themselves off as a real band, their future selves miraculously appear to help them out. However, they discover that it is a hoax, resulting in them ending the band and, in turn, causing their future selves to disappear. Song: "Party Tonight" by Sean Szeles, sung by Mordecai; Guest voice: Paul F. Tompkins as the voice on Pops' "How To Be A Musician – with Sir Geoffrey" instructional records

== Home media ==
Warner Home Video released multiple DVDs, consisting of region 1 formats. Slack Pack, Party Pack, Fright Pack, Mordecai & Margaret Pack and Rigby Pack were created for Region 1 markets containing episodes from the first season.

=== Full season release ===
The Complete First & Second Seasons was released on Blu-ray and DVD on July 16. 2013.

Regular Show: The Complete First & Second Seasons
Set details		Special features	
40 episodes; 2-disc set (Blu-ray) 3-disc set (DVD); 1.78:1 aspect ratio; English (Dolby Stereo); Subtitles: English		Episode commentaries; Deleted scenes; "The Naïve Man from Lolliland" student short; CG Test for Hodgepodge Monster; Hot Topic interview; Pops character reading by Sam Marin; Original drawings of the main characters; Original Post-it used to pitch Regular Show; Unaired "Regular Show" pilot; Sam Marin singing Blitzkrieg Bop; J. G. pitches "The Power"; Animatic for the unaired pilot; Animatic for "The Power"; Pencil test drawings; Comic-Con 2010 teaser trailer; Party Tonight music video; Original Regular Show commercials	
Release dates
Region 1	Region 2	Region 4	Region A
July 16, 2013	October 6, 2014	October 2, 2013	July 16, 2013
