= SpongeBob's Big Birthday Blowout =

2019 television film directed by Sherm Cohen

- Also known as: SpongeBob and the Big Birthday Blowout
- Based on: SpongeBob SquarePants by Stephen Hillenburg
- Written by: Kaz; Mr. Lawrence
- Directed by: Jonas Morganstein
- Starring: Tom Kenny; Bill Fagerbakke; Clancy Brown; Rodger Bumpass; Carolyn Lawrence; Mr. Lawrence; Jill Talley; Mary Jo Catlett; Lori Alan; Dee Bradley Baker; Kel Mitchell; Jack Griffo; Daniella Perkins; David Hasselhoff
- Narrated by: Tom Kenny
- Music by: Steve Belfer
- Country of origin: United States
- Original language: English

Production
- Executive producers: Stephen Hillenburg; Jonas Morganstein; Hema Mulchandani
- Producers: Jennie Monica; Sofia Iza
- Editor: Rick Weis
- Running time: 44 minutes
- Production companies: United Plankton Pictures; Nickelodeon Animation Studio

Original release
- Network: Nickelodeon; Nicktoons
- Release: July 12, 2019

SpongeBob's Big Birthday Blowout is a 2019 made-for-television live-action/animated comedy special for the animated television series SpongeBob SquarePants. It was written by Kaz and Mr. Lawrence, and was directed by Jonas Morganstein. The special, produced as part of the show's twelfth season, originally aired on Nickelodeon in the United States on July 12, 2019, celebrating the series' twentieth anniversary. The cut version of this episode was released on October 5, 2019. The bonus edition of this episode was released on July 17, 2020, exactly 21 years after the official series premiere in 1999.

The television series follows the adventures of SpongeBob SquarePants (voiced by Tom Kenny) in the underwater city of Bikini Bottom. In the special, the citizens of Bikini Bottom plan a surprise birthday party for SpongeBob, while he and Patrick Star (voiced by Bill Fagerbakke) tour the surface world and come across their real-life selves. The live-action portions of the special also feature several guest stars including Kel Mitchell, Jack Griffo, Daniella Perkins, and David Hasselhoff, the latter of whom starred as himself in The SpongeBob SquarePants Movie. The special is dedicated to the memory of the SpongeBob creator Stephen Hillenburg, who died in 2018. Upon release, it received generally positive reviews.

== Plot ==
In Encino, California, Patchy the Pirate attempts to get to Bikini Bottom to give SpongeBob SquarePants his birthday present. Down in Bikini Bottom, Sandy Cheeks gathers Patrick Star, Old Man Walker, Mr. Krabs, Mrs. Puff, Bubble Bass, and Plankton to orchestrate a plan to get SpongeBob's house keys and decorate his house, starting with Patrick. Patrick and SpongeBob board a tour bus going to the surface, with help landing by the French Narrator.

At SpongeBob's house, an argument occurs about the Birthday theme. Sandy gives everyone (now joined by Squidward Tentacles) a decision to divide the themes. The party goes through full swing, but chaos ensues and the house starts falling apart. Meanwhile, on the surface, the tour bus encounters many strange sights and unexpected obstacles, including a bean-themed event at the beach, a dog playing fetch at a park, an office filled with employees in gorilla masks, a restaurant called the Trusty Slab (based on Bikini Bottom's own Krusty Krab) with human counterparts of the show's main cast played by their voice actors, and a fish store that the bus is mistakenly placed in.

Patrick pushes the tour bus to the other side, escaping with the other fish, and the group is able to return to the ocean. In Bikini Bottom, SpongeBob discovers his destroyed house and thanks everyone for celebrating his birthday, when a box falls out of the sky. The box is revealed to be Patchy's head, congratulating SpongeBob, leading SpongeBob's friends to sing a birthday song reminiscent of the opening theme with different celebrities congratulating him. As the song finishes, Patrick asks SpongeBob how old he is, just to be interrupted by static. The episode ends by showing a dedication card reading "Thank you, Steve Hillenburg."

== Cast ==
=== Voices ===
- Tom Kenny as SpongeBob SquarePants, Old Man Walker, Gary, French Narrator, SpongeBob's Dad, Slappy, Grubby Grouper, PA System
- Bill Fagerbakke as Patrick Star, Bus Passenger, Passenger, Patron #1
- Rodger Bumpass as Squidward Tentacles, Bus Passenger, Announcer, Yellow Fish
- Clancy Brown as Eugene Krabs, Unhappy Guy, Party Guest #2
- Carolyn Lawrence as Sandy Cheeks, Bus Passenger, Little Girl
- Mr. Lawrence as Sheldon Plankton, Larry the Lobster, Potty the Parrot, Rube, Fred
- Jill Talley as Karen
- Lori Alan as Pearl
- Dee Bradley Baker as Bubble Bass, Dog, Alarm Clock, Cow
- Mary Jo Catlett as Mrs. Puff
- Sirena Irwin as SpongeBob's Mom, Gawky Female, The Kid
- Frank Caeti as Gorilla Boss
- Ephraim López as Monkey Middle Manager
- Cory DeMeyers as Monkey Middle Manager
- Lana McKissack as Monkey Middle Manager
- Sydney Olson as Monkey Middle Manager

=== Live-action cast ===
- Tom Kenny as Patchy the Pirate, JimBob
- Bill Fagerbakke as Patrick
- Rodger Bumpass as Manward
- Clancy Brown as Mr. Slabs
- Carolyn Lawrence as Carol
- Mr. Lawrence as Charleston
- Jill Talley as Office Middle Management
- Lori Alan as Pet Shop Woman
- Dee Bradley Baker as Bald Guy
- Sirena Irwin as Office Worker
- David Hasselhoff as himself
- Kel Mitchell as Beans McBeans, himself
- Dahlya Glick as Can
- Jack Griffo as Contestant
- Daniella Perkins as Contestant
- JoJo Siwa as herself
- Tiffany Haddish as herself
- Thomas F. Wilson as Dog Walker, Himself
- Sigourney Weaver as herself
- Heidi Klum as herself
- Kal Penn as himself
- Lana Condor as herself (original airings)
- John Goodman as himself (alternate airings)
- Jason Sudeikis as himself
- RuPaul as himself
- Vernon Davis as himself
- Rob Gronkowski as himself
- Ethan Slater as himself
- Danny Skinner as himself
- Lilli Cooper as herself
- Gilbert Gottfried as himself

== Broadcast and reception ==
=== Viewership ===
SpongeBob's Big Birthday Blowout premiered on July 12, 2019, simultaneously across Nickelodeon, and Nicktoons. The three-network premiere was collectively viewed by 2.2 million people in the United States, and it posted year-to-year gains for the network across multiple demographics, most notably, kids ages 2–11 (3.3/797K, +57%). The special's premiere date is notable for taking place five days before the 20th anniversary of the series' official premiere, which took place on July 17, 1999.

It aired in other territories on July 12 and July 13, 2019, Tom Kenny's 57th birthday.

=== Reception ===
Verne Gay from Newsday gave the episode 3.5 out of 4 stars, describing it as "[f]un, funny, and funky".

== See also ==
- SpongeBob's Truth or Square
