= Morgan Evans (screenwriter) =

American screenwriter, director and producer

- Occupations: Screenwriter, director, producer
- Years active: 2008–present
- Notable work: Teen Titans Go!

Morgan Evans is an American screenwriter, television writer, director, and producer, known for writing the Warner Bros. Animation film Merry Little Batman and the Cartoon Network series Teen Titans Go!.

== Career ==
Evans began his career directing videos at the Upright Citizens Brigade Theatre, including early web episodes of Broad City and It Gets Betterish. In 2012, while working at The Onion, he created The Untitled Web Series That Morgan Evans Is Doing, which was critically acclaimed and named one of the best web series of 2012 by IndieWire. The series was later nominated for a Writers Guild Award.

In 2013, Evans worked as a staff writer for the reboot of Best Week Ever and later that year, he joined MTV to write, host, and produce the Teen Wolf After After Show. In July 2014, MTV announced they had picked up a second, eight-episode, season of The Untitled Web Series That Morgan Evans Is Doing. For his performance, Evans received a Cynopsis Digital Media award.

In 2022, Evans began writing for the Cartoon Network series Teen Titans Go! and wrote Merry Little Batman for Warner Bros. Animation. The film premiered on December 8, 2023, on Amazon Prime Video. Evans focused on exploring the relationship between Bruce Wayne and his son, Damian, in the film. It received a 95% approval rating on Rotten Tomatoes ahead of its release.

In August 2023, Evans' feature film Driftwood was canceled following the Warner Brothers Discovery merger, three months after being greenlit.

In September 2024 it was announced that Evans had written and directed the upcoming comedy film Micro Budget starring Bobby Moynihan and Chris Parnell.

== Filmography ==
=== Film ===
Year	Title	Role	Notes
2023	Merry Little Batman	Writer	
2024	Micro Budget	Director, writer, producer	

=== Television ===
Year	Title	Role	Network	Notes
2011	The Onion News Network	Segment Producer	IFC	
2012	The Untitled Webseries That Morgan Evans Is Doing	Writer/Director	MTV	Nominated–Writers Guild Award (2013)
2014–2017	Teen Wolf After Show	Writer/Host	MTV	
2016	Scream After Dark	Writer	MTV	
2016	Syfy Presents Live From Comic Con	Head Writer	SyFy	
2016	Legendary Dudas	Director	Nickelodeon	
2017	Truth & Iliza	Segment Producer	Freeform	
2018	The Fix	Field Director	Netflix	
2018	Liza on Demand	Writer	YouTube Premium	
2020	Celebrity Show-Off	Producer	TBS	
2020–2021	Earth to Ned	Field Producer	Disney+	
2021–2022	Fast Foodies	Senior Producer	TruTv	
2022	Snack vs. Chef	Senior Producer	Netflix	
2022–present	Teen Titans Go!	Writer	Cartoon Network	
