= Legendary Dudas =

American comedy television series

- Genre: Comedy
- Created by: Kevin Jakubowski
- Starring: Theodore Barnes; DeVion Harris
- Composer: Frank Ciampi
- Country of origin: United States
- Original language: English
- No. of seasons: 1
- No. of episodes: 6

Production
- Executive producers: Sharla Sumpter-Bridgett; Kevin Jakubowski
- Producer: Brian Owen
- Running time: 22 minutes
- Production companies: Sumpter Bridgett Productions; Nickelodeon Productions

Original release
- Network: Nickelodeon
- Release: July 9 – August 13, 2016

Legendary Dudas is an American comedy television series created by Kevin Jakubowski that aired on Nickelodeon from July 9 to August 13, 2016. The series stars Theodore Barnes and DeVion Harris.

== Premise ==
Kids' relationships can be tested at times when they don't get a break from their siblings, which is why going to school often provides a welcome break from spending time with each other. That reprieve is taken away from the Duda brothers, 11-year-old Sam and 12-year-old Tyler, when the younger brother unexpectedly skips a grade and ends up in Tyler's seventh-grade homeroom. That changes things at Fenski Middle School when the brothers -- who are very different from each other -- are put in the same classroom. As they go on adventures with their friends, the Duda brothers realize that, despite their differences, they always look out for each other..

== Cast ==
=== Main ===
- Theodore Barnes as Sam Duda
- DeVion Harris as Tyler Duda

=== Recurring ===
- Jackson A. Dunn as Elmer
- Mylo Gosch as Neiderprum
- Pearce Joza as Logan
- Dallas Liu as Carter
- Meyrick Murphy as Dallas
- Daniella Perkins as Sophia
- Megan Richie as Gigi
- Laura Harman as Miss Tolomeo
- Kelly Perine as Principal Platt

== Production ==
The series, which was previously titled Homeroom and The Dudas, was picked up by Nickelodeon in March 2016.

== Episodes ==
No.	Title	Directed by	Written by	Original release date	Prod. code	U.S. viewers (millions)
1	"The Worst Best Day Ever"	Ben Pluimer	Kevin Jakubowski	July 9, 2016	101	1.00
Guest stars: Jackson A. Dunn as Elmer, Mylo Gosch as Neiderprum, Pearce Joza as Logan, Dallas Liu as Carter, Meyrick Murphy as Dallas, Daniella Perkins as Sophia, Megan Richie as Gigi, Laura Harman as Miss Tolomeo, Kelly Perine as Principal Platt
2	"The Great Cricket Caper"/"Carpe Duda"	Lauren Palmigiano; Ben Pluimer	Nate Federman; Patrice Asuncion & Nick Rossitto	July 16, 2016	102	1.14
"The Great Cricket Caper" guest stars: Jackson A. Dunn as Elmer, Mylo Gosch as Neiderprum, Dallas Liu as Carter, Meyrick Murphy as Dallas, Megan Richie as Gigi, Laura Harman as Miss Tolomeo, Kelly Perine as Principal Platt "Carpe Duda" guest stars: Mylo Gosch as Neiderprum, Pearce Joza as Logan, Meyrick Murphy as Dallas, Daniella Perkins as Sophia, Megan Richie as Gigi, Kelly Perine as Principal Platt
3	"Blazing Pedals"/"The Chest Hair"	Morgan Evans; Ben Pluimer	Nate Federman; Dave Ihlenfeld & David Wright	July 23, 2016	104	0.90
"Blazing Pedals" guest stars: Mylo Gosch as Neiderprum, Pearce Joza as Logan, Dallas Liu as Carter, Meyrick Murphy as Dallas, Daniella Perkins as Sophia, Megan Richie as Gigi "The Chest Hair" guest stars: Pearce Joza as Logan, Dallas Liu as Carter, Meyrick Murphy as Dallas, Daniella Perkins as Sophia, Megan Richie as Gigi, Kelly Perine as Principal Platt
4	"King Sam"/"Karate Kids"	Ben Pluimer; Morgan Evans	Dave Ihlenfeld & David Wright; Laura House	July 30, 2016	103	1.09
"King Sam" guest stars: Mylo Gosch as Neiderprum, Pearce Joza as Logan, Dallas Liu as Carter, Meyrick Murphy as Dallas, Daniella Perkins as Sophia, Megan Richie as Gigi, Jack De Sena as Wizard Waiter "Karate Kids" guest stars: Jackson A. Dunn as Elmer, Mylo Gosch as Neiderprum, Pearce Joza as Logan, Dallas Liu as Carter, Meyrick Murphy as Dallas, Daniella Perkins as Sophia, Megan Richie as Gigi
5	"Un Film de Duda"/"Homeroom Wars"	Ben Pluimer; Todd Sklar	Nate Federman; Dave Ihlenfeld & David Wright	August 6, 2016	106	0.87
"Un Film de Duda" guest stars: Jackson A. Dunn as Elmer, Pearce Joza as Logan, Dallas Liu as Carter, Meyrick Murphy as Dallas, Daniella Perkins as Sophia, Megan Richie as Gigi, Laura Harman as Miss Tolomeo "Homeroom Wars" guest stars: Jackson A. Dunn as Elmer, Dallas Liu as Carter, Meyrick Murphy as Dallas, Daniella Perkins as Sophia, Megan Richie as Gigi, Davis Cleveland as Icuzio, Kelly Perine as Principal Platt
6	"The Fenski Fun Fair"/"Club Gigi"	Lauren Palmigiano; Todd Sklar	Patrice Asuncion & Nick Rossitto; Ally Musika	August 13, 2016	105	1.15
"The Fenski Fun Fair" guest stars: Mylo Gosch as Neiderprum, Meyrick Murphy as Dallas, Megan Richie as Gigi, Elisha Henig as Payton Bolas "Club Gigi" guest stars: Jackson A. Dunn as Elmer, Mylo Gosch as Neiderprum, Meyrick Murphy as Dallas, Daniella Perkins as Sophia, Megan Richie as Gigi

== Ratings ==
Viewership and ratings per season of Legendary Dudas
Season	Episodes	First aired		Last aired		Avg. viewers (millions)
Season	Episodes	Date	Viewers (millions)	Date	Viewers (millions)	Avg. viewers (millions)
1	6	July 9, 2016	1.00	August 13, 2016	1.15	1.03
