= Daniella Taylor =

American actress

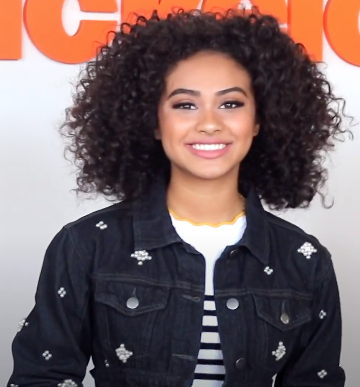
- Taylor in 2018
- Born: Anaheim, California, U.S.
- Other name: Daniella Orion Taylor
- Occupation: Actress
- Years active: 2008–present

Daniella Perkins, also known artistically as Daniella Taylor, is an American actress and internet personality. She gained prominence through her main role in the Nickelodeon series Knight Squad (2018–2019). She has since appeared in the Freeform series Grown-ish (2021–2024).

== Early life ==
Daniella Taylor was born at the Anaheim Regional Medical Center to a white teen mother who raised Daniella and her younger sister, Devenity, as a single mother. Her father is African-American. She grew up in Orange County, California. As children, Perkins and her sister put on plays for their own amusement. She was homeschooled to make time for her career.

== Career ==
Taylor attempted creating a YouTube channel at 11 with her sister. In 2008, they began a fashion, location, and restaurant review website WzTheBuzz and went on to officially launch it as a business in 2011. Taylor created a Musical.ly around 2015 and has since gained over 1.8 million followers on TikTok. In addition, her YouTube channel has over 750,000 subscribers.

Taylor decided to pursue acting professionally in her early teens. Her first venture was with Devenity in the 2014 short film Senior Slasher. She made her television debut with a guest role on Girl Meets World in 2016.

Taylor began working with Nickelodeon in 2016, playing the recurring role of Sophie in the series Legendary Dudas. She starred as Ciara in the Nickelodeon series Knight Squad from 2018 to 2019, a role she reprised in a crossover episode of Henry Danger. She voiced Winnie in Middle School Moguls. She also made guest appearances in a number of Nickelodeon series, participated in reality series, and appeared in the 2016 television film, Blurt.

Taylor starred as the titular role in the 2019 Brat web series Red Ruby.

== Filmography ==
=== Film ===
Year	Title	Role	Notes
2014	Senior Slasher		Short film
2017	Del Playa	Sara	
2023	Deltopia	Rachel	
2024	Suncoast	Laci	

=== Television ===
Year	Title	Role	Notes
2016	Hopefuls	McKayla	Pilot
2016	Girl Meets World	Zoe	Episode: "Girl Meets She Don't Like Me"
2016	Legendary Dudas	Sophie	6 episodes
2017	Nickelodeon's Ultimate Halloween Haunted House	Herself	TV special
2018	The Thundermans	Cheyanne	Episode: "Rhythm n' Shoes"
2018	Blurt	Milly Turkel	TV film
2018–2019	Knight Squad	Ciara	Main role
2018	Nicky, Ricky, Dicky & Dawn	Jade	Episode: "Quadbusters"
2019	Middle School Moguls	Winnie	Main voice role; miniseries
2019	Henry Danger	Ciara	Episode: "Knight & Danger"
2019	The Carpe Challenge: Chicago	Herself	Main role; miniseries
2019	Drop That Seat	Herself	Main role
2019	SpongeBob SquarePants	Contestant	TV special: "SpongeBob's Big Birthday Blowout"
2021–2024	Grown-ish	Kiela Hall	Recurring role (season 4); Main (seasons 5–6)

=== Web ===
Year	Title	Role	Notes
2019	Red Ruby	Ruby Balsey	Lead role
