= The Thanksgiving Special =

- Regular Show episode
- Title card
- Episode no.: Season 5 Episode 12
- Directed by: J. G. Quintel; Mike Roth
- Written by: Calvin Wong; Toby Jones; Benton Connor; Andres Salaff
- Story by: J. G. Quintel; Matt Price; Sean Szeles; Mike Roth; John Infantino; Michele Cavin
- Original air date: November 25, 2013
- Running time: 23 minutes

Guest appearances
- Terry Crews as Broc Stettman; Chord Overstreet as Dusty B; LeToya Luckett as Jennifer; Josh Keaton as Auto T

Episode chronology
← Previous "Power Tower"	Next → "The Heart of a Stuntman"
- Regular Show (season 5)

"The Thanksgiving Special" is the twelfth episode of the fifth season of the American animated television series Regular Show, as well as the 128th episode of the series overall. A Thanksgiving special, the episode aired on Cartoon Network on November 25, 2013.

The episode drew in 3.04 million viewers, making it the most viewed episode of the fifth season.

== Plot ==
Mordecai and Rigby have inadvertently ruined the preparations for the park's Thanksgiving dinner after playing football in the house. The other park workers resolve to revitalize it before their families arrive, while rejecting the duo's help. They then see a television advertisement for a songwriting competition where contestants must present a commemorative song for the holiday, with its prize being a turducken. Mordecai and Rigby decide to enter it, but quickly find that songwriting is not as simple as they think.

Meanwhile, Benson, Pops and Skips visit a grocery store to purchase another turkey and subsequently get into a fight with a trio of Thanksgiving enthusiasts over the last one in stock, which is eventually run over on the street. Muscle Man and High-Five Ghost go out to obtain more sides and end up in an end zone dance competition with football player Broc Stettman. All the while, Thomas goes to the airport to pick up the park workers' families. Mordecai and Rigby get caught in traffic and ride from Margaret's father via his helicopter. They arrive just in time to enter, still very unprepared, while the previous entry, in which billionaire Richard Buckner paid a group of professional singers to write and perform, is shown to be the clear favorite.

As Mordecai and Rigby are about to start, Thomas informs them that their families’ flights have been delayed to the following day. They decide to sing about how family and friends are more important, with Buckner's singers joining in, and win the competition, only for the billionaire to steal the turducken. The rest of the park workers, who had witnessed the live stream, decide to help reclaim it as their former adversaries join their cause. Mordecai and Rigby board Buckner's blimp, where he explains why he was after the turducken – it has a golden wishbone capable of wish fulfillment that he intends on using to gain the rights to Thanksgiving and be appreciated himself, much to their shock. The duo fight Buckner with help from their friends; however, they fall out of the blimp, but not before seizing the wishbone and replacing it with spoons. Buckner attempts to make his wish, only to discover his enemies' deception moments before the blimp crashes, killing him. Just when they are about to fall to their own deaths, Mordecai and Rigby wish to be returned home as they break the bone just in time. After being teleported back to the park, Thomas informs them he was mistaken about the flights being delayed – he had mistakenly checked the departure schedule instead of the arrivals, to everyone's frustration – and their families, along with Stettman and his team, the competition's organizer Farmer Jimmy, some of Buckner's singers and the enthusiasts, are already there and have revitalized the dinner. Benson gives Mordecai and Rigby a toast that praises them for saving the holiday as the episode culminates.

== Production ==
The episode was written and storyboarded by Benton Connor, Toby Jones, Andres Salaff, and Calvin Wong, and was directed by series creator J. G. Quintel and supervising producer Mike Roth. The episode includes guest stars Terry Crews, Chord Overstreet, LeToya Luckett and Josh Keaton. The episode also includes two original songs, "What Are You Thankful For?" and "Chewing on Freedom".

According to J. G. Quintel, the episode "[had] some really awesome songs", but the crew "ended up having to record the people in the songs all at separate times", which proved challenging.

The episode was watched by 3.04 million viewers.

== Reception ==
Alasdair Wilkins of The A.V. Club wrote that the special was "A worthy companion to last year’s brilliant Christmas special", complementing the special for "all the things associated with thanksgiving: food, football, good cheer, and most importantly family". Wilkins also complemented the family and friendship bonds throughout the show that the special has shown. Austin Allison from Collider placed the special as one of the "Top 10 Cartoon Thanksgiving Animated Specials to Gobble Down This Season", praising the special for managing to "ring in the true meaning of the holiday of being thankful for the ones closest to you, through song-form and hamboning."

Paul Le also placed the special as one of the "14 Best Thanksgiving Episodes in Animated Television, Ranked", stating that "Regular Show is always weird, but this Thanksgiving special takes the cake. Or should we say, "turkey?"".

== Cultural references ==
Stettman's football jersey resembles the jersey used by NFL team, the Pittsburgh Steelers, in the 1970s. A water tower seen during the episode bears the current logo of Cartoon Network on it a la the one at Warner Bros. Studios Burbank. The episode's main antagonist, Richard Buckner, is a parodic cross between businessman, television host and future President of the United States Donald Trump and Walmart and Sam's Club founder Sam Walton.
