= Bat-Fam =

American animated television series

- Genre: Superhero; Comedy; Animated sitcom
- Based on: Batman by: Bill Finger; Bob Kane
- Developed by: Mike Roth; Jase Ricci
- Showrunner: Mike Roth
- Voices of: Luke Wilson; Yonas Kibreab; James Cromwell; Haley Tju; London Hughes; Michael Benyaer; Bobby Moynihan
- Music by: Patrick Stump
- Country of origin: United States
- Original language: English
- No. of seasons: 1
- No. of episodes: 10

Production
- Executive producers: Mike Roth; Jase Ricci; Sam Register
- Editors: Andy Young; Oliver Akuin
- Production companies: DC Entertainment; Warner Bros. Animation; Amazon MGM Studios

Original release
- Network: Amazon Prime Video
- Release: November 10, 2025

Related
- Merry Little Batman (2023)

Bat-Fam is an American animated comedy superhero sitcom television series created by Mike Roth (a writer on Regular Show) and Jase Ricci, based on the DC Comics character Batman and produced by Warner Bros. Animation. The series is a follow-up to the film Merry Little Batman (2023). The series stars Luke Wilson, Yonas Kibreab, James Cromwell, Haley Tju, London Hughes, Michael Benyaer, and Bobby Moynihan. Roth serves as showrunner.

The series premiered on Amazon Prime Video on November 10, 2025.

== Plot ==
Following the events of Merry Little Batman, the series explores the lives of Bruce Wayne / Batman, Damian Wayne / Little Batman, and Alfred Pennyworth, alongside three new guests at Wayne Manor, as they explore life as a superhero family.

== Voice cast ==
=== Main cast ===
- Luke Wilson as Bruce Wayne / Batman: A vigilante from Gotham City and Damian's father
- Yonas Kibreab as Damian Wayne / Little Batman: Bruce's son
- James Cromwell as Alfred Pennyworth: The Wayne family's butler
- Haley Tju as Claire Selton: A former supervillain known as Volcana who was physically rejuvenated into a 12-year-old
- London Hughes as Alicia Pennyworth / Bright: Alfred's niece and a social worker and founder of the rehabilitation organization "E*Vil"
- Michael Benyaer as Ra's Al Ghul: Damian's grandfather and former leader of the League of Shadows, currently a haunting spirit in Wayne Manor
- Bobby Moynihan as Kirk Langstrom / Man-Bat: A scientist turned into a humanoid bat creature who lives in Wayne Manor's belfry

=== Recurring cast ===
- David Hornsby as The Joker
- Reid Scott as Commissioner Gordon
- Dolph Adomian as Mr. Freeze
- Cynthia McWilliams as Vicki Vale
- Diedrich Bader as Killer Moth
- Aristotle Athari as Mad Hatter
- Kevin Michael Richardson as Clayface, Police Officer
- Lori Alan as Livewire, Alarm, Warehouse Worker #2
- Natasha Leggero as Killer Frost
- Steve Blum as Killer Croc
- Fred Tatasciore as Solomon Grundy, King Tut, Giganta, Skaratata
- Kelly Hu as Rumbler/Ophelia
- Niccole Thurman as Cyclone/Poetry
- Natalie Palamides as Stella Tetch, Trudy Dent, Tour Guide, Janitor
- Kaitlyn Robrock as Copperhead
- Roger Craig Smith as Gubbub, Warehouse Worker #1
- Reese Lores as Judy Dent
- Kailen Jude as Toyman
- Jayla Lavender Nicholas as Young Alicia Pennyworth
- Haley Tju as Kelly Chen
- Isaac Bae as Paul Chen
- Andia Winslow as Lucky, Parademon Leader
- Izaac Wang as Goki-Freak
- Michael Benyaer as Mr. Singh, Custodian, Cashier
- Kari Wahlgren as Mrs. Trudeaux
- Andres Salaff as French Movie Actor

== Episodes ==
No.	Title	Directed by	Written by	Original release date
1	"Game Knight"	Sam Spina	Jase Ricci	November 10, 2025
As Bruce sets up a game night to welcome the new members of the Bat-Family, Claire is unsure of whether she belongs. When she suspects that Alicia might be evil after reading her texts with reformed villains, she and Damian team up to expose her.
2	"Bat-Trip"	Kat Morris	Han-Yee Ling	November 10, 2025
Damian teams up with Harvey Dent's twin daughters to infiltrate the stolen weapons room during a field trip to S.T.A.R. Labs, but have trouble sneaking off when Bruce forces his way along as a chaperone. Meanwhile, Alicia struggles to earn Selina's trust.
3	"90 Is the New 80"	Aleks Sennwald	Moujan Zolfaghari	November 10, 2025
Alfred finds himself unable to say no when Damian seeks his assistance in thwarting the Mad Hatter, and Bruce and Alicia compete to see who can treat him better on what they dub "Alfred Monday".
4	"All in a Bat's Day's Work"	Sam Spina	Shakira Pressley	November 10, 2025
On "Go to Work with a Grown-Up Day", Alicia shows Damian the inner workings of E*Vil, but Damian is suspicious of Mad Hatter's daughter, Sad Hatter. Meanwhile, Claire shadows Bruce at Wayne Enterprises, where they're caught in the middle of a heist by Clayface.
5	"A Knight at the Movies"	Kat Morris	Moujan Zolfaghari	November 10, 2025
Killer Croc's attempted heist on Wayne Enterprises interrupts family movie night. While thwarting him, Bruce confesses to Alicia that he's Batman, and she admits to being Bright, the vigilante who's shown up to help during the previous heists.
6	"The Art of Claire"	Aleks Sennwald	Libby Doyne	November 10, 2025
Feeling misunderstood as an artist, Claire bumps into her old friend, a seemingly reformed Killer Frost, who promises to give her art the reputation it deserves.
7	"Manbatman"	Sam Spina	Matt Price	November 10, 2025
When Gokifluff trading cards go missing, Damian recruits Man-Bat to help him stop the thief, after Batman and Bright deem the case too insignificant to stop themselves.
8	"Interview with a Batman"	Kat Morris	Matt Price	November 10, 2025
Bruce intends to make the family seem as perfect as possible when Vicki Vale comes to interview them at the manor. However, things get complicated when Alicia's clients move in due to water damage at E*vil's headquarters.
9	"April Fools! Part 1"	Aleks Sennwald	Libby Doyne	November 10, 2025
Batman and Bright finally manage to track down the Anti-Glow they've been searching for, just as E*vil's members are possessed and wreak havoc on Gotham. Claire and Damian take them down while the adults snag the Anti-Glow. Alfred confesses to a suspicious Damian that Bruce has been intentionally leaving him out of what's going on to protect him, prompting Damian to run away in anger. He is soon found by the Joker, who reveals that the Anti-Glow nabbed by the heroes was a fake and uses the real one to turn Damian into Joker Jr.
10	"April Fools! Part 2"	Sam Spina	Han-Yee Ling	November 10, 2025
Hijacking the airwaves, Joker and Joker Jr. plan to launch the Anti-Glow into space and possess all of Gotham, plunging it into chaos. Batman blocks everyone else from the Batcave and tries to stop him alone, but is captured and fails to undo Damian's possession. The rest of the Bat-Family manages to escape and joins him in the fight against several released supervillains. Batman tries to reason with his son, who reveals he was only pretending to be hypnotized and destroys the Jokers's satellite. Batman apologizes and trusts Damian with destroying the Anti-Glow, saving Gotham.

== Production ==
=== Development ===
In April 2023, it was reported that a series titled Bat-Family was in development at Amazon Prime Video, set to serve as a follow-up to the animated film Merry Little Batman (2023). Merry Little Batman director Mike Roth and writer Jase Ricci were set to executive-produce the series alongside Sam Register; with Roth and Ricci being credited as developers. The series started development alongside Merry Little Batman as an HBO Max series before the distribution rights were relinqueshed by the service and acquired by Amazon. Roth was confirmed to be the showrunner for the series in December 2023. By April 2025, the series had been retitled to Bat-Fam.

=== Writing ===
On December 25, 2023, Roth said the series would further explore the version of Gotham City featured in the film. He also revealed the series would feature characters and elements from the Batman comics that had to be dropped from Merry Little Batman.

=== Casting ===
In September 2025, it was confirmed that Luke Wilson, Yonas Kibreab, and James Cromwell would star in the series, reprising their roles from Merry Little Batman as Batman, Damian Wayne and Alfred Pennyworth, respectively, with Haley Tju, London Hughes, Michael Benyaer and Bobby Moynihan joining the main cast. Reid Scott, Kevin Michael Richardson, Diedrich Bader, and Natasha Leggero were also cast in undisclosed roles.

=== Animation ===
The series uses the same art style as Merry Little Batman, which was inspired by the works of Ronald Searle. Guillaume Fesquet returned from the film as art director.

== Release ==
Bat-Fam was released on November 10, 2025, on Amazon Prime Video. It was originally set for release on HBO Max. A behind-the-scenes look was held at the 2025 Annecy International Animation Film Festival, while an episode of the series premiered as a preview on the New York Comic Con 2025.

== Awards ==
Bat-Fam was nominated for Outstanding Achievement for Character Design in an Animated Television / Broadcast Production for Benjamin Tong for the episode "A Knight at the Movies" at the 53rd Annie Awards.
