= Middle School Moguls =

- Genre: Children's series; Action-adventure; Comedy; Fantasy
- Created by: Gina Heitkamp; Jenae Heitkamp
- Directed by: William Reiss
- Voices of: Laurie Hernandez; Daniella Perkins; Jade Pettyjohn; Haley Tju
- Country of origin: United States
- Original language: English
- No. of seasons: 1
- No. of episodes: 4

Production
- Executive producers: Gina Heitkamp; Jenae Heitkamp
- Producer: Louis J. Cuck
- Running time: 22 minutes
- Production companies: Gengirl Media; Nickelodeon Animation Studio

Original release
- Network: Nickelodeon
- Release: September 2 – September 29, 2019

Middle School Moguls is an American animated television miniseries created by Gina and Jenae Heitkamp. The series stars Laurie Hernandez, Daniella Perkins, Haley Tju and Jade Pettyjohn. The series premiered on September 2 on Nickelodeon, and aired through September 29, 2019. Gina and Jenae Heitkamp originally started the idea for the series as "a doll and book line" sold in Target stores in 2016, and they were contracted by Nickelodeon afterward.

== Plot ==
Mogul Academy is an entrepreneurial school where its students work to make their businesses come true. Four diverse female students: Valeria (Latina), Winnie (African-Caribbean), Yuna (Eurasian), and Celeste (White) work to establish their businesses and make them come true.

== Characters ==
=== Main ===
- Valeria (voiced by Laurie Hernandez) is a budding inventor of sports gear.
- Winnie (voiced by Daniella Perkins) is an aspiring chef of food for pets.
- Celeste (voiced by Jade Pettyjohn) is an inventor of "smart tech."
- Yuna (voiced by Haley Tju) is an aspiring LGBTQ+ interracial fashion designer who has two moms, one who is Asian and another who is White.

=== Guest stars ===
- Wren (voiced by Tim Gunn) is a professor at Mogul Academy who runs a fashion contest in the episode "Mo'gul Money, Mo Problems". They have been confirmed as a non-binary character. Wren is also the head of the school's fashion department.
- Victoria Steele (voiced by Jane Lynch) is the headmaster of Mogul Academy and former businesswoman.
- Josie (voiced by JoJo Siwa) as a communications business person and the head journalist for The Daily Juice, the school's blog.
- Finn (voiced by Ricardo Hurtado) is a student and athlete.
- Ethan (voiced by Alex Wassabi) is the Resident Advisor for the story's four protagonists.
- Kheris (voiced by Kheris Rogers) is a fashion mogul and a beautiful woman.
- Marci Stern (voiced by Nicole Sullivan) is the head of the athletic branch at the academy.
- Winnie's parents, Mrs. Pierre (voiced by Garcelle Beauvais) who is Haitian-American, and Mr. Pierre (voiced by Sean Patrick Thomas), who is also Haitian.

== Episodes ==
No.	Title	Directed by	Written by	Original release date	Prod. code	U.S. viewers (millions)
1	"The Making of a Mogul"	William Reiss	Adeline Colangelo	September 2, 2019	101	0.40
2	"Mo'gul Money, Mo Problems"	William Reiss	Emilia Resella-Howard	September 15, 2019	103	0.51
3	"Mogulize, and a Side of Fries"	William Reiss	Sarah Eisenberg & Becky Wangberg	September 22, 2019	102	0.73
4	"Mogul on a Mission"	William Reiss	Adeline Colangelo	September 29, 2019	104	0.58

== Reception ==
Emily Ashby of Common Sense Media described the show as likable and praised its "themes of diversity and perseverance." She also pointed out that the values of "thinking big and working hard" can apply to any situation, with any "failures" as an opportunity for success in the future as a major theme in the show, along with characters which challenge stereotypes. This includes, she argues, a female student is a "tech whiz," one character has two mothers, a non-binary teacher, and a new designer who draw inspiration from herself to "create fashion choices for body types that run the gamut," meaning that the show shares the message of "being unique, challenging stereotypes, and following your dreams." Producer, writer, and teacher Gina Catanzarite noted that show's scripts "are peppered with business terms," with the teenage characters using their skills to solve problems, and celebrates smart girls who "exhibit the skills, vision, and persistence" to achieve career goals.

== See also ==
- Secret Millionaires Club, another show which is also about businesses and has similar plots.
