= Merry Little Batman =

2023 animated superhero film

- Official release poster
- Directed by: Mike Roth
- Screenplay by: Morgan Evans; Jase Ricci
- Story by: Morgan Evans; Mike Roth
- Based on: Batman by: Bill Finger; Bob Kane
- Produced by: Rebecca Palatnik
- Starring: Yonas Kibreab; Luke Wilson; James Cromwell; David Hornsby
- Edited by: Andy Young
- Music by: Patrick Stump
- Production companies: Warner Bros. Animation; DC Entertainment
- Distributed by: Amazon MGM Studios (Note: Released through the Metro-Goldwyn-Mayer banner.)
- Release date: December 8, 2023
- Running time: 96 minutes
- Country: United States
- Language: English

Merry Little Batman is a 2023 American animated superhero comedy film directed by Mike Roth, and written by Morgan Evans and Jase Ricci, from a story by Evans and Roth, based on DC Comics featuring the characters Batman and his son Damian Wayne. It is the first Amazon MGM Studios animated production that was not produced, distributed through, or owned by Metro-Goldwyn-Mayer. The film stars the voices of Yonas Kibreab, Luke Wilson, James Cromwell, and David Hornsby. In the film, Damian must foil the Joker's plot to ruin Christmas in Gotham City while his father is away on a mission.

The film was released on December 8, 2023, on Amazon Prime Video, receiving positive reviews, with praise for its animation, story, and voice performances. A television series based on the film, titled Bat-Fam, premiered on November 10, 2025.

== Premise ==
After Damian Wayne is left alone in Wayne Manor on Christmas Eve, he transforms himself into "Little Batman" to safeguard his home and the rest of Gotham City from villains during the holiday season.

== Cast ==
- Yonas Kibreab as Damian Wayne / Little Batman
- Luke Wilson as Bruce Wayne / Batman
- James Cromwell as Alfred Pennyworth
- David Hornsby as The Joker, Fireman
- Dolph Adomian as Mr. Freeze, Annoyed man
- Brian George as The Penguin
- Therese McLaughlin as Poison Ivy, Hostage Woman, Concerned Citizen
- Chris Sullivan as Bane
- Cynthia McWilliams as Vicki Vale, Phone Operator, Angry Shopper, Bandleader
- Michael Fielding as Terry (one of Joker's minions)
- Natalie Palamides as Francine (one of Joker's minions), Shopper Mom
- Reid Scott as Commissioner Gordon
- Fred Tatasciore as Scarecrow, Santa, Crazy Man
- Bumper Robinson as Food Court Dad, Worried Man
- Courtenay Taylor as Kid Shopper, Worried Woman
- Isaac Robinson-Smith as Hostage Man, Store Clerk, Police Officer
- Roger Craig Smith as Flashback Cop

Additionally, late Batman comic book artist Carmine Infantino appears in a cameo via archive audio.

== Production ==
=== Development ===
While working on a movie project for Warner Bros. Animation as part of an overall deal, Mike Roth (formerly a supervising producer and director on Regular Show) was approached by Warner Bros. Animation vice-president Sammy Perlmutter to work on a Batman film set during Christmas inspired by the works of Ronald Searle. Having been a longtime fan of both Batman and Searle, Roth accepted directing the film, while Teen Titans Go! (2013–present) writer Morgan Evans was hired to work on the script.

In September 2021, it was reported that a Christmas animated film based on Batman and starring Damian Wayne, titled Merry Little Batman, was in development at Warner Bros. Animation for HBO Max and Cartoon Network. Roth was set to direct the film with Evans writing, while Sam Register and Roth would executive produce.

By August 2022, HBO Max had officially relinquished distribution rights for the film, alongside other six projects including Batman: Caped Crusader. The film would continue development as the studio searched for a new distributor; Warner allowed the film to continue production due to positive reception within the studio to the project, which had an animatic developed by then. In April 2023, it was reported that Amazon Prime Video – who previously acquired the rights for Caped Crusader – would distribute the film. By November 2023, Jase Ricci was hired as co-writer; Ricci previously wrote the script for Batman: The Doom That Came to Gotham (2023).

=== Writing ===
Originally, the film was set to center on Batman as a kid, but the writers decided to center on Damian instead, due to the film's Christmas setting. While the idea of featuring an older Damian who struggles between good and evil, as in the comics, was considered, the writers ultimately decided to portray him in a younger age because they felt the idea of a young Damian who wanted to be like his father "was such a fun starting point" that gave the filmmakers "the heart and comedy" they wanted for the film; the writer nevertheless incorporated elements of his internal struggles in the final film. Early drafts had Damian chasing after a toy that had been stolen from him, but Ricci suggested instead having the stolen item be a safety utility belt, as he felt going after the belt symbolized the character's desire to follow on Batman's footsteps. The writers also incorporated the "Bat-Dad" AI to serve as both a guide for Damian and to represent his desire to win his father's respect. Roth and Ricci drew inspiration from their own experience as fathers for Batman and Damian's relationships, with Batman having some "daddisms" the writers have in real life. The filmmakers cited Home Alone as an inspiration of the film, with early versions of the film being much more similar to that film.

The filmmakers wanted to "strategically [place]" tropes from Batman media in order to reflect Damian's growth, such as him trying and failing to use the Batmobile. Roth noted the scene at the zoo was meant to show Damian his father's perspective on crimefighting, while his letting go of the belt in the climax is meant to have Damian learn of the sacrifices that superheroes make for the common good. Regarding the film's humor, Roth said he wanted to avoid the comedy from getting "too zany" as to give it genuine stakes and so that the audience could believe Damian to be at genuine risk of dying, as well as to make the film approachable to all ages.

For the film's version of the Joker, the writers drew inspiration from Bob Fosse's performance as Snake in The Little Prince, describing him as "[the] perfect foe to a little kid because he is basically like a big, peevish child himself — coaxing, cunning, and apt to rapid and irrational tantrums". Evans said the film's version of the Joker "feels that what was great about the past wasn't so much committing crimes but doing it with his villain friends", which he described as "a metaphor for how nobody should be alone on the holidays". Poison Ivy, Mr. Freeze, and Bane were incorporated into the story due to Evans having been a fan of Batman & Robin (1997) growing up. The writers decided to exclude Catwoman early during development in order to focus on Damian's lineage; a cat named after the character's civilian identity was instead written into the film as a nod to the character.

=== Casting ===
In October 2023, Yonas Kibreab was reported to be voicing Damian Wayne, with Luke Wilson, James Cromwell, and David Hornsby cast in undisclosed roles; Wilson and Cromwell were confirmed to be voicing Bruce Wayne / Batman and Alfred Pennyworth, respectively, the following month. That same month, Hornsby was confirmed to be voicing the Joker, while Dolph Adomian, Brian George, Therese McLaughlin, Chris Sullivan, Michael Fielding, Cynthia McWilliams, Natalie Palamides, and Reid Scott were revealed to be appearing in the film as Mr. Freeze, The Penguin, Poison Ivy, Bane, Terry, Vicki Vale, Francine, and Commissioner Gordon, respectively.

On December 5, 2023, Roth revealed that the late Carmine Infantino, who was an artist on Batman comics during the 60s and 70s, would be appearing in the film as a cameo through archive audio. A nephew of Infantino's and longtime friend of Roth's gave him access to some interviews featuring Infantino, from which Roth selected an audio that he felt worked for a scene in the film.

=== Animation ===
Animation services were provided by Gigglebug in Helsinki and Doghead Animation in Florence. Guillaume Fesquet served as art director for the film; he worked alongside Daby Zainab Faidhi to develop the film's visual style, with Faidhi using her experience in architecture to help develop the backgrounds for the project.

In order for the art style to be reminiscent of Searle's work while still standing on its own, the artists wanted the film's style to be "illustrative and 'sketch'-like" to reflect Damian's mindset. For Damian's design, character designer Ben Tong wanted to preserve the character's "edge and desire to fight crime" while also changing his design to reflect his portrayal in the film; he also drew inspiration from Bill Watterson's Calvin and Hobbes. Tong wanted Batman's design to reflect both his charismatic personality and his more comedic depiction in the film. At Roth's behest, Tong had Alfred's design to be "very playful" and reflecting his old age, in contrast to most depictions of the character. For the Joker's design, Tong drew inspiration from the works of Christophe Blain. He also wanted his design to be more animalistic and with more exaggerated expressions in order to depict him as "over-dramatic".

=== Music ===
Patrick Stump composed the score for the film; he previously performed the song "Who's the (Bat)man" for The Lego Batman Movie (2017).

In addition to Stump's score, the film features several Christmas songs, including "All I Really Want for Christmas" by Lil Jon feat. Kool-Aid Man, "Father Christmas" by The Kinks, and "¿Dónde Esta Santa Claus?" by Augie Rios. Roth wanted "All I Want for Christmas" to play during a sequence in which Damian "[begins] to get all he really wants for Christmas" because he felt the song reflected his point-of-view during the scene.

== Release ==
Merry Little Batman was released on December 8, 2023, on Amazon Prime Video by Amazon MGM Studios. The film was previously set for release on HBO Max and Cartoon Network. Merry Little Batman is the 3rd DC Entertainment film not to be produced by Warner Bros., after Red 2 in 2013.

On February 2, 2023, James Gunn confirmed that animated productions are being released and labeled as DC Elseworlds.

The film was released on digital on November 15, 2024.

== Reception ==
The review aggregator Rotten Tomatoes reported an approval rating of 97%, based on 28 reviews, with an approval rating of 7.6/10.

== Awards ==
Award	Date of ceremony	Category	Recipient(s)	Result	Ref.
Annie Awards	February 17, 2024	Outstanding Achievement for Character Design in a Feature Production	Nikolas Ilić	Nominated	
Annie Awards	February 17, 2024	Outstanding Achievement for Voice Acting in a Feature Production	David Hornsby	Nominated	
Children's and Family Emmy Awards	March 15, 2025	Outstanding Animated Special	Merry Little Batman	Nominated	
Children's and Family Emmy Awards	March 15, 2025	Outstanding Editing for an Animated Program	Andy Young	Nominated	
Children's and Family Emmy Awards	March 15, 2025	Individual Achievement in Animation - Background Design	Philip Vose	Won	
Children's and Family Emmy Awards	March 15, 2025	Individual Achievement in Animation - Character Animation	Elena Najar	Won	
Children's and Family Emmy Awards	March 15, 2025	Individual Achievement in Animation - Production Design	Guillaume Fesquet	Won	

== Sequel ==
In April 2023, it was reported that a television series based on the film, titled Bat-Fam (formerly Bat-Family), was in development for Amazon Prime Video. The series will center on Batman, Alfred Pennyworth, Damian Wayne / Little Batman and "a few newcomers to Wayne Manor, as they navigate the fun and frustrations of life as a super family". Mike Roth will return as showrunner. The series debuted at Annecy on June 13, 2025, and premiered on November 10, 2025.

== See also ==
- List of Christmas films
