= Mike Roth (animator) =

American animator

- Education: School of Visual Arts
- Years active: 1999 – present
- Known for: Director, animator, writer, producer

Mike Roth is an American animator, writer, director, producer, and storyboard artist.

== Career ==
Roth written and storyboarded on a number of other animated shows including Cartoon Network's The Marvelous Misadventures of Flapjack, Disney Channel's Phineas and Ferb, Nickelodeon's SpongeBob SquarePants as well as Paramount Pictures' feature films The SpongeBob SquarePants Movie and Rugrats in Paris. He then served as a writer and producer on Cartoon Network's animated series Regular Show, for which he received multiple Emmy nominations (Outstanding Short-Format Animated Program 2015, 2014, & 2011) and won the Emmy in 2012 (Outstanding Short-Format Animated Program).

Most recently, he developed and directed the animated streaming feature Merry Little Batman, starring the iconic caped crusader, for Amazon. Prior to this role, Roth developed and supervised the development of several projects with Disney Television Animation. Roth was also the Co-Executive Producer of Cartoon Network's Emmy winning Artists Program where he was responsible for the development and production pipeline of their shorts. Several shorts under Mike's supervision went to series, including Craig of the Creek, Apple and Onion, Summer Camp Island, Victor and Valentino, Infinity Train, and more.

== Filmography ==
Television
Year	Title	Role	Notes
2001, 2008	SpongeBob SquarePants	Storyboard Artist	
2002	The Proud Family	Storyboard Artist	
2005-2006	Camp Lazlo	Storyboard Artist, Writer	Nominated for a 2006 Primetime Emmy for Outstanding Animated Program (for Programming Less Than One Hour).
2007-2008	Phineas and Ferb	Storyboard Artist, Writer	
2008-2009	The Marvelous Misadventures of Flapjack	Storyboard Artist, Writer	
2010-2015	Regular Show	Supervising Producer, Writer, Storyboard Artist	Nominated for 5 Primetime Emmys - four for Outstanding Short-Form Animated Program (2011, 2012, 2013, 2014) and once for Outstanding Animated Program (2014). Winner of the 2012 Primetime Emmy for Outstanding Short-Form Animated Program. Also nominated for two 2014 Annie Awards.
2014-2020	Cartoon Network Shorts Department	Supervising Producer, Co-Executive Producer	Shorts: Back to Backspace, Twelve Forever, Ridin’ With Burgess, Jammers, Apple & Onion, Summer Camp Island, Victor and Valentino, Infinity Train, Lasso & Comet, Bottom’s Butte, Craig of the Creek, Tiggle Winks, Legendary Place, Sunshine Brownstone, Splitting Time, The Wonderful Wingits, Mushroom and the Forest of the World (which was nominated for a 2020 Daytime Emmy for Outstanding Short Format Children's Programming), The Fancies, Cadette In Charge, Beetle+Bean and Wild Help.
2018	DIY	Co-Executive Producer	Miniseries
2025	Bat-Fam	Executive Producer	

Film
Year	Title	Role	Notes
2000	Rugrats in Paris: The Movie	Storyboard Artist, Layout Artist	
2001	The Wild Thornberrys Movie	Layout Artist	
2003	Rugrats Go Wild	Layout Artist	
2004	The SpongeBob SquarePants Movie	Storyboard Artist	
2015	Regular Show: The Movie	Supervising Producer	
2023	Merry Little Batman	Director, Executive Producer, Story	

Awards and Nominations
Year	Award	Category	Work	
2006	Primetime Emmy	Outstanding Animated Program	Camp Lazlo, "Hello Dolly"	Nominated
2011	Primetime Emmy	Outstanding Short-Form Animated Program	Regular Show, "Mordecai and the Rigbys"	Nominated
2012	Primetime Emmy	Outstanding Short-Form Animated Program	Regular Show, "Eggcellent"	Won
2013	Primetime Emmy	Outstanding Short-Form Animated Program	Regular Show, "A Bunch of Full Grown Geese"	Nominated
2013	Primetime Emmy	Outstanding Animated Program	Regular Show, "The Christmas Special"	Nominated
2014	Primetime Emmy	Outstanding Short-Form Animated Program	Regular Show, "The Last Laserdisc Player"	Nominated
2014	Annie Award	Best Animated TV/Broadcast Production for a Children's Audience	Regular Show	Nominated
2014	Annie Award	Outstanding Achievement, Writing in an Animated TV/Broadcast	Regular Show	Nominated
2015	Primetime Emmy	Outstanding Short-Form Animated Program	Regular Show, "White Elephant Gift Exchange"	Nominated
2020	Daytime Emmy	Outstanding Short Format Children's Programming	Mushroom and the Forest of the World	Nominated
2025	KidScreen Award	Best One-Off, Special, or TV Movie	Merry Little Batman	Won
2025	Children's and Family Emmy Awards	Outstanding Animated Special	Merry Little Batman	Nominated
