= Third-party accessories for the Wii Remote =

Since the release of the Wii, many aesthetic, ergonomic and functional accessories have been developed by third parties for the console’s controller, the Wii Remote.

== Custom usage of Wii Remote ==
The Wii Remote Bluetooth protocol can be implemented on other devices, including cell phones. Two students demonstrated this concept by creating a driver software that has the capability to connect the Wii Remote to a Symbian OS smartphone. The idea behind this driver is that a mobile phone with a TV-out port can replace the game console.

Programmer Johnny Lee produced video demos and sample code at his website related to the use of the Wii Remote for finger tracking, low-cost multi-point interactive whiteboards, and head tracking for desktop VR displays. This was the subject for his presentation at a TED conference, where he demonstrated several such applications. The WiimoteProject forum has become the discussion, support and sharing site for Lee's Wii Remote projects and other newer developments.

The Wii Remote is also used in fields outside of its standard use. The United States government has experimented with using it to control Packbot, a bomb disposal Robot. Studies have also been conducted to use the Wii Remote as a practice method to fine-tune surgeons' hand motions. Utilizing DarwiinRemote, researchers at the University of Memphis have adapted the Wii Remote for data collection in cognitive psychology experiments. Autodesk have released a plugin that allows the Wii Remote to control the orientation of 3D models in Autodesk Design Review.

== Controller alternatives ==
It was not until a few years after the Wii was released that third party companies such as Nyko and Mad Catz began making alternatives to the Wii Remote in many colors.

There have also been several third party Nunchuk Controllers, some of which have wireless functionality.

== Glove kits and grips ==
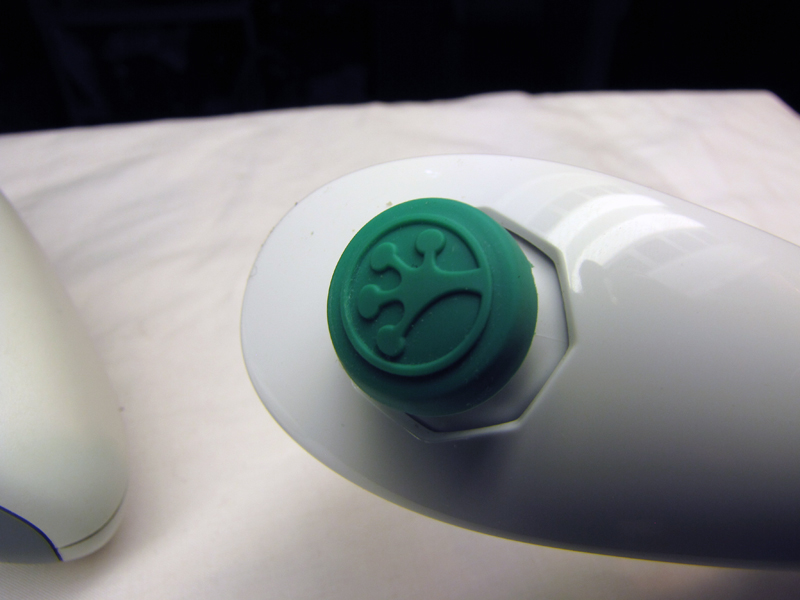
Nunchuk with the Grip-It accessory attached

Although Nintendo has released its own free Wii Remote Jacket that is shipped by request to existing Wii Remote owners, third-party glove kits to provide a better grip and cushioning (when compared to an un-jacketed remote) have been available for the Controller since its launch. These have been produced in several colors, some of which glow in the dark or change hue depending on the heat of the Player's hand. There are various themes as well, including themes based on the games The Legend Of Zelda: Twilight Princess and Pokémon Battle Revolution.

The Grip-It is a rubber overlay for the analog sticks of the Nunchuk and Classic Controller. These items increase the overall thumb grip on the analog sticks and give them added cushioning.

== Steering wheels ==
Prior to Nintendo's own Wii Wheel, several third-party steering wheel accessories had been introduced for the Wii Remote. One released by Ubisoft, the Wii Steering Wheel, was developed by Thrustmaster. It is bundled with certain games, such as Monster 4x4 World Circuit and GT Pro Series. The accessory, which is only for aesthetic/ergonomic enhancement, is meant for driving-style game-play in which the Wii Remote would be held lengthwise in a two-handed game-pad orientation, steering the subject by tilting the controller. The Wii Steering Wheel is also sold separately. Since the Wii Steering Wheel was revealed, other similarly designed Steering Wheel accessories have been produced.

== Sword and shield attachments ==
Sword and shield attachment sets have been released by various manufacturers, including ASiD Tech and Camy International. The accessories are simply shells, and do not provide any other functional purpose. The ASiD kit comes with a sword, a shield, and knife with a design resembling a scimitar, all molded from monotone plastic (white or black). The Hero Pack by Camy International consists of a sword and a shield, with colored designs very similar to the Master Sword and Hylian Shield from The Legend of Zelda series. The blade of the Hero Pack sword is made of soft foam for safety.

With both sets, the Wii Remote is cradled in the handle of the sword or knife so that the face buttons are accessible, with clearings for the B button and pointer lens. The Nunchuk is clipped into the handle of the shield. The configurations correspond to the sword and shield controls for The Legend of Zelda: Twilight Princess. Only three Wii games use Wii Remote and Nunchuk gestures to implement sword-and-shield combat, which are Twilight Princess, The Lord of the Rings: Aragorn's Quest and The Legend of Zelda: Skyward Sword.

In addition to fantasy-based sword attachments, there are also sci-fi laser sword attachments for the Wii Remote, which would befit Star Wars video games released for the Wii (such as Lego Star Wars: The Complete Saga, Star Wars: The Force Unleashed and Star Wars: The Clone Wars - Lightsaber Duels) that implement lightsaber combat with the Wii Remote. GameStop sells the Wii Dual Glow Sabers made by dreamGEAR. Thrustmaster, Intec, CTA Digital have also manufactured similar laser sword attachments that are widely available for purchase.

== Sports packages ==
The Wii Sports pack was released by GameStop in the United States and Logic3 in Europe. It includes a baseball bat, a golf club, and a tennis racket. It is very similar to the sword accessory and attaches to the Wii Remote to allow a more realistic experience with Wii Sports.

Soon after GameStop released their pack, Performance Designed Products (formally Pelican Accessories) released a Wii Nerf Sports Pack. It is identical to GameStop's pack however all the attachments are made out of Nerf foam material.

The boxing gloves are a separate accessory to the Wii Sports pack. With those, the player can put the Wii Remote and Nunchuk inside each glove underneath where one slips in hands. The Nunchuk is assigned to the left glove while the Wii Remote is right. In this way one can punch like an actual boxer instead of jabbing the controllers away from oneself.

The Wii Cue is a snooker cue extension for the Wii Remote. It is bundled with the game WSC REAL 08: World Snooker Championship. The Wii Cue is in effect a large stick that comes out in front of the Wii Remote. The player holds the remote in one hand and rests the cue between the thumb and forefinger to simulate a cue for snooker or pool.

The Wii Rod is a fishing rod attachment for the Wii Remote. The remote slips into a plastic jacket that has a rod on the end. It also features a reel that the Nunchuk fits into, allowing the player to reel in the fish with the Nunchuk. The Wii Rod is bundled with the game Rapala's Fishing Frenzy with Rod.

A miniature hockey stick peripheral was released with NHL Slapshot, allowing (but not requiring) the player to insert the Wii Remote and its Nunchuk attachment and simulate playing with a real hockey stick.

== Chargers ==
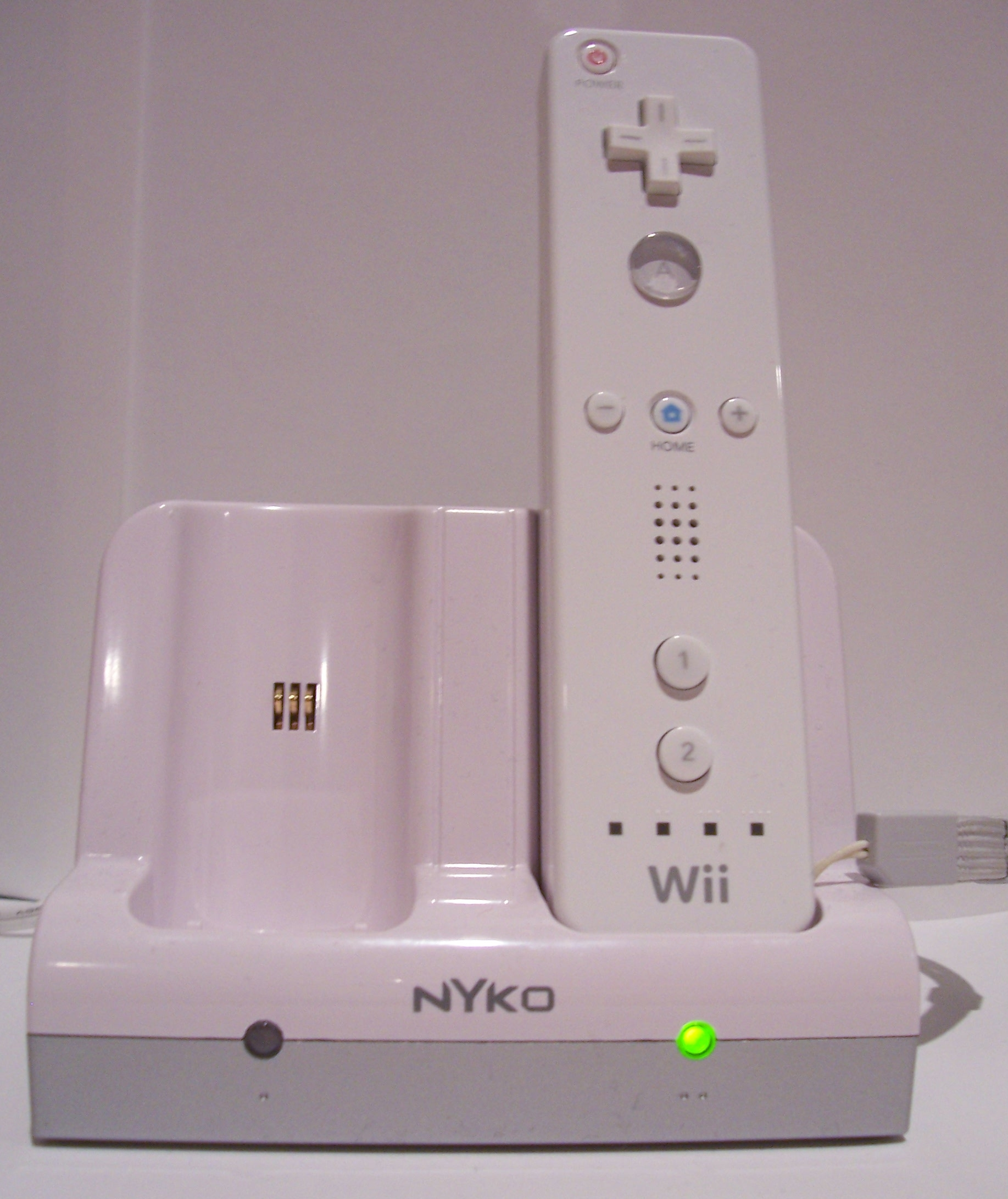
Nyko Charging Station (a.k.a. Nyko Charging Cradle)

While Nintendo does not offer any rechargeable options for the Wii Remote, recharging systems have been developed by various third-party peripheral companies. Nintendo has not released a rechargeable battery kit in regions outside Japan, but the Wii Remote and WaveBird controllers both use special battery contacts that are compatible with previously released Game Boy Advance accessories (AGB-003 and AGB-004, battery and charger respectively).

Several manufacturers offer direct-charging systems, many of which involve an integrated battery pack/compartment cover with electrical contacts that connect to a charging cradle. Other available features include silicone-covered battery packs for added grip, Nunchuk cradles, and compatibility with WaveBird and Game Boy Advance.

After Nintendo introduced the protective Wii Remote Jacket as standard-issue for Wii Remotes, peripheral companies later released contactless direct-charging systems which utilize inductive charging, allowing a Wii Remote to be charged with a Wii Remote Jacket on. On August 25, 2008, Sanyo released its first Contactless Charger Set for Wii Remote in Japan, which features Sanyo's low self-discharge NiMH battery technology, and is marketed under the eneloop brand. The Contactless Charger Set for Wii Remote is made under official license from Nintendo. On May 11, 2009, Performance Designed Products released the Energizer Induction Charge System in the United States, which is compatible with Wii MotionPlus.

To better facilitate charging for both Wii Remotes and Wii Remotes with Wii MotionPlus, some newer inductive charging systems feature alternative designs which use magnets to align the controllers. Devices include the Energizer Flat Panel Induction Charger and the Nyko Charge Base IC, both released in late 2009.

The Psyclone- and React-branded Wii 4-Dock Recharge Station was recalled in August 2009, due to fire risk.

The Joytech "Wii Power Station" charging kit was also recalled in March 2010 due to fire concerns.

Mad Catz also released a Sonic the Hedgehog collectable Wiimote charger in late 2010.

== Arcade joysticks ==
With the announcement of Neo Geo games being available on the Wii Virtual Console service, third-party game peripheral manufacturer Hori revealed the "Fighting Stick Wii" controller. An expansion of the Wii Remote, the Fighting Stick Wii is an arcade style controller with compatibility with the non-analog functionality of the Classic Controller (the L and R buttons have no analog functionality, and analog sticks are not included). In addition, the action buttons have turbo button functionality (approximately 20 presses per second). The controller was released in Japan on August 30, 2007, for JP¥5,280. The Fighting Stick Wii was released on November 6, 2007 in the United States.

SNK Playmore have also released a Wii-compatible version of the Neo Geo Stick 2, which resembles the first party controller of the Neo Geo console. Like the Hori Fighting Stick Wii, it has similar non-analog Classic Controller functionality. It was released in Japan on April 10, 2008.

Overline Gaming has released an arcade joystick attachment, named The Shaft.

In conjunction with the US Release of Tatsunoko vs. Capcom: Ultimate All-Stars. Mad Catz released a joystick known as the Tatsunoko vs. Capcom Arcade Fightstick, which not only works with Tatsunoko vs. Capcom, but with most Virtual Console and Wii games which use the classic controllers (one exception though is Heavy Barrel on Data East Arcade Classics due to the use of the Classic Controller right thumbstick for aiming purposes).

== Gun peripherals ==
Despite an official Wii Zapper expansion released by Nintendo, some gun peripherals have been shown by third parties. The first of these appeared in early April, when GameStop listed a "Wii Blaster" peripheral on its website, with a release date of May 1, 2007. Originally listed without a specified manufacturer, the Wii Blaster had been speculated to be the Zapper, but has since been indicated to be produced by third party accessories manufacturer Core Gamer. On May 5, 2007, GameStop announced that the Wii Blaster release date was changed to June 26, 2007, when it was available for purchase.

== Musical instrument controllers ==
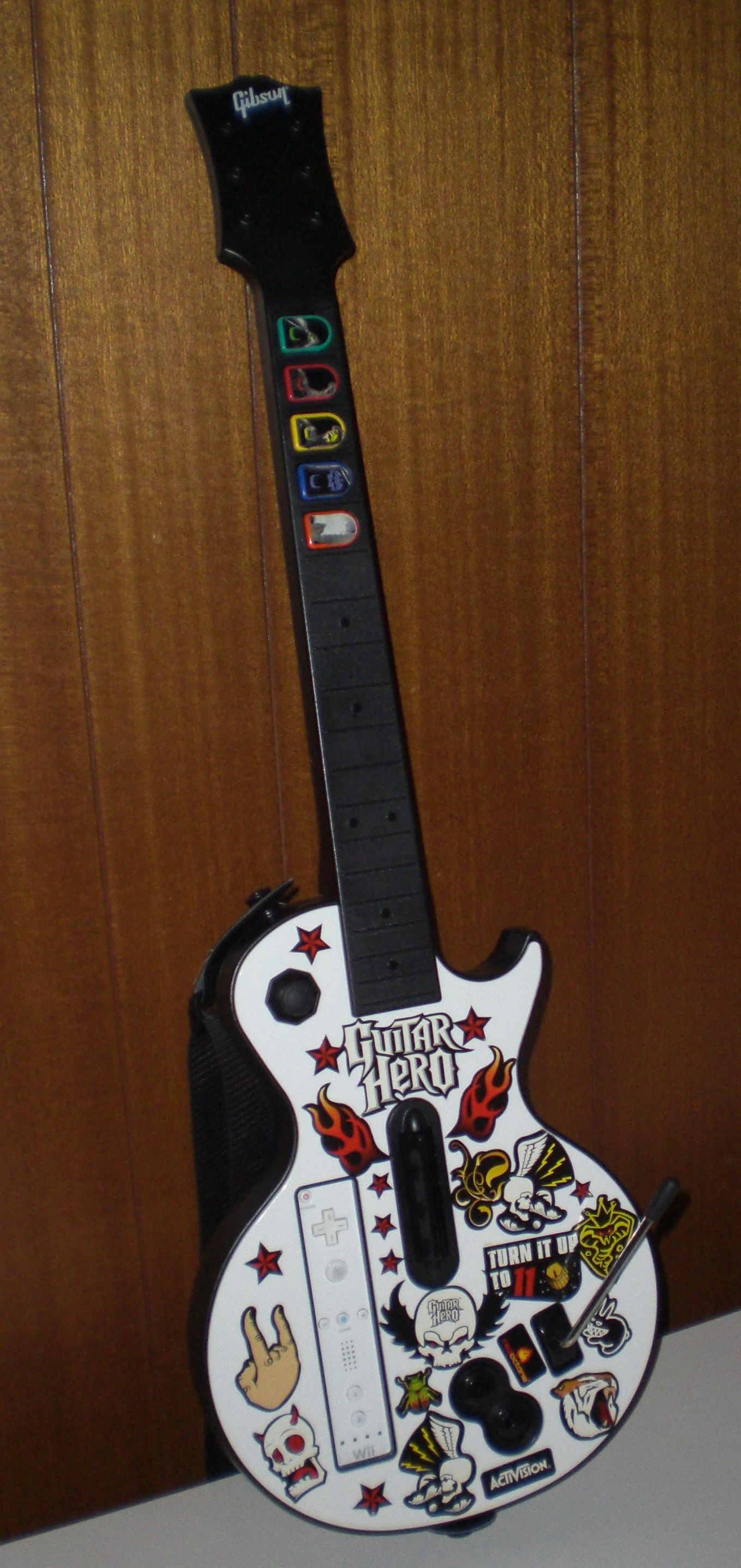
A Guitar Hero controller for the Wii

The Wii version of Guitar Hero III: Legends of Rock is bundled with a white Gibson Les Paul-style guitar controller. It includes a slot for the Wii Remote to fit into, though the Wii Remote Jacket must be removed first, and utilizes the wireless capabilities, accelerometer, rumble feature and speaker of the Wii Remote. It also features an analog stick that can be used to navigate the Wii Menu. Like the PS3 and Xbox 360 guitar controllers, the Wii Les Paul can be customized with detachable faceplates. The Les Paul also comes with the special edition of Guitar Hero: Aerosmith which includes an Aerosmith-themed faceplate. The Gibson Les Paul controller is also available for purchase separately from the game.

At the 2008 Consumer Electronics Show, Nyko revealed a similar guitar controller for the Wii, a replica of a butterscotch blonde Fender Telecaster. This marks the first third-party guitar controller for the console. Other third-party guitar controllers have also since become available. In lieu of using guitar controllers, the Wii version of PopStar Guitar uses a Wii Remote controller shell called the AirG that allows players to play air guitar-style in conjunction with the Nunchuk.

In addition to a revised guitar controller, Guitar Hero World Tour, the sequel to Guitar Hero III, features a wireless drum kit controller which also has a slot for the Wii Remote.

The Wii version of Taiko no Tatsujin features its own drum controller called the TaTaCon (styled as a miniature taiko drum) that plugs into the Wii Remote.

The Wii version of Samba de Amigo features additional maraca-shaped attachments for the Wii Remote and Nunchuk.

In 2009, the DJ Turntable, also containing a slot for the Wii Remote was released to accompany DJ Hero.

== uDraw GameTablet ==
The uDraw GameTablet is a gaming graphics tablet released by THQ for the Wii. It has a pressure-sensitive stylus which allows users to draw and view their creations on screen. The tablet is motion-sensitive through the Wii Remote, which lets users tilt and roll the tablet for various changes in gameplay.

The white version of the device was introduced exclusively for the Wii on November 14, 2010. Subsequently, a black-colored version for the Wii was released on November 15, 2011. The Wii uDraw GameTablet is bundled with an art-based video game, uDraw Studio. Additional titles include uDraw Pictionary, Disney Princess: Enchanting Storybooks, Marvel Super Hero Squad: Comic Combat, The Penguins of Madagascar: Dr. Blowhole Returns – Again!, SpongeBob SquigglePants and Dood's Big Adventure.

Although the release of the device for the Wii met with some success, the product was discontinued by THQ in February 2012.

== Wii jOG ==
jOG for the Wii, or as it is more commonly known, Wii jOG is a device developed by New Concept Gaming for Nintendo's Wii console. It was released on October 31, 2008 in the United Kingdom and is based on a similar device made by the same company for the PlayStation 2. New Concept Gaming went into liquidation in 2010, and all official websites went offline.

The device serves as a pedometer that attaches to the Nunchuk extension of the Wii Remote. The device detects body motion, and users can move characters on the screen by making steps or by jogging in place. The device is compatible with Wii games which use the Nunchuk joystick, with some games being more compatible than others. Studies conducted by John Moores University have shown that the device makes users exercise, saying that users will take between 6,000 and 10,000 steps per hour of gameplay while using the device, burning approximately 225 kcal per hour. Users have also experienced a 40% higher heart rate using the Wii jOG than playing a video game while seated.
