= UDraw GameTablet =

Video game accessory

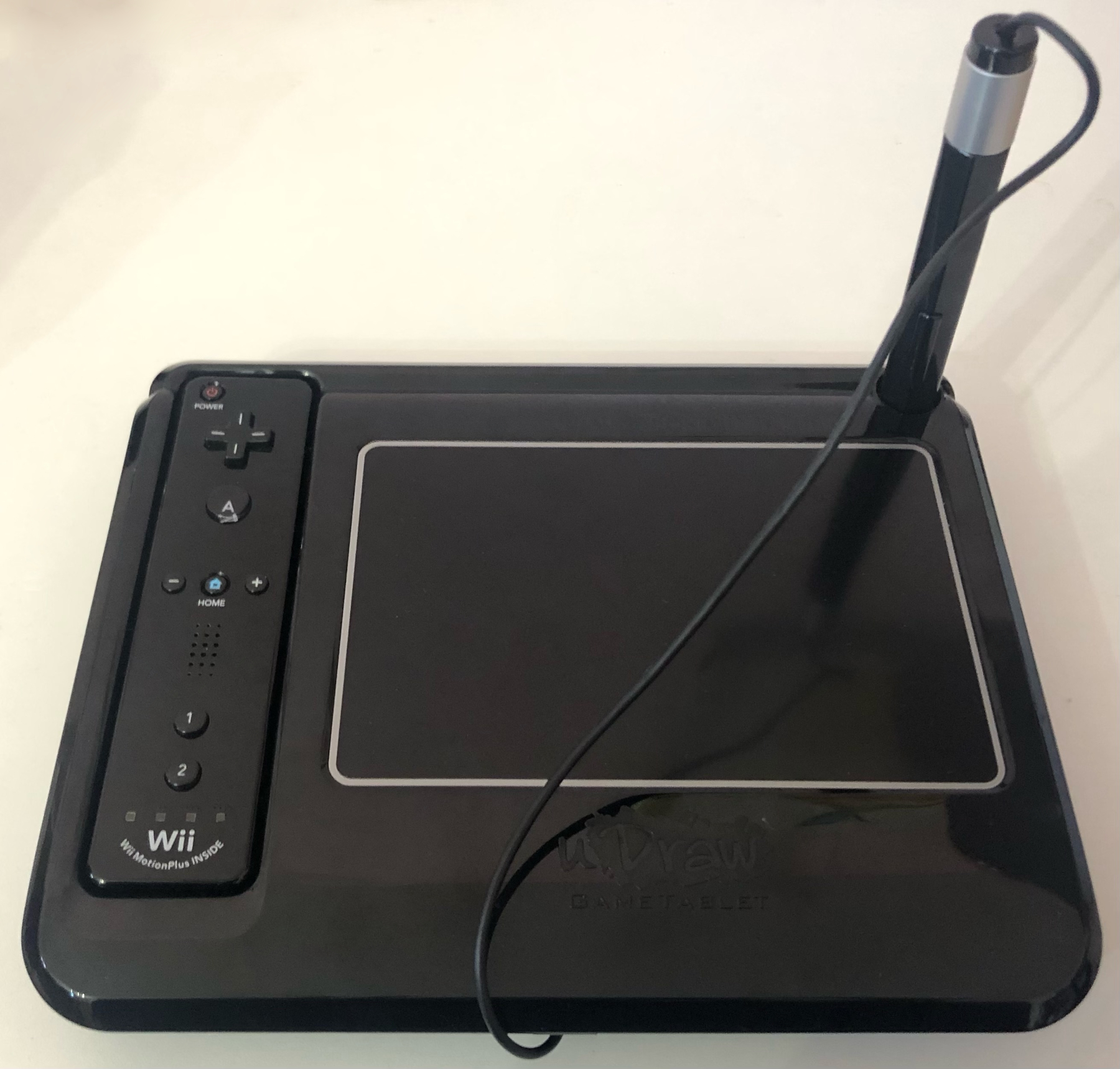
The uDraw GameTablet for the Wii

The uDraw GameTablet is a gaming graphics tablet released by THQ for the Wii in 2010, and for the PlayStation 3 and Xbox 360 in 2011. It has a pressure-sensitive stylus which allows users to draw and view their creations on screen. The tablet is motion-sensitive through either the Wii Remote or internal accelerometers, which lets users tilt and roll the tablet for various changes in gameplay.

The initial white version of the device was introduced exclusively for the Wii on November 14, 2010. Subsequently, black-colored versions for the PlayStation 3, Xbox 360 and Wii were released a year later on November 15, 2011. The Wii uDraw GameTablet is bundled with an art-based video game, uDraw Studio, while the uDraw GameTablet for the PlayStation 3 and Xbox 360 comes with uDraw Studio: Instant Artist. Additional titles include uDraw Pictionary, Disney Princess: Enchanting Storybooks, Marvel Super Hero Squad: Comic Combat, The Penguins of Madagascar: Dr. Blowhole Returns – Again!, SpongeBob SquigglePants and Dood's Big Adventure.

The initial release of the device for the Wii met with some success, but THQ's expanded release of the uDraw for the PlayStation 3 and Xbox 360 has been described as a "disaster". THQ's Chief Financial Officer described 1.4 million unsold units as the primary reason for a revenue shortfall of around $100 million.

THQ discontinued production of the tablet in early February 2012. "THQ has no future commitments or plans to manufacture uDraw hardware," the company told investors. "THQ's strategy is to focus on its premium core and fighting franchises and to expand its digital revenues." Following the eventual collapse of THQ in December 2012, former company president Jason Rubin described the uDraw as one of the "massive mistakes" which had led to the company's demise.

== Development ==
The uDraw GameTablet was developed by THQ as a gaming accessory for the Wii. It was the first drawing device for the seventh generation home consoles. After the release of Drawn to Life: The Next Chapter for the Nintendo Wii, THQ began development on the uDraw, then called the "Drawn To Life Pal" in reference to the Drawn to Life series. Original plans were to use the tablet for a licensed Drawn to Life spin-off game in the same vein as Drawn to Life: SpongeBob SquarePants Edition, though no other licensed Drawn to Life games were ever released and the uDraw was never made compatible with any game in the series.

The original uDraw GameTablet has a 4 by 6-inch drawing surface on which users can create free-form drawings and artwork, as well as play games designed specifically for the uDraw GameTablet, using an attached pressure-sensitive stylus pen. The stylus also has a dualfunction seesaw button that emulates the C and Z buttons on the Wii Nunchuk. The Wii Remote docks in the Wii's uDraw GameTablet, which draws power directly from the Wii Remote’s battery. The uDraw GameTablet also takes advantage of the Wii Remote’s motion sensors and tilt movement options, allowing users to control their characters by moving and directing them throughout levels of the game.

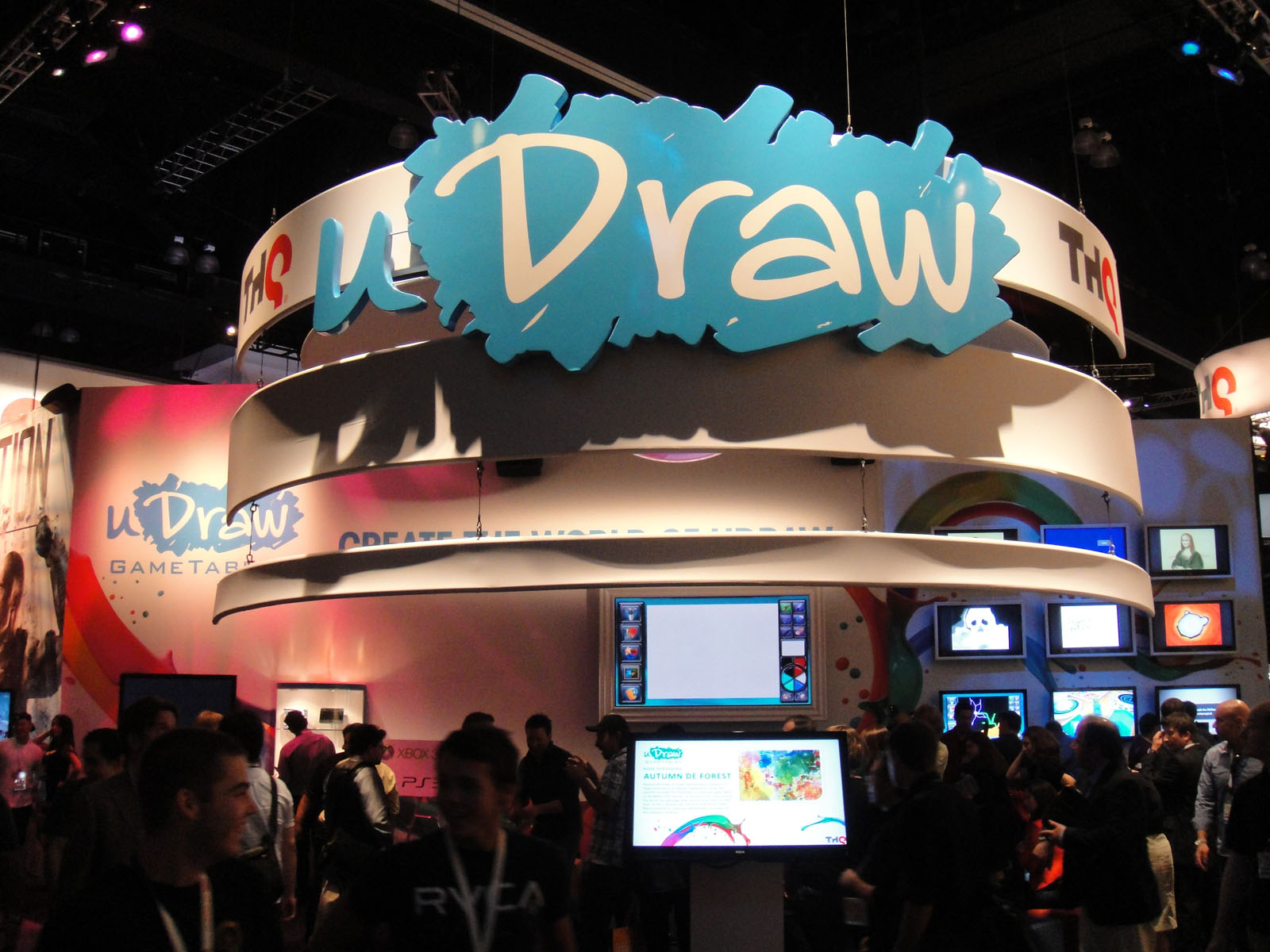
uDraw promotion at E3 2011

The PlayStation 3 and Xbox 360 versions have a different design in comparison to the original Wii version, including horizontal stylus holders instead of the original's vertical holder, and buttons and directional pads similar to the ones found on the DualShock 3 and Xbox 360 controllers. Likewise, the PlayStation and Xbox versions use internal accelerometers, although PlayStation-makers Sony have previously released its own motion-sensitive controller, the PlayStation Move, which is not used alongside the uDraw GameTablet. Additionally, the uDraw GameTablet for these consoles feature high definition input, with pinch-and-stretch and rotation features.

The PlayStation 3 and Xbox 360 versions were only produced for 4 months. THQ abandoned uDraw completely during February 2012 to focus on its core adult gaming audience and to regain a profit.

=== uDraw Studio Instant Artist ===
The uDraw GameTablet is bundled with uDraw Studio Instant Artist. Previously, the uDraw GameTablet came with uDraw Studio (developed by Pipeworks Software). Both allow users to draw, color, paint and create works of art. Players can use the available tools and features to draw, paint and color simple shapes, or experiment with different painting styles, layers and shading under three different modes of play: Art School, Art Play, and Art Camp. Art School offers interactive tutorials with Remmy, the game's 3D animated host, while Art Play allows for freestyle painting and drawing, and Art Camp offers a variety of art activities. uDraw Studio Instant Artist has art education materials to help players learn how to draw and paint.

The game comes with a library of more than 300 stamps with rotation and animation features, and various post-processing effects, including black-and-white, sepia and neon. Because of the versatility of the game, players can create any kind of art they want and get precise painting options through zooming, pinching or stretching their artwork on the tablet. Sliders and toggles adjust brush size, paint drop-off and opacity.

Features on uDraw Studio Instant Artist include:

- Painting – Paint or draw using 19 media options, including paint splat and tilt-control painting.
- Three modes of play – Art School, Art Play and Art Camp.
- Art tutorials guided by 3D animated host Remmy.
- Toolbox – Change color palettes, brushes, canvases and pens on-screen.
- Replay – Watch the creation of art stroke-by-stroke at normal, 8x and 9x speeds.
- Gallery – Go through previous art works or replay and augment the art already created.
- Save and Share – Upload artwork online to save, share and print directly from the console.
- Touch-sensitive controls – Pinch and stretch gestures with the Xbox 360 and PlayStation 3.

== Games ==
The following Wii games require the uDraw Game Tablet:

Title	Developer	Publisher	Bundled	Release date N. America	Release date Europe	Release date Australia
uDraw Studio	Pipeworks Software	THQ	Yes	November 14, 2010	March 4, 2011	February 24, 2011
Pictionary	Page 44 Studios	THQ	Some	November 14, 2010	March 4, 2011	February 24, 2011
Dood's Big Adventure	THQ Digital Studios Phoenix	THQ	Some	November 14, 2010	March 4, 2011	February 24, 2011
SpongeBob SquigglePants	WayForward Technologies	THQ	Some	April 12, 2011	April 15, 2011	April 14, 2011
Kung Fu Panda 2	Griptonite Games	THQ	N/A	May 24, 2011	June 10, 2011	June 16, 2011
The Penguins of Madagascar: Dr. Blowhole Returns - Again!	Griptonite Games	THQ	N/A	September 6, 2011	September 16, 2011	N/A
Disney Princess: Enchanting Storybooks	Disney Interactive Studios, Page 44 Studios	THQ	Some	November 1, 2011	November 18, 2011	November 17, 2011
Marvel Super Hero Squad: Comic Combat	Griptonite Games	THQ	N/A	November 15, 2011	November 18, 2011	November 17, 2011
uDraw Studio: Instant Artist	Pipeworks Software	THQ	Yes	November 15, 2011	November 18, 2011	November 17, 2011
Disney Animator	Disney Interactive Studios	THQ	No	Cancelled (planned for release in March 2012)	N/A	N/A

== Reception ==
The uDraw GameTablet hardware and video games have generally received positive reviews. In August 2010 at the announcement of uDraw, analysts predicted that uDraw could "sell up to one million units", with the potential to be a sleeper hit during the 2010 holiday season. THQ also showcased uDraw at GamesCom 2010 and reviewers noted that the clean user interface and simple design "makes it accessible to the widest audience possible".

Joystiq said that the GameTablet's "simple mostly-white design makes it a perfect companion for the Wii", noting that the replay function is a cool feature: "In the hands of a capable artist, this will undoubtedly make for some mesmerizing videos." USA Today said that "navigating with the stylus feels easy", and both the tablet and stylus handled coloring and stroke move well. Digital Spy reviewed the new uDraw GameTablet for the Xbox 360 and PlayStation 3: "the range of functionality makes it a good option for families and the casual market." In contrast, Calum Wilson Austin of The Sydney Morning Herald gave the Tablet a 3/10, saying, "While this peripheral might entertain children, anyone else will be better served with a pen and a blank piece of paper."

== See also ==
- List of commercial failures in video games
