= Page 44 Studios =

American video game developer

- Company type: Subsidiary of Zynga
- Founded: 1998
- Defunct: 2011; 15 years ago
- Fate: Closed
- Headquarters: San Francisco, California, U.S.
- Key people: Steven Apour; (General Manager); Denis Fung; (Director of Development); Tom Shoenhair; (SVP)
- Products: Tony Hawk's Project 8 Tony Hawk's Proving Ground
- Number of employees: 60
- Parent: Zynga (2011)

Page 44 Studios was an American video game developer based in San Francisco, California. It was founded in 1998 by General Manager Steven Apour and Director of Development Denis Fung. It was also named after its original office location at 44 Page Street in San Francisco. Page 44 Studios worked with several video game publishers such as 2D Boy, Disney Interactive Studios, THQ, Electronic Arts, Sony Computer Entertainment, and Activision. In September 2011, the company was acquired by the mobile division of Zynga. At Zynga, Page 44 Studios created the Party Place game for Android/iOS, and a few other prototypes.

== Games ==
Released Titles:

Year	Title	Platform(s)										
Year	Title	PS1	PS2	WIN	PSP	Xbox	Wii	iOS	PS3	X360	DS	DROI
2001	NHL 2001	Yes	Yes	Yes	No	No	No	No	No	No	No	No
2001	Supercross 2001	Yes	No	No	No	No	No	No	No	No	No	No
2001	Freekstyle	No	Yes	No	No	No	No	No	No	No	No	No
2004	Gretzky NHL 2005	No	Yes	No	Yes	No	No	No	No	No	No	No
2005	Gretzky NHL 2006	No	Yes	No	Yes	No	No	No	No	No	No	No
2006	The Godfather: The Game	No	Yes	No	Yes	Yes	No	No	No	No	No	No
2006	Tony Hawk's Project 8	No	No	No	Yes	No	No	No	No	No	No	No
2007	Tony Hawk's Proving Ground	No	Yes	No	No	No	Yes	No	No	No	No	No
2008	World of Goo	No	No	No	No	No	No	Yes	No	No	No	No
2008	High School Musical 3: Senior Year DANCE!	No	Yes	Yes	No	No	Yes	No	No	Yes	No	No
2009	Hannah Montana: Rock Out the Show	No	No	No	Yes	No	No	No	No	No	No	No
2009	Madden NFL 10	No	No	No	No	No	No	Yes	No	No	No	No
2010	Disney Channel All Star Party	No	No	No	No	No	Yes	No	No	No	No	No
2010	uDraw Pictionary	No	No	No	No	No	Yes	No	Yes	Yes	No	No
2010	Madden NFL 11	No	No	No	No	No	No	Yes	No	No	No	No
2011	Madden NFL 12	No	No	No	No	No	No	Yes	No	No	No	No
2011	Disney Princess: Enchanting Storybooks	No	No	No	No	No	Yes	No	No	No	Yes	No
2011	Party Place	No	No	No	No	No	No	Yes	No	No	No	Yes
