= Disney Channel All Star Party =

2010 video game

- North American box art
- Developer: Page 44 Studios
- Publisher: Disney Interactive Studios
- Composer: Andy Blythe; Marten Joustra
- Platform: Wii
- Release: NA: October 26, 2010; EU: November 5, 2010
- Genre: Party
- Modes: Single player, Multiplayer

Disney Channel All Star Party is a party video game based on several Disney Channel franchises, exclusively for Wii. This game uses characters, games, and stages from Phineas and Ferb, Jonas L.A., Sonny with a Chance, Wizards of Waverly Place, Hannah Montana Forever, The Suite Life on Deck, and Camp Rock 2: The Final Jam. It was released in North America on October 26, 2010, and in Europe on November 5. It is published by Disney Interactive Studios and developed by Page 44 Studios. It is the second Disney game to feature Miis as player characters.

== Gameplay ==
Disney Channel All Star Party is a party video game in which stages resemble board games, with 30 minigames based on several Disney Channel television series and the Camp Rock films.
