= Kung Fu Panda 2 (video game) =

2011 video game

- North American cover art for the Xbox 360 version
- Developer: Griptonite Games
- Publisher: THQ
- Producer: Dan Carver
- Designer: Geoffrey Card
- Programmer: David Lawson
- Artist: Jerusha Hardman
- Composer: Laura Karpman
- Platforms: PlayStation 3, Xbox 360, Wii, Nintendo DS
- Release: NA: May 24, 2011; AU: May 28, 2011; EU: June 7, 2011; RU: July 5, 2011
- Genres: Action-adventure, platform Role-playing (Nintendo DS version)
- Modes: Single-player, multiplayer

Kung Fu Panda 2 is a 2011 video game developed by Griptonite Games and published by THQ. It is based on the 2011 film of the same name, taking place after the events of the film. The game was released for PlayStation 3, Xbox 360, Wii, and Nintendo DS on May 24, 2011. The Xbox 360 version requires Kinect. The Wii version uses the uDraw GameTablet.

== Plot ==
=== Kinect version ===
Before the game starts, Po (who is now the Dragon Warrior and a Kung Fu master) has a short Kung Fu tutorial with the player, teaching the player some basic moves, like punching and kicking. Then the story of the game starts.

The story of the game happens after the events of the film of the same name. Master Po, the rest of the Furious Five, and the villagers celebrate after defeating Lord Shen, the peacock. However, remnants of Shen's Wolf and gorillas arrive, create chaos, and capture various villagers. Unknown to Po, the Five, and the Villagers, two Komodo dragon mercenaries planned to use Shen's thugs to distract Po and the Five, and with them out of the way, they plan to take over Gongmen City. Shifu holds a meeting with Master Storming Ox and Master Croc.

Master Storming Ox says that they can't let the thugs take over the city, so Shifu, Storming Ox and Croc decide to split up and go around the city to stop the thugs. Po, with nothing to do, decides to tag along with Master Storming Ox, too. Po and Storming Ox have to attack and defeat all the Komodo dragons' minions and Shen's thugs at the same time. They track down the thugs to the Undercity, an underground city, and find Komodo dragons lurking there, and realize that the Komodo dragons were behind this, and get to the place where the Komodo dragons are lurking and fight some of them and continue to fight more and more Komodo dragons, before they fight the final boss.

Throughout the game, there are other short Kung Fu tutorials with Po. However, these tutorials are different from the first, because in the tutorials, there is usually a minion of Shen or the Komodo dragons for Po to fight to show an example for the player.

=== PlayStation 3 / Wii version ===
The plot of the PlayStation 3 / Wii version is the same as the Kinect version. During the game, all tutorials are excluded. The game skips straight to the start of the story, as the villagers of the Valley of Peace celebrate the defeat of Lord Shen. However, Lord Shen's goons appear and attack the villagers. Unknown to Po and the Five, two Komodo dragons plan to use the goons to distract Po and the Furious Five and take over Gongmen City.

Po runs to tell Master Shifu, Master Storming Ox and Master Croc, who are having a meeting. Po accidentally interrupts them, and tells them about the news. Shifu and the two Masters already know about the news, and have been discussing about it. Master Storming Ox implies that the goons will ruin the spirits of the villagers, and the three Master agree to split up and drive away the thugs, with Shifu going uptown, Ox going North, and Croc going to the Docks to the South. Po, with nothing to do, decides to go with one of the Masters. Unlike the Kinect version, the player can choose which Master to go with.

== Gameplay ==
The gameplay styles of Kung Fu Panda 2 differ across game platforms. In the Kinect version, a player's body movements are used to control Po, and the player is able to perform basic kung fu moves, like punches, kicks and blocks. If the player jumps, Po will jump and also double-kick. The player can use these moves to wear out enemies. To finish the enemy, the player can use several kinds of kung fu techniques, such as the flowing form. Because the player can only use body movements to control Po, the player is not able to move around without also moving Po.

In the PlayStation 3 version of the game, the player can move Po around, and can use moves similar to the game based on the original film to defeat enemies.

== Reception ==
Unlike the first game, Kung Fu Panda 2 received generally mixed to negative reviews from critics. Metacritic calculated a score of 50 out of 100 for the Xbox 360 version based on 18 reviews. The DS version was received a little better, scoring a rating of 59. The game fared worse with a rating of 31/100 for the PS3 version from 7 critics. On GameSpot, the game received a poorer rating, receiving only 3.5 out of 10 points. The game received a slightly more positive score on IGN, receiving 6.5 out of 10 points. However, IGN gave the PlayStation 3 version of the game a low score, giving it only 3.5 points. Play also gave the game a 20%.
