= UDraw Pictionary =

2010 video game

uDraw Pictionary
- North American cover art
- Developer: Page 44 Studios
- Publisher: THQ
- Series: uDraw
- Platform: Wii
- Release: NA: November 14, 2010; AU: February 24, 2011; EU: March 4, 2011
- Genre: Art

uDraw Pictionary is an art-based video game developed by Page 44 Studios and published by THQ Inc. that players can play on the uDraw GameTablet for the Nintendo Wii. The game is based on the popular board game Pictionary, in which players draw pictures based on clues from a subject and have their teammates guess what specific words the picture is supposed to represent. It was released on November 14, 2010, for the Nintendo Wii game system.

Designed as a multi-player game or party game for all ages, players can choose teams of up to four people to play. Since the uDraw GameTablet comes bundled with uDraw Studio, another art-based video game, players can learn how the tablet and stylus pen work before playing, and as how to draw, color, and sketch on the tablet. uDraw Pictionary includes more than 3,000 clues, with traditional Adult Clues like Object, Difficult, and Action or Junior Clues like "Animal Houses" and "At the Zoo" for younger players. The game differs somewhat from classic Pictionary, as the video game has new draw modes. The normal Pictionary mode lets users play the game show-style on a 3D game board with a variety of drawing tools, brushes and colors to choose from for a livelier sketching experience. Pictionary Mania has a custom game board and seven new draw modes, including Get It Straight, Shape It Up, Rotation Frustration, One Line, Ink Limit, No Peeking and Off Hand. Free Draw lets players use the drawing tools in the uDraw GameTablet to create works of art.

uDraw Pictionary has generally received very positive reviews. When THQ previewed it at Gamescom2010, reviewers noted that its additional mode "does crazy things like limit the amount of ink you have available to draw with, rotates the image while you are drawing or makes you draw without lifting the stylus from the tablet, to name but a few. This adds a freshness to the Pictionary experience that is bound to go down well with family and friends."

== Gameplay ==
Designed as a multi-player game or party game for all ages, players can choose teams of up to four people to play. Since the uDraw GameTablet comes bundled with uDraw Studio, another art-based video game, players can familiarize themselves with how the tablet and stylus pen work before playing, as well as how to draw, color and sketch on the tablet.

To play, users roll dice by flicking the stylus pen on the tablet and advance through the spaces on the game board. Players draw clues and have their teammates guess what the picture is within the 60-second time frame. The object of the game is to be the first team to reach the last space on the board.

uDraw Pictionary includes more than 3,000 clues, with traditional Adult Clues like Object, Difficult and Action or Junior Clues like “Animal Houses” and “At the Zoo” for younger players. The game differs somewhat from classic Pictionary, as the video game has new draw modes. The normal Pictionary mode lets users play the game show-style on a 3D game board with a variety of drawing tools, brushes and colors to choose from for a livelier sketching experience. Pictionary Mania has a custom game board and seven new draw modes, including Get It Straight, Shape It Up, Rotation Frustration, One Line, Ink Limit, No Peeking and Off Hand. Free Draw lets players use the drawing tools in the uDraw GameTablet to create works of art.

== Reception ==
uDraw Pictionary has generally received very positive reviews. When THQ previewed Pictionary at Gamescom2010, reviewers noted that the game's additional mode “does crazy things like limit the amount of ink you have available to draw with, rotates the image while you are drawing or makes you draw without lifting the stylus from the tablet, to name but a few. This adds a freshness to the Pictionary experience that is bound to go down well with family and friends.” Video game reviewers at Joystiq noted that “the uDraw version does include one variation that makes the game much more difficult, and arguably more fun.” IGN said Pictionary was “designed with a family atmosphere in mind,” making it the “party game” among games designed for the uDraw GameTablet. USA Today wrote that Pictionary could be “the best title -- and potentially the most popular -- for uDraw.”
