= Party Place =

2012 video game

- Developer: Zynga
- Platforms: iOS, Android
- Release: December 6, 2012
- Genre: social network game
- Mode: Single-player with multiplayer interaction

Party Place is a defunct virtual party simulation and social game developed by Zynga. It is the company's first 3D mobile game. Party Place launched globally December 6, 2012 for iOS and Android devices.

== Gameplay ==
In this game, players create an avatar based on a social stereotype, such as sassy, glamorous, or risque, to represent them. Avatars can be customized to change their attributes such as hair, clothing, and eye color. From there, players decorate their home, throw parties, clean up afterwards, and then get ready for the next bash. Using items in the player's home allows energy to be spent or earned. Players earn "party mojo" by creating emotional episodes through their interactions with other partygoers. Examples of emotional episodes include making out with other party goers or starting fights. Players can invite friends to join them at a party and can also crash their friends' parties. Games.com's Joe Osborne said that the game appeared to be "a cross between The Sims FreePlay by EA and Zynga's own YoVille."

The game was free to play and included locked content. obtained by regularly playing the game. Players spent real money to purchase in-game coin bundles to access locked content.

== Development ==
The game was initially given a limited release in December 2012 to the Canadian App Store. On December 6, 2012, the game was made available to United States customers and others worldwide. GameZebo's John Anthony said he was surprised that Party Place "doesn't appear to mirror the design of an existing game, a practice that has gotten the company into trouble on more than one occasion."
