= SpongeBob SquigglePants =

2011 video game

- Wii cover art
- Developer: WayForward Technologies
- Publisher: THQ
- Director: James Montagna
- Producers: Jeff Pomegranate; Robb Alvey
- Designers: James Montagna; Adam Tierney
- Programmers: George Mathews; Daniel Yoon
- Artists: Rob Buchanan; Paul Castillo
- Writer: Luke Brookshier
- Composer: Jake Kaufman
- Series: SpongeBob SquarePants
- Engine: EngineBlack
- Platforms: Wii (uDraw); Nintendo 3DS
- Release: Wii: NA: April 12, 2011; AU: April 14, 2011; EU: April 15, 2011; Nintendo 3DS: NA: May 17, 2011; AU: May 26, 2011; EU: May 27, 2011
- Genre: Action
- Mode: Single-player

SpongeBob SquigglePants (also known as SpongeBob SquigglePants 3D for the Nintendo 3DS port) is a 2011 action video game based on the SpongeBob SquarePants television series, developed by WayForward Technologies and published by THQ. The game was first announced on March 23, 2011, and was released for Wii in North America on April 12, 2011, in Australia on April 14, 2011, and in Europe on April 15, 2011. The Nintendo 3DS version was released in North America on May 17, 2011, in Australia on May 26, 2011, and in Europe on May 27, 2011. It is the fourth game to use the uDraw GameTablet accessory and borrows its concept from the WarioWare series, consisting of a series of minigames. SpongeBob SquigglePants also features appearances from Patchy the Pirate (played by Tom Kenny), the president of the SpongeBob fan club, as its live-action host.

== Overview ==
One of the examples of the Nanogames is "That Takes the Spongecake", where the player tilts the tablet to help SpongeBob blow out all the birthday cake candles.

SpongeBob SquigglePants consists of over 100 mini-games (or Nanogames) which require using the uDraw GameTablet. Each game has a time limit of a few seconds and can only be tried five times before failing. Examples include "Flying Disc of the Deep", where the player flicks the stylus to toss a flying disc to Larry the Lobster; "That Takes the Spongecake", where the player tilts the tablet to help SpongeBob blow out all the birthday cake candles; and "A Bridge Abridged", where the player draws a quick line between two cliffs to create a bridge for Plankton to cross and grab his coveted Krabby Patty, which its mini-games borrows its concept from the WarioWare series.

SpongeBob SquigglePants also features appearances from Patchy the Pirate, the president of the SpongeBob fan club, as its live-action host. Patchy guides players through the game and makes surprise appearances and interacts with players as they play the Nanogames. SpongeBob SquigglePants also lets players digitally draw, paint and color with a free-form drawing function, or choose from several SpongeBob-themed stamps. With the uDraw's exclusive ability to export art to the Wii system's SD card slot, players can also put their drawings worthy of a place in Patchy's own collection of SpongeBob art – or their own refrigerator. The SD card capability also makes it possible to share artwork with friends via e-mail or save it to computer desktops.

== Development ==
The Wii version was first announced on THQ's official press release on April 12, 2011. Manuel wanted players to capture "the fun and excitement of SpongeBob and his friends and gives fans a new way to experience the world of Bikini Bottom".

The game was also designed to treat fans to styles from the Nickelodeon vault, including "B-Movie", inspired by the days of drive-in movies and stylish horror films; "Sketch Bob", which gives the inhabitants of Bikini Bottom a freehand style look; "Simply Bob", a stylized and abstract interpretation of life under the sea; and many others. The 3DS version was originally announced in late March 2011.

== Reception ==
SpongeBob SquigglePants received "mixed or average reviews" according to Metacritic.

Christopher Healy reviewed it for Common Sense Media, giving the game four out of five stars. Healy warned parents about the cartoon violence in few of the mini-games but praised the game for its ease of play and messages about art. In a review for USA Today on April 25, 2011, Jinny Gudmundsen awarded the game three out of four stars and said that the game was worthwhile because of its novel gameplay. In Atomic Gamer's review on May 10, 2011, it was awarded an overall score of six out of ten and said "SpongeBob SquigglePants" is a great game to showcase this device, especially with the huge number of ways it uses the tablet and even pokes fun at other, more "mature" video games now and then. It won't be terribly engaging for an adult, but this is a fantastic gift for a little SpongeBob fan."

Dave Rudden of GamePro gave the 3DS version 3 stars, stating "THQ and Wayforward Technologies both deserve some credit for making a game that feels as close to a first-party effort as anything seen on the 3DS yet, as SpongeBob SquigglePants is the closest any game has ever come to matching the WarioWare formula. Unfortunately, the game's lack of new ideas, content, and worthwhile 3D effects sap any value out of this sponge."

== See also ==
- List of SpongeBob SquarePants merchandise
