= Wii Remote =

Game controller for the Wii and Wii U

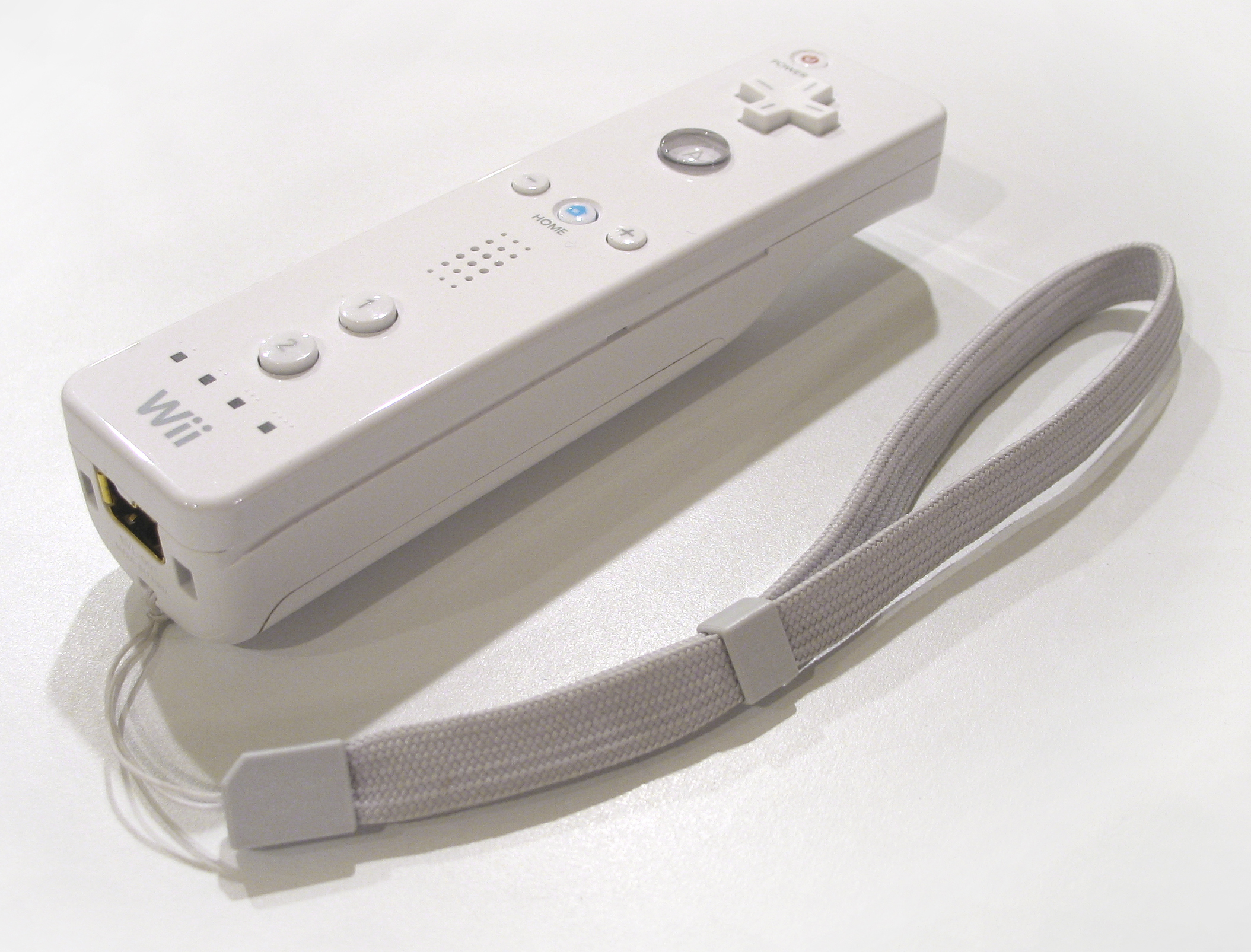
- Wii Remote with original strap
- Also known as: Wiimote; RVL-003
- Developer: Nintendo IRD
- Manufacturer: Nintendo
- Type: Motion controller
- Generation: Seventh
- Released: November 19, 2006: NA: November 19, 2006; JP: December 2, 2006; AU: December 7, 2006; EU: December 8, 2006; ZA: September 30, 2007; KR: April 26, 2008; TW: July 12, 2008; IND: September 30, 2008; HK: December 12, 2009
- Discontinued: Yes
- Storage: 16 kB EEPROM chip (16.3 kilobytes)
- Sound: 1 speaker
- Input: Accelerometer; Gyroscope (with Wii MotionPlus adapter or Wii Remote Plus); Infrared sensor; 8 digital buttons (A, B, −, +, HOME, 1, 2, POWER); D-pad
- Connectivity: Bluetooth 2.0; Accessory connector port (400 kHz I²C)
- Power: 2 × AA battery
- Predecessor: GameCube controller
- Successor: Wii U GamePad

The Wii Remote (Note: Wii Rimokon /wiːɾimokoɰ̃/ (Wiiリモコン)) (model number: RVL-003, colloquially abbreviated as the Wiimote) is the primary game controller for Nintendo's Wii home video game console. An essential capability of the Wii Remote is its motion sensing capability, which allows the user to interact with and manipulate items on screen via motion sensing, gesture recognition, and pointing using an accelerometer and optical sensor technology. It is expandable by adding attachments. The attachment bundled with the Wii console is the Nunchuk, which complements the Wii Remote by providing functions similar to those in gamepad controllers. Some other attachments include the Classic Controller, Wii Zapper, and the Wii Wheel, which was originally released with the racing game Mario Kart Wii.

The controller was revealed at the Tokyo Game Show on September 14, 2005, with the name "Wii Remote" announced April 27, 2006. The finalized version of the controller was later shown at E3 2006. It received much attention due to its unique features, supported by other gaming controllers.

The Wii's successor console, the Wii U, supports the Wii Remote and its peripherals in games where use of the features of the Wii U GamePad is not mandated. The Wii U's successor, the Nintendo Switch, features a follow-up named Joy-Con.

== History ==
Development of a motion-enabled controller began when development of the Wii console started in 2001. In that year, Nintendo licensed a number of motion-sensing patents from Gyration Inc., a company that produces wireless motion-sensing computer mice. Gyration had previously pitched their idea and patents of a motion controller to Sony and Microsoft, who both declined. Nintendo then commissioned Gyration to create a one-handed controller for it, which eventually became the "Gyropod", a more traditional gamepad which allowed its right half to break away for motion-control. At this point, Gyration brought in a separate design firm, Bridge Design, to help pitch its concept to Nintendo. Under requirement to "roughly preserve the existing GameCube button layout", it experimented with different forms "through sketches, models and interviewing various hardcore gamers". By "late 2004, early 2005", however, Nintendo had come up with the Wii Remote's less traditional "wand shape", and the design of the Nunchuk attachment. Nintendo had also decided upon using a motion sensor, infrared pointer, and the layout of the buttons, and by the end of 2005 the controller was ready for mass production.

During development of the Wii Remote, video game designer Shigeru Miyamoto brought in mobile phones and controllers for automotive navigation systems for inspiration, eventually producing a prototype that resembled a cell phone. Another design featured both an analog stick and a touchscreen, but Nintendo rejected the idea of a touchscreen on the controller, "since the portable console and living-room console would have been exactly the same". Coincidentally, this idea would later be implemented on the Wii U's GamePad controller, as well as the Nintendo Switch.

Sources also indicate that the Wii Remote was originally in development as a controller for the GameCube, rather than the Wii. Video game developer Factor 5 stated that during development of launch title Star Wars Rogue Squadron II: Rogue Leader, it had an early prototype of a motion-sensing controller. Video game journalist Matt Casamassina, from gaming website IGN, stated that he believed that Nintendo had planned to release the Wii Remote for the GameCube, noting that "Nintendo said that it hoped that GCN could enjoy a longer life cycle with the addition of top-secret peripherals that would forever enhance the gameplay experience." He suggested that Nintendo may have wanted to release the Wii Remote with a new system, instead of onto the GameCube, as "[the] Revolution addresses one of the GameCube's biggest drawbacks, which is that it was/is perceived as a toy." Images of the GameCube prototype of the Wii Remote, including the Nunchuk, were found online in October 2018 when one of the prototypes was made available through an online auction.

=== Counterfeit units ===
As the Wii gained in popularity, reports surfaced of counterfeit Wii Remotes entering circulation. Although these devices may provide the same functionality as official Wii Remotes, the build quality is typically inferior and components such as the rumble motor and speaker are noticeably different. It is also unclear whether official accessories operate correctly with counterfeit units due to the differences in internal components.

== Design ==
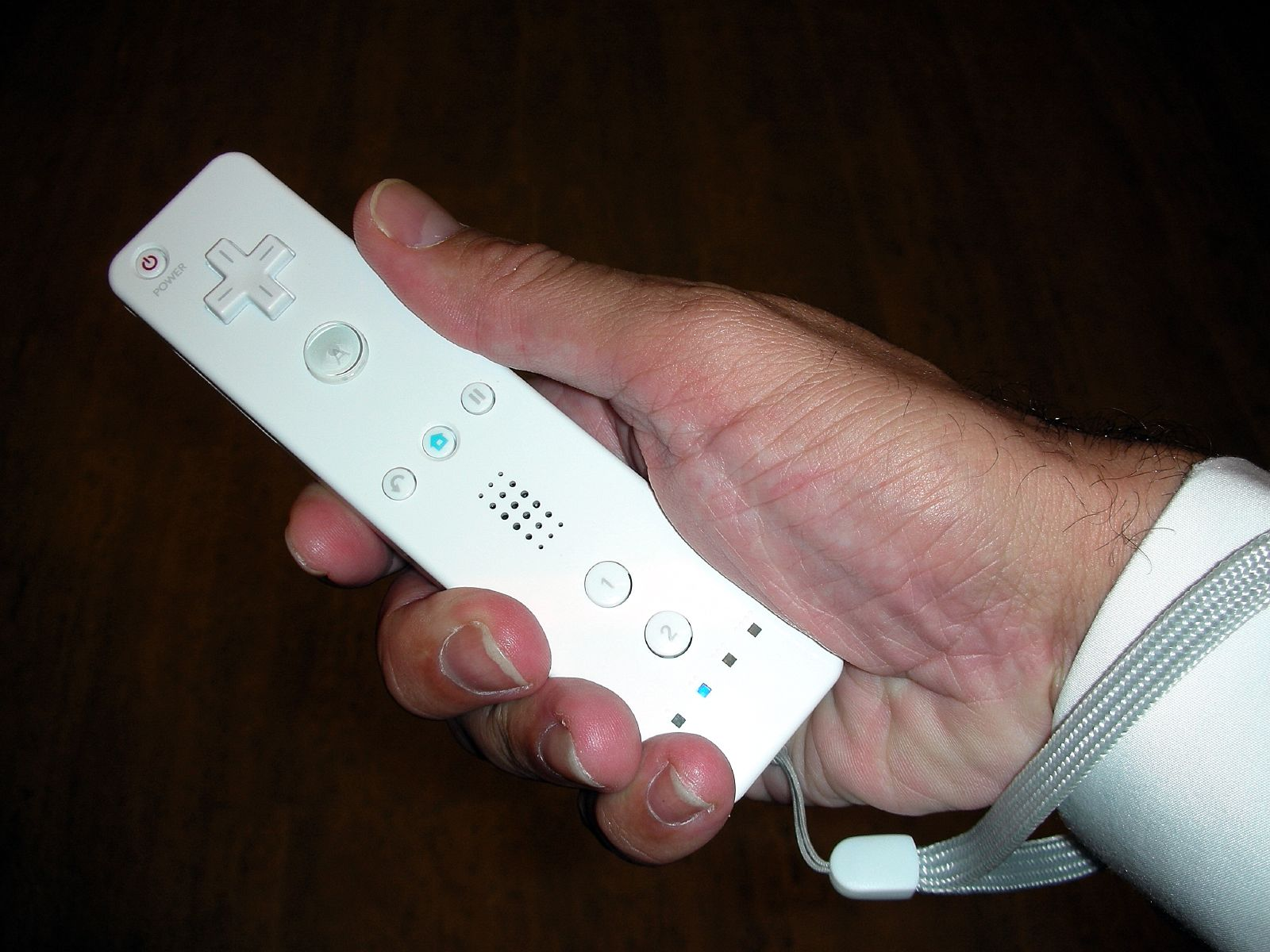
Demo Wii Remote shown at a Nintendo event at the Hotel Puerta America

The Wii Remote assumes a one-handed remote control-based design instead of the traditional gamepad controllers of previous gaming consoles. This was done to make motion sensitivity more intuitive, as a remote design is fitted perfectly for pointing, and in part to help the console appeal to a broader audience that includes non-gamers. The body of the Wii Remote is 147 mm (5.8 in) long, 36.2 mm (1.43 in) wide, and 30.8 mm (1.21 in) thick. The Wii Remote model number is RVL-003, a reference to the project code-name "Revolution". The controller communicates wirelessly with the console via short-range Bluetooth radio, with which it is possible to operate up to four controllers at a distance of up to 30 feet (10 meters) from the console. The Wii Remote communicates with the Sensor Bar by infrared, providing pointing functionality over a distance of up to five metres (16 ft) from Wii Remote to Sensor Bar. The controller can be used in either hand; it can also be turned horizontally and used like a Nintendo Entertainment System controller, or in some cases (including Excite Truck (2006), Sonic and the Secret Rings (2007), Mario Kart Wii (2008), and Sonic & Sega All-Stars Racing (2010)) as a steering wheel. It is also possible to play a single-player game with a Wii Remote in each hand, as in the Shooting Range game contained in Wii Play (2006).

At E3 2006, a few minor changes were made to the controller from the design presented at the Game Developer's Conference. The controller was made slightly longer, and a speaker was added to the face beneath the center row of buttons. The B button became more curved resembling a trigger. The "Start" and "Select" buttons were changed to plus + and minus –, and the b and a buttons were changed to 1 and 2 to differentiate them from the A and B buttons, while also evoking the keypad of typical television remotes. Also, the symbol on the HOME button was changed from a blue dot to a shape resembling a home/house, the shape of POWER was made circular rather than rectangular, and the blue LEDs indicating player number are now labeled using 1 to 4 small raised dots instead of numbers 1 to 4, resembling the dots used to mark the four controller ports of the GameCube console. The Nintendo logo at the bottom of the controller face was replaced with the Wii logo. Also, the expansion port was redesigned, with expansion plugs featuring a smaller snap-on design. The Wii Remote had the capability of turning the main console's power on or off remotely with a power button, further reinforcing the impression that it looks like a television remote.

The blue LEDs also indicate the battery's state: on pressing any button (other than the power button) while the controller is not being used to play games, four LEDs flash to indicate full battery, three for 75%, two for 50%, and one for 25% life remaining.

Similarities have been noted between the Wii Remote and an early Dreamcast controller prototype.

In the Red Steel trailer shown at E3 2006, the Wii Remote had a smaller circular shaped image sensor instead of the larger opaque IR filters shown on other versions. In the initial teaser video that revealed the controller at Tokyo Game Show 2005, the 1 and 2 buttons were labeled X and Y.

=== Strap ===
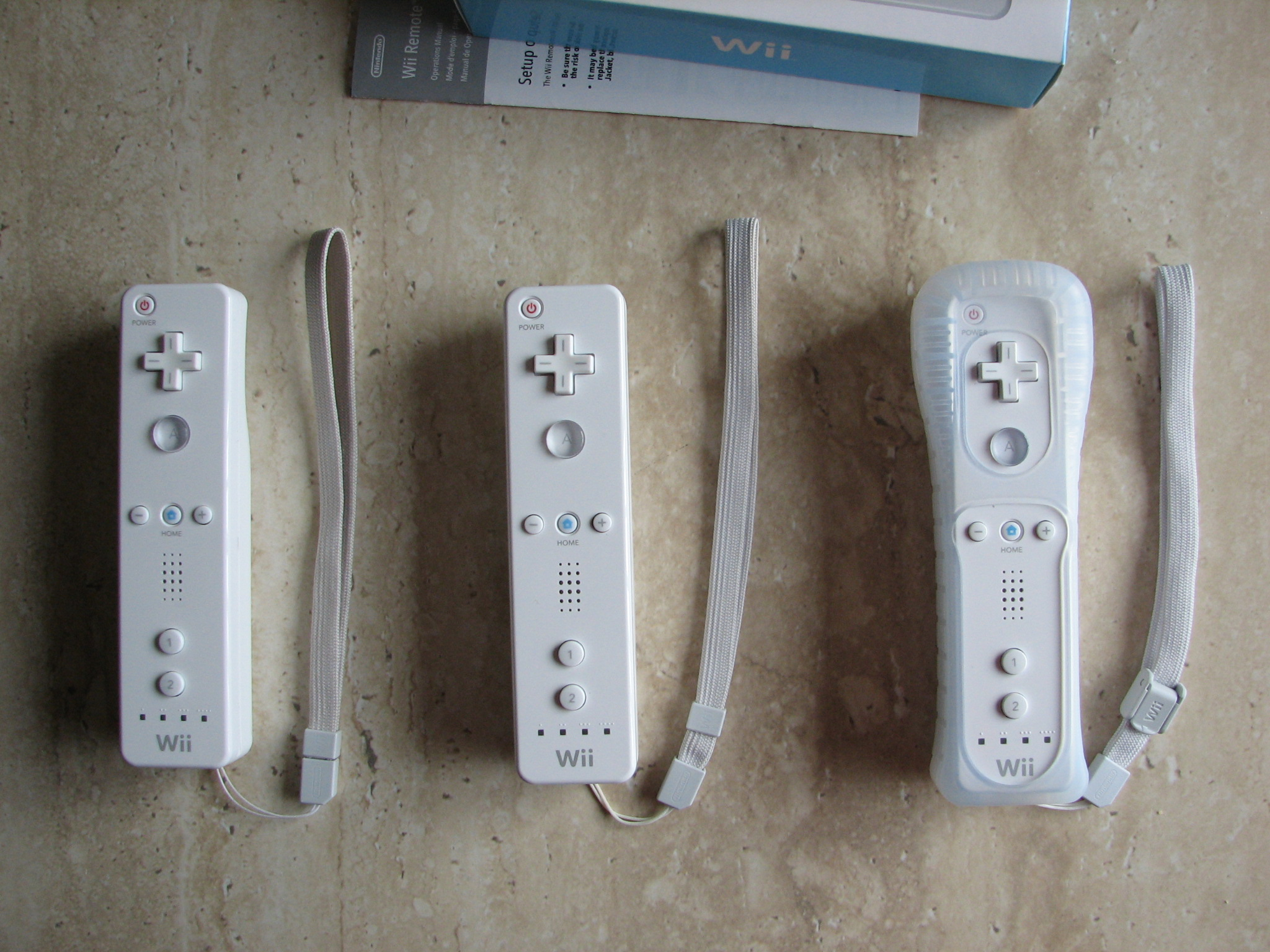
Left: Wii Remote with original wrist strap Middle: Wii Remote with thicker wrist strap Right: Wii Remote with jacket and new wrist strap

The Wii Remote has a wrist strap attached to the bottom to prevent it from flying away during game action if not held securely. The wrist strap is tied with a cow hitch knot. Every Wii game contains safety warnings concerning wrist strap use during its startup sequence and also at or near the beginning of its instruction booklet (even if the game does not use motion controls). The latter is a word-for-word reproduction of a standard wrist strap warning notice established by Nintendo. The wrist strap is also used to restrain the Nunchuk's connector by its hook, safely slowing any sudden movement of the Nunchuk's cord if the connector is forcibly disconnected. In spite of widespread wrist strap safety notices, there are certain Wii games, in whole or part, that are played by moving the Wii Remote in such a way that would be hindered by a wrist strap, such as Let's Tap (2008), most House Party games in Wii Party (2010) and the Treasure Twirl game in Wii Play: Motion (2011). In such games, on-screen prompts as well as instruction booklet text, will specifically state that they must be played without the wrist strap.

Video game website IGN reported that the strap tends to break under heavy use, which would potentially send the Wii Remote flying. WarioWare: Smooth Moves (2006) also sometimes requires the Wii Remote to be dropped, which would cause problems in the event of a strap failure. In response, Nintendo has posted guidelines on proper use of the strap and the Wii Remote. On December 8, 2006, units with thicker straps began to appear in some areas of the world. On December 15, 2006, Nintendo denied reports of a Wii wrist strap recall. Despite this, it replaced broken wrist straps free of charge. The U.S. Consumer Product Safety Commission became involved in the "replacement program". The old 0.6 mm (0.024 in) diameter strap is replaced by a larger, 1.0 mm (0.039 in) diameter version. Nintendo's online "Wrist Strap Replacement Request Form" allows owners to receive up to four free straps when a Wii serial number and shipping details are provided.

On August 3, 2007, a new wrist strap was found to be supplied, with a lock clip instead of a movable slide to prevent the strap from working loose during prolonged play; the lock clip strap became the standard form.

With the release of the Wii U on November 18, 2012, the wrist strap was once again updated to allow users to push the sync button through the new jackets and battery covers.

=== Jacket ===
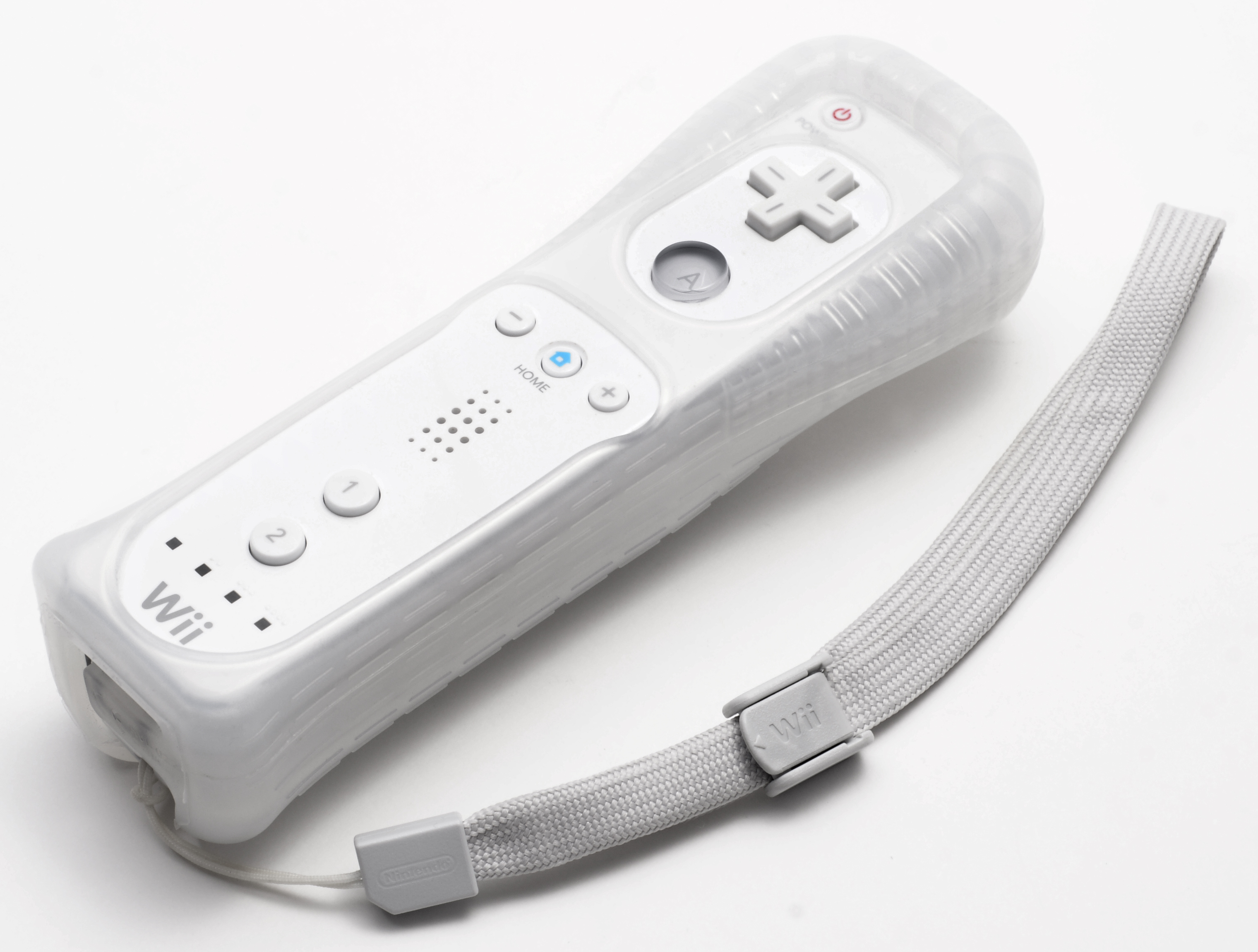
Jacket on Wii Remote

Nintendo announced a free accessory for the Wii Remote, the Wii Remote Jacket, on October 1, 2007. The removable silicone sleeve wraps around the Wii Remote to provide a better grip, and cushioning to protect the Wii Remote if dropped. Nintendo started including the jacket with the controller on October 15, 2007. The safety jacket included with every Wii Remote is usually translucent. However, for black Wii Remotes and red Wii Remote Plus controllers, the safety jacket would be of the same color.

The original Wii MotionPlus accessory also comes with a built-in safety jacket that is unsafe to remove, according to Nintendo.

=== Colors ===
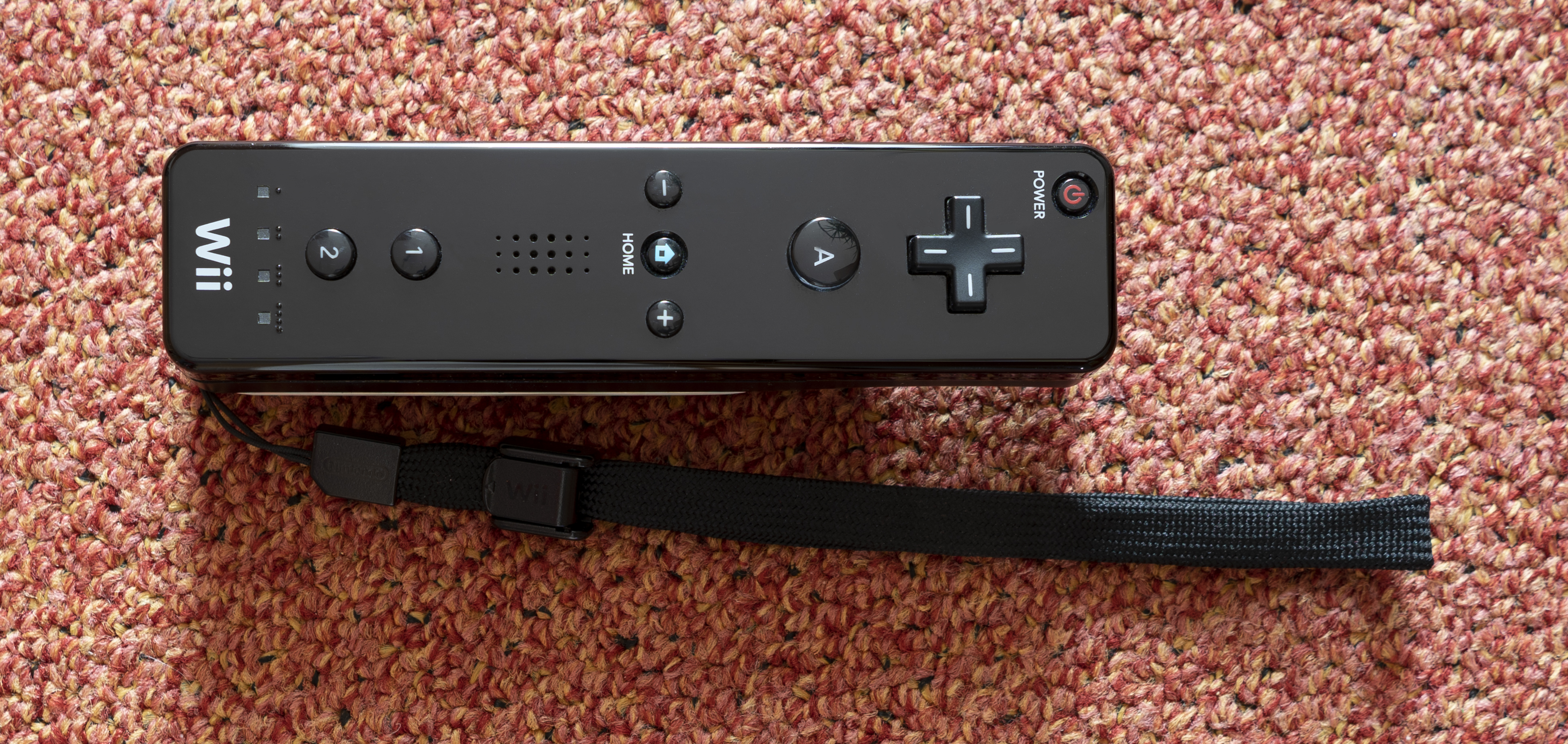
Black Wii Remote with matching wrist strap

At the E3 2006 trade show, Nintendo displayed white, black, and blue controllers; press images released for the event featured white, red, silver, lime green, and black versions. The Wii console and controllers launched in only white versions, with Shigeru Miyamoto commenting that new hues would be provided when supplies became available.

On June 4, 2009, Nintendo revealed that it would release black versions of the Wii, Wii Remote, Nunchuk, and Classic Controller Pro in Japan on August 1, 2009. Each black Wii Remote includes a matching solid-black Wii Remote Jacket. In addition, Club Nintendo in Japan held a contest between June 25, 2009, and August 31, 2009, wherein members who purchased and registered a copy of Wii Sports Resort (2009) would be entered into a draw to win one of 5,000 blue controller sets. Each set included a Wii Remote, Wii MotionPlus, and Nunchuk, all in a sky blue color referred to as Mizuiro and distinct from other blue Wii Remotes.

For North America, Nintendo announced on September 1, 2009, that black versions of the Wii Remote, Wii MotionPlus, and Nunchuk would be released during the holiday season. On November 16, 2009, the black Wii Remote and Wii MotionPlus was released as a bundle, and the black Nunchuk was released as a standalone purchase.

Blue and pink Wii Remotes were released alongside New Super Mario Bros. Wii and Samurai Warriors 3 in Japan on December 3, 2009. In North America, the blue and pink Wii Remotes were released February 14, 2010, in a bundle with a standard white Wii MotionPlus.

In Australia, the black, blue and pink versions of the Wii Remotes were released on February 25, 2010. In addition, the black Nunchuk and black Wii MotionPlus were also released on that day as well.

When Nintendo released the Wii Remote Plus in late 2010, which featured built-in Wii MotionPlus technology, it would initially be available in the same four standard Wii Remote colors, plus a special red variant that was included with red Wii consoles manufactured to celebrate the 25th anniversary of Super Mario Bros.. In the years that followed, Nintendo released more Wii Remote Plus color schemes based on its first-party game franchises.

== Features ==
=== Sensing ===
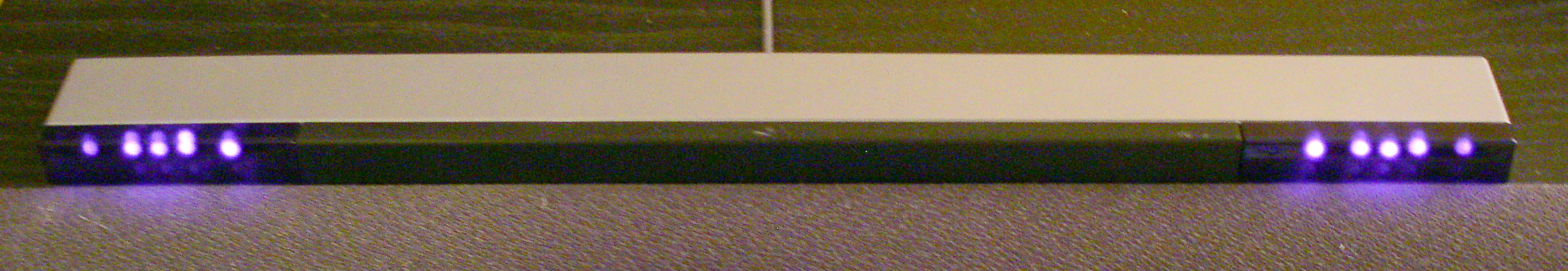
Sensor Bar highlighting IR LEDs taken with a camera sensitive to infrared. The lights coming from the edges of the bar are not visible to the human eye, just Wii Remotes and any other equipment that can sense IR light sources, including most digital cameras.

The Wii Remote has the ability to sense acceleration along three axes through the use of MEMS-based three-dimensional accelerometers from manufacturer Analog Devices.

The Wii Remote also has a PixArt optical sensor that allows it to determine where it is pointing. Unlike a light gun that senses light from a television screen, the Wii Remote senses light from the console's Sensor Bar (RVL-014), which allows consistent usage not influenced by the screen used. The Sensor Bar is about 24 cm (9.4 in) long and has ten infrared LEDs, five at each end of the bar. The LEDs farthest from the center are pointed slightly outwards, the LEDs closest to the center are pointed slightly inwards, while the rest are pointed straight forward. The Sensor Bar's cable is 353 cm (11 ft 7 in) in length. The bar may be placed above or below the television, centered horizontally, in line with the front of the television or the front of the surface the television is placed on. The Remote should be pointed approximately towards the Sensor Bar; precise pointing is not necessary so long as it is within the limited viewing angle of the Wii Remote.

Use of the Sensor Bar allows the Wii Remote to be used as an accurate pointing device up to 5 meters (approx. 16 ft) away from the bar. The Wii Remote's image sensor is used to locate the Sensor Bar's points of light in the Wii Remote's field of view. The light emitted from each end of the Sensor Bar is focused onto the image sensor which sees the light as two bright dots separated by a distance "mi" on the image sensor. The second distance "m" between the two clusters of light emitters in the Sensor Bar is a fixed distance. From these two distances m and mi, the Wii CPU calculates the distance between the Wii Remote and the Sensor Bar using triangulation. Rotation of the Wii Remote with respect to the ground can also be calculated from the relative angle of the two dots of light on the image sensor. Games can be programmed to sense whether the image sensor is covered, which is demonstrated in a microgame featured in WarioWare: Smooth Moves (2006), where if the player does not uncover the sensor the champagne bottle that the remote represents will not open.

The Sensor Bar is required when the Wii Remote is controlling up-down, left-right motion of a cursor or reticle on the TV screen to point to menu options or objects such as enemies in first-person shooters. Some Wii games that depend on infrared pointing, such as The Conduit (2009) and The House of the Dead 2 & 3 Return (2008), allow the player to calibrate the Wii Remote's pointer in-game. Because the Sensor Bar allows the Wii Remote to calculate the distance between the Wii Remote and the Sensor Bar, the Wii Remote can also control slow forward-backward motion of an object in a 3-dimensional game. Rapid forward-backward motion, such as punching in a boxing game, is controlled by the acceleration sensors. Using these acceleration sensors (acting as tilt sensors), the Wii Remote can also control rotation of a cursor or other objects.

The use of an infrared sensor to detect position can cause some detection problems in the presence of other infrared sources, such as incandescent light bulbs or candles. This can be alleviated by using fluorescent or LED lights, which emit little to no infrared light, around the Wii. Innovative users have used other sources of IR light, such as a pair of flashlights or a pair of candles, as Sensor Bar substitutes. The Wii Remote picks up traces of heat from the sensor, then transmits it to the Wii console to control the pointer on your screen. Such substitutes for the Sensor Bar illustrate the fact that a pair of non-moving lights provide continuous calibration of the direction that the Wii Remote is pointing and its physical location relative to the light sources. There is no way to calibrate the position of the cursor relative to where the user is pointing the controller without the two stable reference sources of light provided by the Sensor Bar or substitutes. Third-party wireless sensor bars have also been released, which have been popular with users of Wii emulators since the official Sensor Bar utilizes a proprietary connector to connect to the Wii console.

The position and motion tracking of the Wii Remote allows the player to mimic actual game actions, such as swinging a sword or aiming a gun, instead of simply pressing buttons. An early marketing video showed actors miming actions such as fishing, cooking, drumming, conducting a musical ensemble, shooting a gun, sword fighting, and performing dental surgery.

The LEDs can be seen by some digital cameras, phone cameras, and other devices with a wider visible spectrum than the human eye.

=== Controller feedback ===
The Wii Remote provides basic audio and rumble (vibration) functionality, but the Nunchuk does not. At the 2006 E3 press conference, it was revealed that the Wii Remote has its own independent speaker on the face of the unit. This was demonstrated by a developer as he strung and shot a bow in The Legend of Zelda: Twilight Princess (2006). The sound from both the Wii Remote and television was altered as the bow shot to give the impression of the arrow traveling away from the player. In addition to reproducing certain in-game sound effects that reflect the on-screen action, the Wii Remote speaker can also function as a voice receiver through which non-player characters can speak to the player with long-distance telecommunication, featured in games like Red Steel (2006), Real Heroes: Firefighter (2009) and GoldenEye 007 (2010). Some party games and hotseat multiplayer games also utilize the speaker to indicate changes between player turns. The volume can be changed or muted with the "Home" button and selecting the corresponding controller icon at the bottom of the screen; if the speaker is muted, any sounds intended to be emitted from the speaker will come from the television in most cases. The rumble feature can also be switched on or off using the Home Menu.

=== Memory ===
The Wii Remote contains a 16 KiB EEPROM chip of which a section of 6 kilobytes can be read and written to by the host. Part of this memory is available to store up to ten Mii avatars, which can be transported to use with another Wii console (but it can be used to upload Miis to the Mii Parade and keep it on the console (by copying Mii to remote, moving Mii to parade from console, and then moving from remote to the console)). 4,000 bytes are available for game use before the Mii data. Pokémon Battle Revolution and Super Swing Golf (both 2006) also use this memory. This function is also used in Super Smash Bros. Brawl (2008), allowing the user to save controller configuration data to the Wii Remote. Monster Hunter Tri (2009) also uses this function by allowing players to save their profiles to the Wii Remote. Pokémon Rumble (2009) uses this section to store Pokémon. Carnival Games: Mini Golf (2008) and Club Penguin: Game Day! (2010) as well as other games use this to store the player's in game avatars. The game Petz: Monkey Madness allows players to transport their monkey between copies of the game.

=== Power source ===
The Wii Remote uses two AA size alkaline batteries as a power source, which can power a Wii Remote for 60 hours using only the accelerometer functionality and 25 hours using both accelerometer and pointer functionality. In May 2013, Nintendo announced a rechargeable battery and dock accessory, and various third-party manufacturers market charging solutions for the controller (see Wii Remote Chargers). Nintendo's industrial designer Lance Barr said that the Wii Remote's expansion port is unsuitable for internal battery charging. The only type of (externally charged) rechargeable battery supported is nickel-metal hydride (NiMH). A 3300 μF capacitor provides a temporary source of power during quick movements of the Wii Remote when connection to the batteries may be temporarily interrupted. If the Wii Remote is not used for more than 5 minutes, such as when the player is using a GameCube controller, it will shut off, and can be re-activated by pressing any button (this was also the case when using a now discontinued video-on-demand service). Games are able to determine and react to the current battery life of Wii Remotes, with certain games using unique, extra-diegetic methods of alerting the player to low battery life.

== Wii Remote Plus ==
Wii Remote Plus
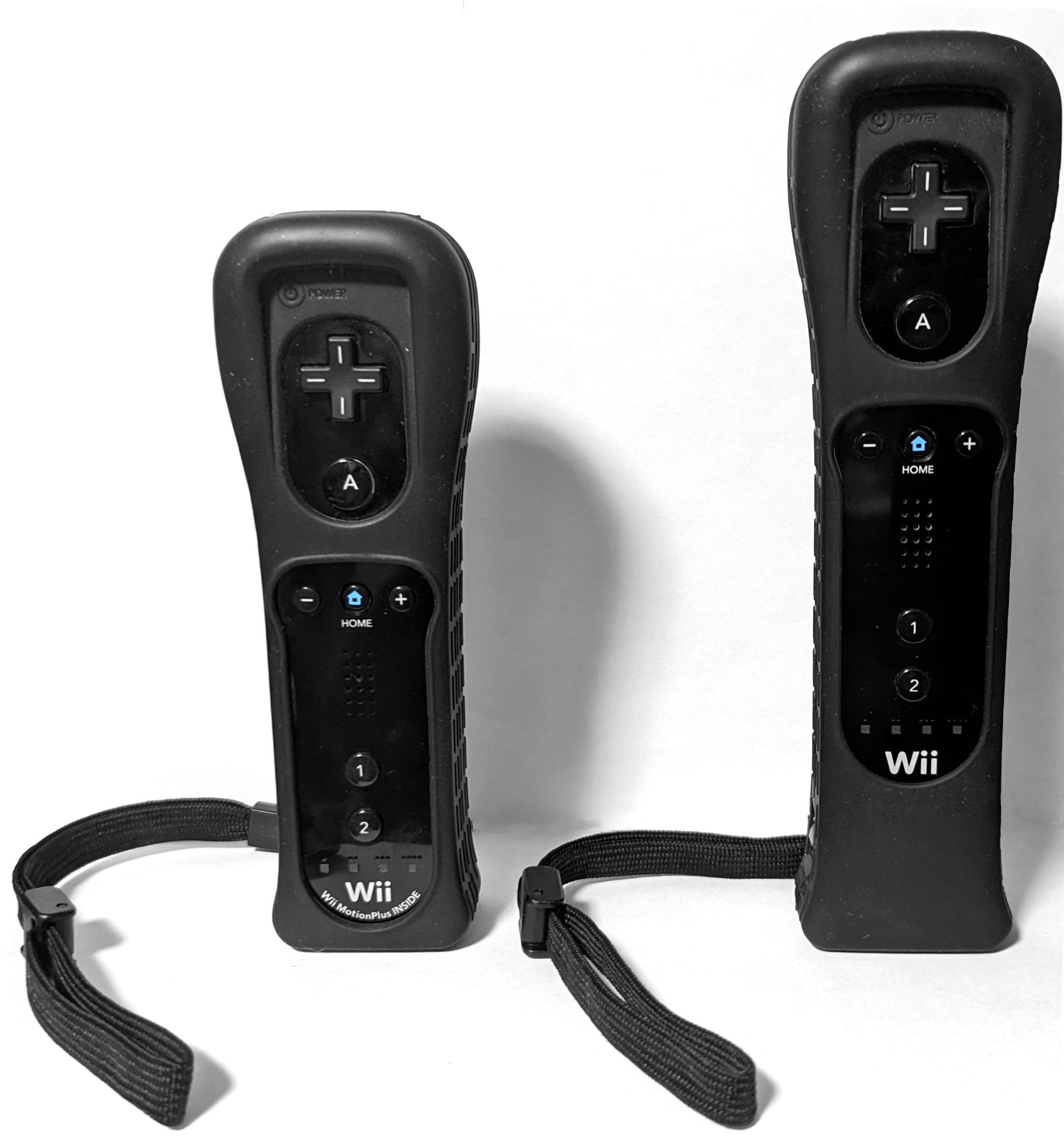
- A Wii Remote Plus (left) and Wii Remote with Wii MotionPlus accessory (right)
- Also known as: Wiimote Plus; RVL-036
- Developer: Nintendo IRD
- Manufacturer: Nintendo
- Type: Motion controller
- Generation: Seventh
- Released: AU: October 28, 2010; EU: November 5, 2010; NA: November 7, 2010; JP: November 11, 2010
- Discontinued: Yes
- Sound: 1 speaker
- Input: Accelerometer; Gyroscope; Infrared sensor; Digital buttons (A, B, −, +, HOME, 1, 2, Power); D-pad
- Connectivity: Bluetooth; Accessory connector port
- Power: 2 × AA Battery
- Predecessor: Wii Remote with Motion Plus accessory
- Successor: Wii U GamePad; Joy-Con

In September 2010, rumors were circulating of a Wii Remote with Wii MotionPlus already built in after the box art for the upcoming FlingSmash revealed it to be bundled with "Wii Remote Plus". Nintendo initially declined to comment, but later announced the device on September 29, 2010, confirming it to be a Wii Remote with MotionPlus built in, allowing players to use peripherals like the Wii Zapper and Wii Wheel and comfortably use the Wii Remote horizontally without having to remove the Wii MotionPlus attachment from the Wii Remote. The Wii Remote Plus competed with Microsoft's Kinect and Sony Computer Entertainment's PlayStation Move with PlayStation Eye motion controllers, respectively. Nintendo later announced that the Wii Remote Plus would be available in white, black, blue and pink. It was released in Australia on October 28, 2010, in Europe on November 5, 2010, in North America on November 7, 2010, and in Japan on November 11, 2010.

=== Other colors ===
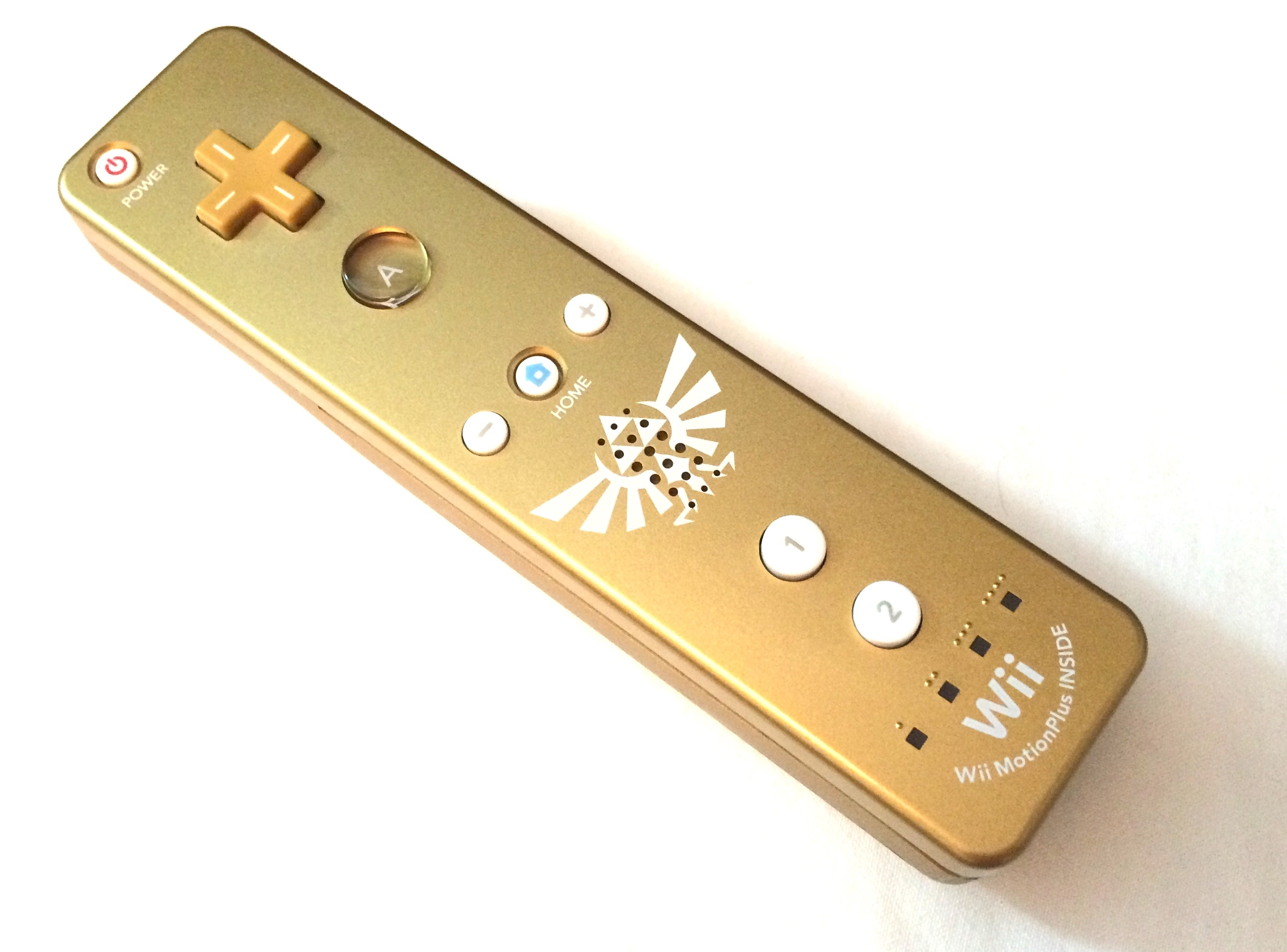
The limited edition of The Legend of Zelda: Skyward Sword (2011) was bundled with a gold-colored Wii Remote Plus.

In addition to being available in the four standard Wii Remote colors, specially colored Wii Remote Plus controllers themed after Nintendo's first-party video game franchises were also released in the years that followed, with one golden Legend of Zelda Wii Remote Plus and several others based on Mario characters. A red Wii Remote Plus, initially designed to celebrate the Mario series' 25th anniversary, was included in red Wii bundles released for the occasion along with a matching Nunchuk and console in 2010, Wii Sports (2006) and New Super Mario Bros. Wii (2009). The red Wii Remote Plus would also be bundled with European copies of Wii Play: Motion (2011), which is replaced with a black one in other regions. A red Wii Remote Plus and Nunchuk of matching color is also included with every Wii Mini.

At E3 2011, it was revealed that a gold Wii Remote Plus with the Hylian Crest superimposed over its speaker would be released alongside The Legend of Zelda: Skyward Sword. It was available as part of a bundle with Skyward Sword for a limited time, released in November 2011. In August 2012, a matching gold Nunchuk was also available to earn for Club Nintendo members for a limited time.

On November 18, 2012, the Wii Remote Plus was reissued, and branded for the Wii U, the Wii's successor. Another sync button on the battery cover was added, allowing users to sync without removing the battery cover. A year later, Nintendo began releasing Wii Remote Plus controllers that are themed after Mario characters, starting with Mario and Luigi on November 1, 2013, to accompany the release of the Wii U Deluxe set. A few months later, Nintendo released a Princess Peach-themed Wii Remote Plus, on April 24, 2014. Nintendo also released Wii Remote Plus controllers themed after Bowser, a Toad and Yoshi on September 11 and October 16, 2015 to accompany the releases of Super Mario Maker and Yoshi's Woolly World, respectively, exclusively available at GameStop.

== Expansions ==
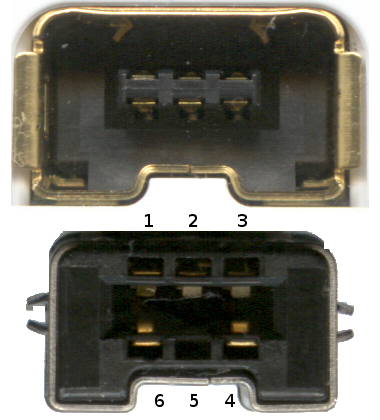
Female (top) and male (bottom) connector

The Wii Remote has an expansion port at the bottom which allows various functional attachments to be added. The connector, and any accessories that attach to it, use a 400 kHz I²C protocol. This expandability is similar to that available with the port on the Nintendo 64 controller. There is a female connector on the Wii Remote, to which expansions with a male connector can be connected.

The multiple kinds of controllers that can connect to the Wii Remote make it into a more versatile controller, opening up new Wii controller configurations and likewise multiple control schemes. Various racing games such as Mario Kart Wii and a few Need for Speed video games, as well as some fighting games like Super Smash Bros. Brawl, Tatsunoko vs. Capcom and the Naruto: Clash of Ninja Revolution trilogy take advantage of the versatility the expansion port confers to offer multiple control schemes to suit different kinds of players.

=== Nunchuk ===
Nunchuk
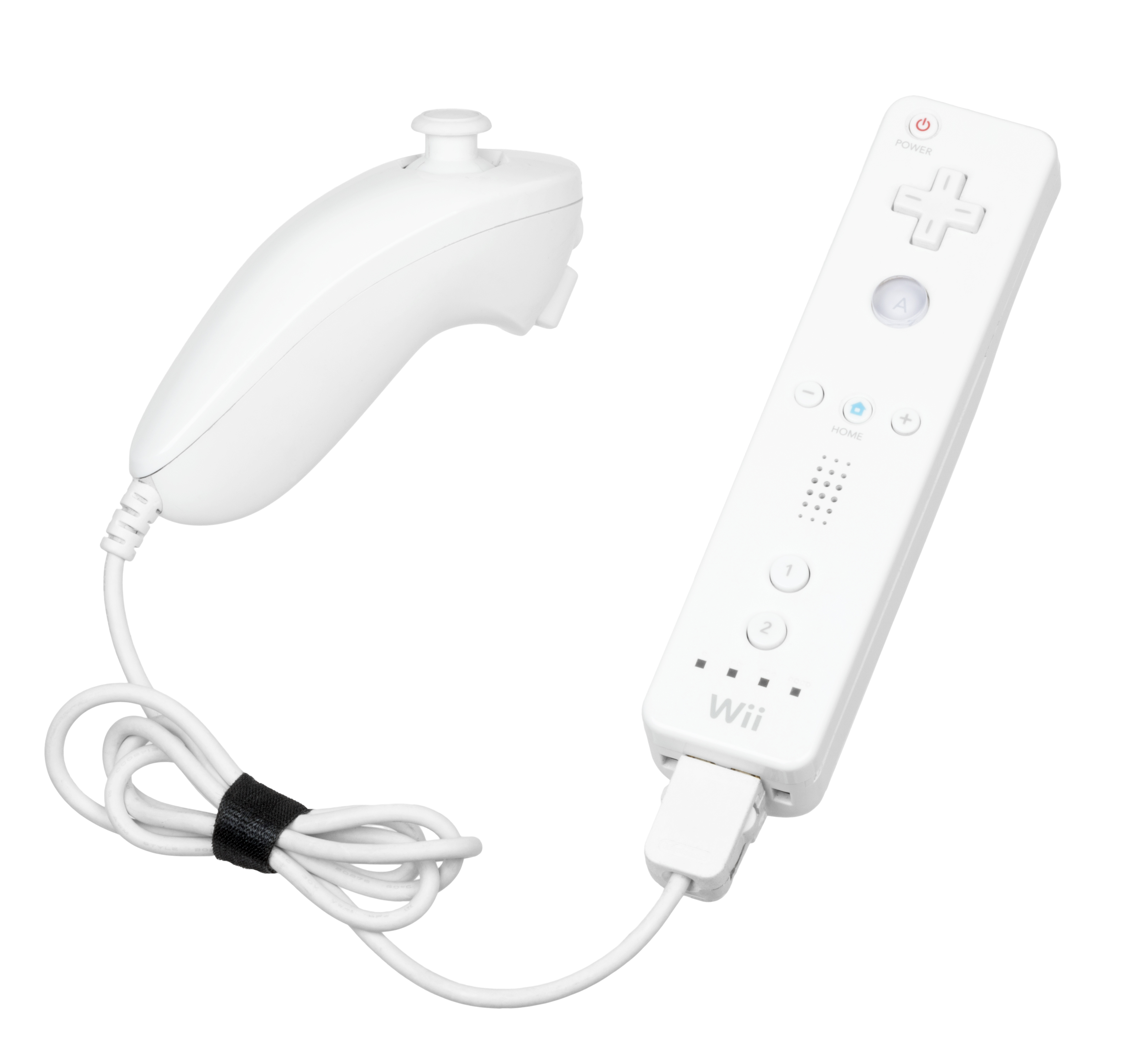
- Also known as: RVL-004
- Developer: Nintendo IRD
- Manufacturer: Nintendo
- Type: Device expansion
- Generation: Seventh
- Released: November 19, 2006: NA: November 19, 2006; JP: December 2, 2006; AU: December 7, 2006; EU: December 8, 2006; ZA: September 30, 2007; KR: April 26, 2008; TW: July 12, 2008; IND: September 30, 2008; HK: December 12, 2009
- Discontinued: Yes
- Input: Analog stick; 2 × digital buttons (C, Z); Accelerometer
- Connectivity: Accessory connector plug for Wii Remote

The Nunchuk (model number: RVL-004) was the first attachment Nintendo revealed for the Wii Remote at the 2005 Tokyo Game Show. It connects to the Wii Remote via a cord 1 to 1.2 m (3.5 to 4 feet) long. Its appearance when attached resembles the nunchaku weapon, hence the name. It also resembles the middle handle of the Nintendo 64 controller. Like the controllers of the Wii's two predecessors, the Nunchuk has an analog stick whose movement is restricted by an octagonal area. The Nunchuk also has two trigger buttons (a last-minute modification changed the two triggers to one trigger and a C button, as described below). It works in tandem with the main controller in many games. Like the Wii Remote, the Nunchuk also provides a three-axis accelerometer from STMicroelectronics for motion-sensing and tilting, but lacks any feedback features. The presence of a motion sensor in the Nunchuk allows the Wii controller to recognize gestures from both of the player's hands independently, a feature that is leveraged to implement boxing controls for Wii Sports or dual wield combat in some hack and slash games, such as Prince of Persia: Rival Swords. Despite having fewer buttons, the Nunchuk can also be used as a controller itself, a feature that is leveraged by Opoona, Bust-A-Move Bash! and SpeedZone. This allows two players to share a single Wii controller, enabling the multiplayer modes of Bash! and SpeedZone to support five to eight players across the maximum four Wii controllers that can be synced to a single console.

One Nunchuk comes bundled with the Wii console. Additional Wii Remote units are sold separately without the Nunchuk. The two shoulder buttons, formerly named Z1 and Z2 respectively, have been reshaped and renamed from the Game Developers Conference on. The circular top shoulder button, now called C, is much smaller than the lower rectangular shoulder button, now called Z.

The body of the Nunchuk is 113 mm (4.4 in) long, 38 mm (1.5 in) wide, and 37 mm (1.5 in) thick. The connection port also has a larger size.

The Nunchuk can be connected to any microcontroller capable of I²C (e.g., Arduino's Atmel AVR), where the accelerometer, joystick and buttons data may be accessed. Todbot has created the Wiichuk, an adapter to facilitate connecting the Nunchuk to an Arduino board.

In 2008, wireless Nunchuks became available from third party providers, not requiring the cord that links the Wii Remote with the Nunchuk.

The Nunchuk is generally available in white and black. Sky blue Nunchuks were available in Japan from 2009 as a prize for a contest used to promote Wii Sports Resort. Red Nunchuks were released from 2010 and are bundled with the red Mario anniversary Wii console and Wii Mini. Blue Nunchuks are bundled with the European blue Wii Family Edition consoles with the inclusion of Mario & Sonic at the London 2012 Olympic Games released on November 18, 2011. A gold Nunchuk was offered to Club Nintendo members for a limited time in 2011 to complement Skyward Sword's gold Wii Remote Plus.

=== Classic Controller ===
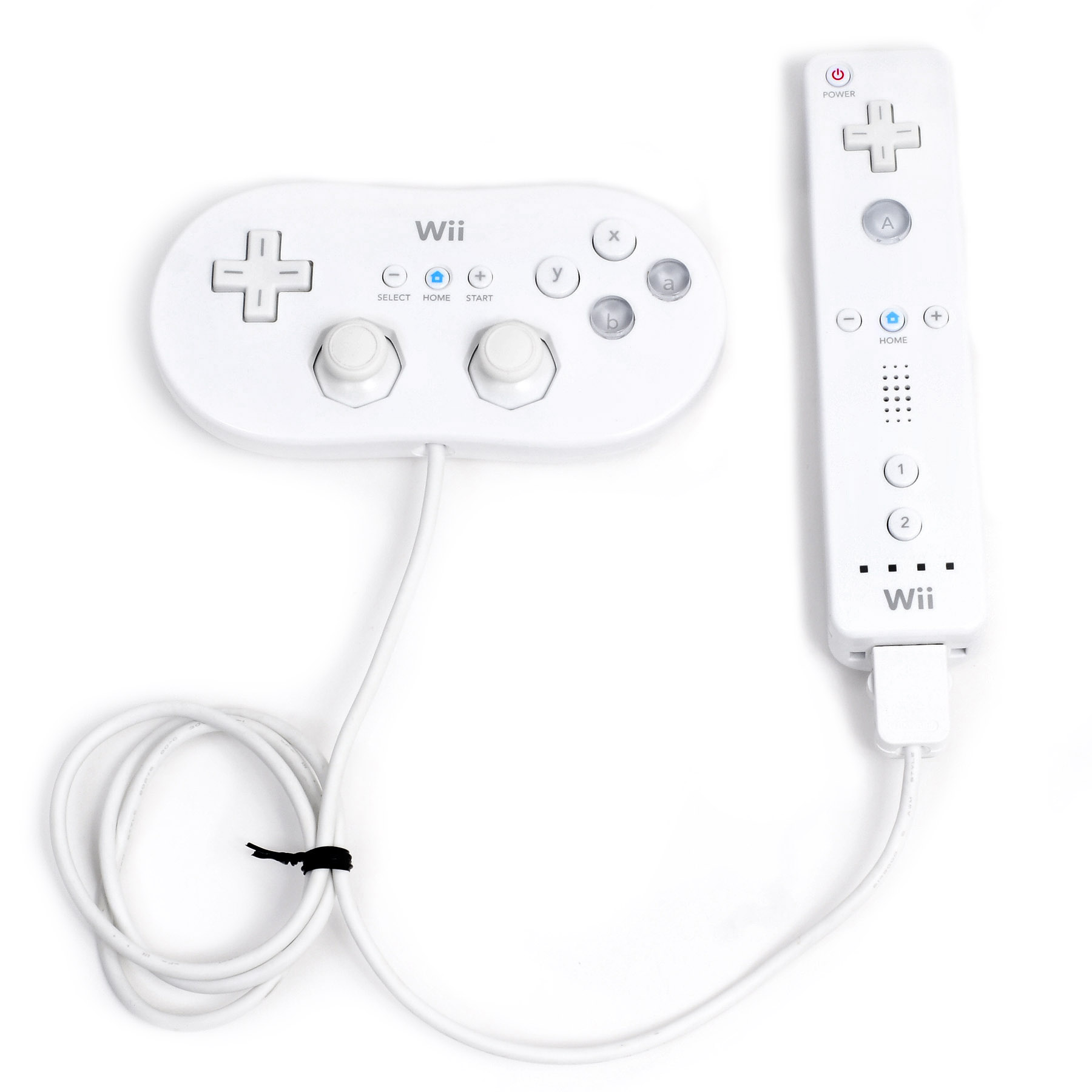
The Wii Classic Controller (left) is designed to be connected to the Wii Remote (right) expansion port.

There are two versions of the Classic Controller, the original Classic Controller and the Classic Controller Pro.

At the 2006 Electronic Entertainment Expo Nintendo introduced the Classic Controller, which plugs into the Wii Remote via a cord in a similar fashion to the Nunchuk. Unlike most accessories, the Classic Controller largely usurps the Remote's functionality, with the Remote's buttons duplicated on the Controller. The Remote is used primarily as a wireless transmitter for the Controller and where applicable retains its pointing-device functionality. It can also still be used as a valid, active controller by another player in multiplayer modes of games like Bust-A-Move Bash! and SpeedZone.

The Classic Controller is reminiscent of the Super NES controller, being the same size and having the A, B, X, Y, L and R buttons and directional pad in the same location. It also contains two analog sticks and two extra shoulder buttons used to replicate additional components found on the GameCube controller. The controller is primarily used for Virtual Console titles, with several titles requiring either the Classic or GameCube controller to play, being optimized for the Classic Controller. Dozens of Wii titles are also compatible with the controller to allow for a more traditional control scheme.

=== Wii MotionPlus ===
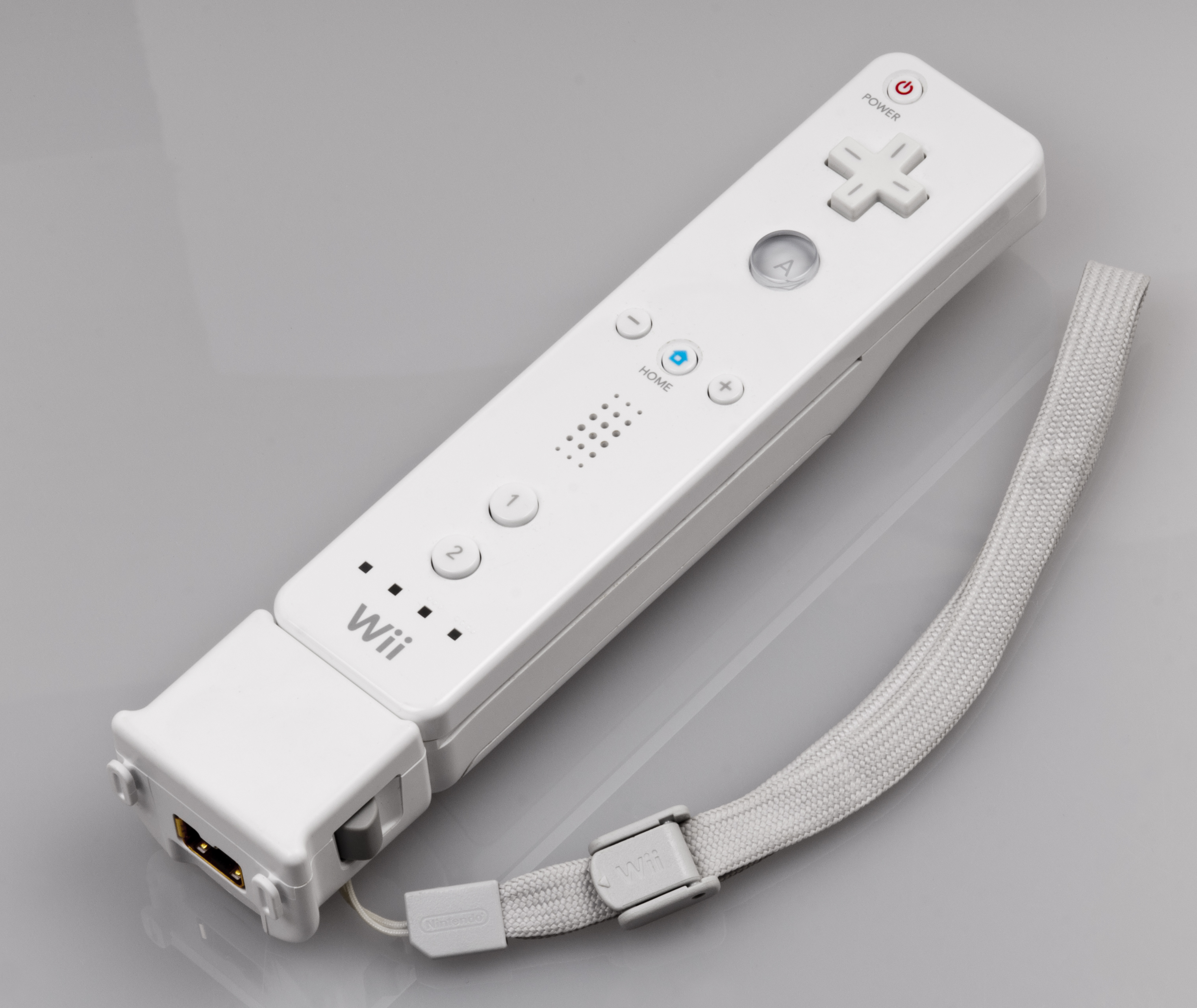
Wii MotionPlus, without its jacket, attached to the Wii Remote

The Wii MotionPlus is an expansion device that allows the Wii Remote to more accurately capture complex motion. Incorporated with a custom version of the Wii Remote Jacket, the Wii MotionPlus affixes directly to the Wii Remote expansion port, extending the length of the controller body by approximately 4 centimetres (1.6 in). The Wii MotionPlus uses a tuning fork gyroscope which supplements the accelerometer and Sensor Bar capabilities of the Wii Remote, enabling controller motions to be rendered identically on the screen in real time, according to Nintendo. It is sold separately, and also included in bundles with some MotionPlus compatible games such as Nintendo's Wii Sports Resort and Ubisoft's Red Steel 2. Sky blue Wii MotionPlus expansions were available in Japan as a prize for a contest used to promote Wii Sports Resort. Black Wii Remotes bundled with the MotionPlus add-on of matching color were released in Europe and North America in November 2009.

=== Wii Vitality Sensor ===
The Wii Vitality Sensor was a cancelled peripheral; a fingertip pulse oximeter sensor that connected through the Wii Remote. According to Nintendo, the device "will initially sense the user's pulse and a number of other signals being transmitted by their bodies, and will then provide information to the users about the body's inner world." The Wii Vitality Sensor was announced by President and CEO Satoru Iwata at Nintendo's E3 2009 media briefing on June 2, 2009. No specific applications were revealed for the device, but when presenting the device Iwata suggested that video games may soon be used for relaxation. Some press drew comparisons between the device and the Bio Sensor, a Nintendo 64 accessory created for use with Tetris 64 (1998). According to Nintendo of America president Reggie Fils-Aime, more details concerning the Wii Vitality Sensor were to be revealed during E3 2010, although in the event the device was not mentioned. Reggie told GameTrailers, "(E3) was not the kind of environment for a game based on relaxation", and said that they were saving news on the device for another time and place. At E3 2010, Ubisoft introduced their own pulse oximeter sensor, "Innergy". At E3 2011, Nintendo announced more about the Wii Vitality Sensor. Shigeru Miyamoto said that the Wii Vitality Sensor has a difficult time performing consistently across a variety of situations but still may be released.

On July 5, 2013, Satoru Iwata disclosed that the Wii Vitality Sensor project had been cancelled due to its lack of widespread compatibility, with Nintendo finding that the device failed to work with approximately 10% of people it was tested on, noting that the device "was of narrower application than we had originally thought." Iwata also mentioned the possibility of returning to the project in the future, when the technology allows for at least a 99.9% success rate.

== Accessories ==
=== Wii Zapper ===
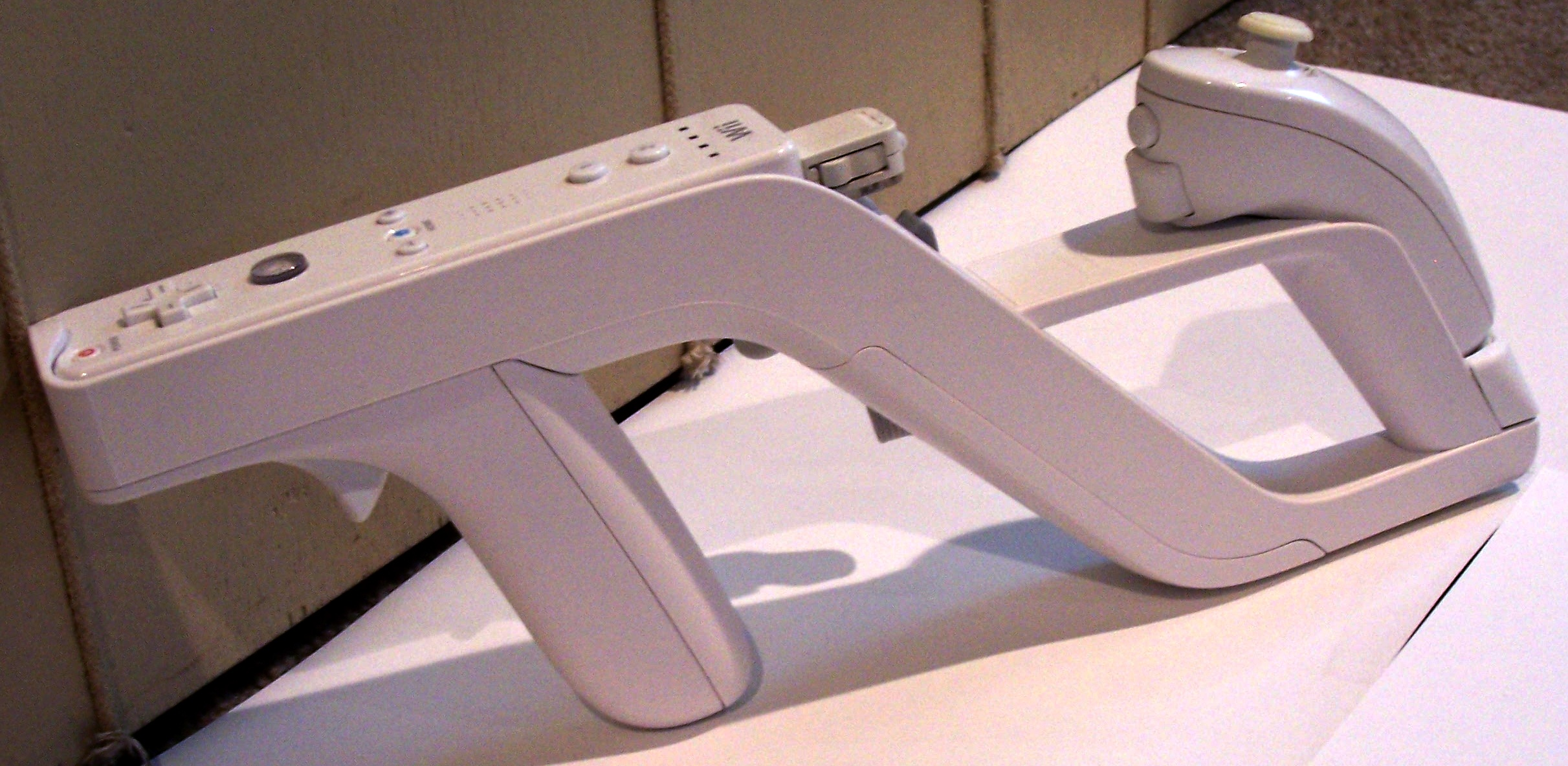
Wii Zapper with Wii Remote and Nunchuk inserted

The Wii Zapper is a gun-shaped shell accessory for the Wii Remote. As shown in the image, the shell holds both the Wii Remote and Nunchuk, and contains a trigger that actuates the Wii Remote's B button; all other buttons are still accessible while the remote and Nunchuk are in the shell. The name is a reference to the NES Zapper light gun for the Nintendo Entertainment System. According to an interview with Shigeru Miyamoto, the idea of a Zapper-type expansion formed when the Wii Remote was first created. He expressed that "What we found is that the reason we wanted to have a Zapper is when you hold a Wii Remote, it can be difficult for some people to keep a steady hand. And holding your arm out like that can get your arm somewhat tired." The Zapper is useful for most games primarily involving firearms, such as light gun shooters, first-person shooters, and third-person shooters.

=== Wii Wheel ===
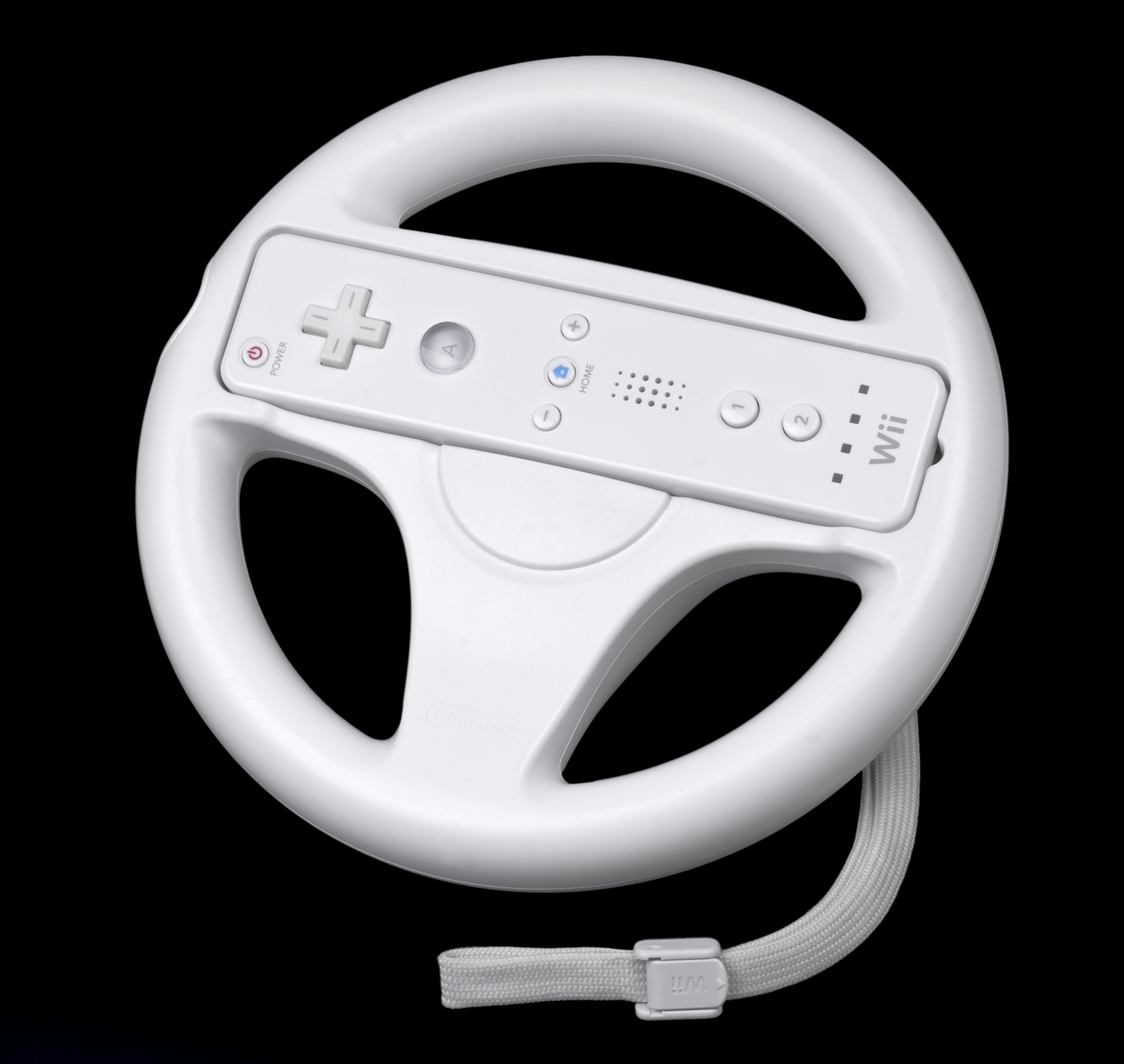
Wii Wheel with Wii Remote inserted

The Wii Wheel accessory is designed for use in driving games: it is a steering wheel-shaped shell that a Wii Remote can be placed inside, enhancing driving games that allow for steering control by tilting the Wii Remote left and right. The Wii Wheel was first shipped alongside Mario Kart Wii and features prominently on the game's packaging.

=== Third-party accessories ===
Since the release of the Wii console, many aesthetic, ergonomic, and functional accessories have been developed for the Wii Remote by third parties.

== Third-party development ==
Johnny Lee's WiiMote Whiteboard software used for light pen-type computer input

Since the release of the Wii console, people have been exploring different new ways in which to use the Wii Remote. Many third-party applications are currently in development through Wii homebrew. One popular Windows program called GlovePIE allows the Wii Remote to be used on a personal computer to emulate a keyboard, mouse or joystick. Connecting the Wii Remote to a personal computer is done via a Bluetooth connection. The Bluetooth program BlueSoleil has been proven to successfully connect a Wii Remote to a PC. Still another program (like GlovePIE) is needed to utilize the Wii Remote's protocol and to use the data it offers.

The Wii Remote Bluetooth protocol can be implemented on other devices including cell phones, which often have poor usability with games. Two students have demonstrated this concept by creating driver software that has the capability to connect the Wii Remote to a Symbian smartphone. The idea behind this driver is that a mobile phone with a TV-out port can replace the game console.

Programmer Johnny Lee posted video demos and sample code at his website related to the use of the Wii Remote for finger tracking, low-cost multipoint interactive whiteboards, and head tracking for desktop VR displays. He demonstrated several such applications at a TED conference. The WiimoteProject forum became the discussion, support and sharing site for Lee's Wii Remote projects and other newer developments.

Studies have been conducted to use the Wii Remote as a practice method to fine-tune surgeons' hand motions. Utilizing DarwiinRemote, researchers at the University of Memphis adapted the Wii Remote for data collection in cognitive psychology experiments. Autodesk released a plugin that allows the Wii Remote to control orientation of 3D models in Autodesk Design Review.

== Reception ==
Overall reception to the Wii Remote has changed over time. The control styles, which are provided by the controller, were met with praise at its first public exhibition at E3. Since then, comments have been noted by the press on its functionality. Matt Wales of IGN UK highlighted the aiming and precision of Red Steel and stated "Taking down swathes of enemies with nothing more than a twitch of the wrist proves immensely satisfying and, more importantly, incredibly involving." Nintendo Power listed the Wii Remote as an innovative controller, citing it as innovative for several firsts, including the first use of motion control, the first built-in speaker, and the first Infrared Pointer. This is incorrect, however; the first video game controller to make use of motion sensitivity was Le Stick for the Atari 2600 and Commodore 64, manufactured by Datasoft Inc., and released in 1981.

Other publications have noted specific complaints regarding control. GameSpot expressed that some motions in Cooking Mama: Cook Off failed to transmit or meet expectation during gameplay. Similar observations were made on other titles made available during the Wii launch period. Computer and Video Games reported that "Most prominent is the first batch of games, many of which do a better job at exposing the obstacles of full motion control, rather than the benefits ... Need For Speed [Carbon] ... is near unplayable, Far Cry got it all wrong, and the motion control in Marvel: Ultimate Alliance just feels tacked on."

The overall situation was described by Joystiq thus: "Over the months since launch, the unpredictable Wii Remote has led to a maddening dichotomy. Some games are too easy, while others are too hard – for all the wrong reasons...Gamers who crave a deeper challenge have to settle for battling incomprehensible controls." Critics felt that fault was largely attributed to the developers' lack of experience with the Wii Remote. Jeremy Parish of the magazine Electronic Gaming Monthly compared the initial phase of control implementation to that of the Nintendo DS. Matt Casamassina of IGN also presumed that the first generation of Wii games were of an experimental stage and that potential for refinement had yet to be exploited.

Later-released titles saw mixed reactions in terms of control. Of Tiger Woods PGA Tour 07 from Electronic Arts, Matthew Kato of Game Informer stated that the controller "has a hard time detecting your backswing. Thus, it's harder to control. There were even times the game putted for me by accident." A GamePro review for Medal of Honor: Vanguard said that the title "is an encouraging sign that developers are finally starting to work out the kinks and quirks of the Wii Remote."

First- and second-party video games produced more favorable utilization of the Wii Remote's unique capabilities. Metroid Prime 3: Corruption, in particular, was nearly universally praised for its unique control scheme, which was seen as being unrivaled by any other console game. Corruption utilizes the Nunchuk for strafing and the infrared pointing capability of the Wii Remote for turning and special "gestures", which are used to select visors. Other Nintendo titles take a more minimalist approach, using mostly the pointer and buttons only, as with Big Brain Academy: Wii Degree, or use the controller in a sideways configuration to resemble a Nintendo Entertainment System controller while the player de-emphasizes more advanced capabilities, as used in Super Paper Mario.

The Wii Remote and Nunchuk combined sold over 8.5 million units in the United States, and took the top two spots in video game accessories sales in 2006. In the United States, the Nunchuk was the best-selling video game hardware for January 2008, with 375,000 units sold, in a month where the Wii was the best-selling console with 274,000 units sold.

According to Nintendo's Shinya Takahashi, player feedback for the Wii Remote, particularly on reducing its form-factor, led into the development of the Nintendo Switch, a console small enough and with smaller controllers to also be used as a portable unit.

== Legal issues ==
The Wii Remote has come under a number of lawsuits from several different companies.

Interlink Electronics filed a patent-infringement lawsuit against Nintendo in December 2006 over the pointing functionality of the Wii Remote, claiming "loss of reasonable royalties, reduced sales and/or lost profits as a result of the infringing activities" of Nintendo. The lawsuit was terminated in March 2007.

On August 19, 2008, Hillcrest Laboratories Inc. filed a complaint against Nintendo with the U.S International Trade Commission, alleging that the Wii Remote infringed on three of its patents. A fourth Hillcrest patent (for graphical interfaces displayed on television screens) was also allegedly violated. Hillcrest sought a ban on Wii consoles imported to the U.S. On August 24, 2009, Nintendo and Hillcrest reached a settlement, although the terms were not publicly disclosed.

In September 2011, ThinkOptics Inc. filed a lawsuit against Nintendo in United States District Court of the Eastern District of Texas over their controller, the Wavit Remote, claiming that the Wii violated its patent for a "handheld vision based absolute pointing system", a "Handheld Device for Handheld Vision Based Absolute Pointing System", and a "Handheld Vision Based Absolute Pointing System", which make up the basis for the Wavit Remote. They also said that the Wii U infringes on their patents as well and claims that Nintendo was aware of the fact that the Wii allegedly violates ThinkOptics' patents. The lawsuit sought an injunction against violating products, royalties, attorney's fees, and damages for lost profits. The lawsuit was dismissed by ThinkOptics in August 2014.

Starting in December 2012, iLife Technologies sued several large companies over patent infringement over a set of patents they held related to "systems and methods for evaluating movement of a body relative to an environment", principally aimed at the medical field; Nintendo was sued by iLife in December 2013 for the Wii Remote's infringement on their patents, with the lawsuit seeking $144 million in damages, based on a $4 fine for the Wii units it had sold to date. A jury trial was heard in August 2017, and the jury ruled in favor of iLife Technologies and Nintendo was forced to pay US$10.1 million in damages. While Nintendo attempted to appeal this ruling, the United States Court of Appeals upheld the jury's decision in December 2017. However, in January 2020, a federal court overturned the judgement and ruled that iLife's patent was too broad.

=== Wrist strap issues ===
The wrist strap of the Wii Remote has also been an issue.

In mid-December 2006, the law firm Green Welling LLP filed a class action lawsuit against Nintendo for its "defective wrist straps". A few days later, Nintendo issued a product recall for the wrist straps and issued a new version of the strap with an improved securing mechanism for the wrist, leading to the lawsuit to be dropped sometime thereafter.

A second class-action lawsuit was filed by a mother in Colorado in December 2008, claiming the updated wrist straps were still ineffective. This suit was dismissed by September 2010, finding for Nintendo that the wrist straps were not knowingly faulty under Colorado consumer protection laws.

=== Trademark issues ===
In 2000, the term "Weemote" was trademarked by Miami based TV remote manufacturer Fobis Technologies and was later used as the name of their remote designed for young children. While spelled differently, the term "Weemote" is phonetically identical to "Wiimote", the unofficial term for the Wii Remote. Sales of the Weemote, which totaled less than one million as of 2008, had fallen due to confusion with the Wiimote. Fobis Technologies claims this to be trademark infringement; however, Nintendo does not actually use the term "Wiimote" in official promotional materials, although many retailers that sell the Wii Remote do use the term. Fobis sent out up to 100 cease and desist letters to retailers and have made offers to Nintendo for them to purchase the trademark. Nintendo declined the offer, stating that it "does not use and does not plan to use the Weemote trademark".

The trademark application for the Wii Remote was initially rejected by the United States Patent and Trademark Office after the trademark was filed in March 2008. The USPTO claimed that the word "remote" is commonly used, and therefore should not be trademarked. The USPTO said they would accept Nintendo's trademark filing if the company disclaims exclusive rights to the word "remote" in the term and if the word "Wii" would always precede the word "remote" in marketing and manuals. The USPTO accepted the "Wii Remote" trademark in July 2012.

== See also ==
- List of Nintendo controllers
- List of Wii games
- Wii Balance Board
- Wii Speak
- PlayStation Move
- Razer Hydra
- Xbox Kinect
