= DarwiinRemote =

Application enabling Wii Remote use on a Mac

- DarwiinRemote being used.
- Developer: Community
- Release: 2006
- Stable release: DarwiinRemote 0.7 / March 28, 2008; 18 years ago
- Written in: Objective-C
- Operating system: Mac OS X
- Available in: English
- Type: Driver
- License: BSD License
- Website: sourceforge.net/projects/darwiin-remote/

DarwiinRemote is an application for Mac OS X v10.4 or above which allows Wii Remote to fully control applications on a Mac. The software includes a desktop application and a developers' framework, allowing for additional functionality. To use the software, the computer must have Bluetooth enabled.

== Usage ==
DarwiinRemote employs most of the features of the Wii Remote. All three accelerometers feed information to the Mac. All of the buttons on the Wii Remote, including the Nunchuk and classic controller attachments, can be used, and the control stick position can be displayed, but it is not possible to use the control stick to control anything. The rumble features and LEDs are fully programmable. In addition, DarwiinRemote can accept the infrared signals from the Wii Sensor Bar. However, to use this feature, the bar must be plugged into a powered socket on a Wii console, or it must be a battery-powered model. One can also, however, use a string of infrared LEDs or a single IR LED from a remote control instead of a sensor bar.

== Button mapping ==
By editing the source code or customizing the application's preferences, the buttons on the remote can emulate any key combination on the Mac. By default, the Remote's buttons correspond with the following keys:

Wii Remote	Key Mapping
A	Left-Click
B	Return (Enter)
Up	Up Key
Down	Down Key
Left	Left Key
Right	Right Key
Plus	Command + Right
Minus	Command + Left
Home	Command + Esc
One	Mouse Mode ON/OFF (Motion Sensor Mode)
Two	Mouse Mode ON/OFF (IR Sensor)

== Reception ==
DarwiinRemote has been used in some academic research on cognition and human–computer interaction.
