= The Penguins of Madagascar: Dr. Blowhole Returns – Again! =

2011 video game

- North American cover art
- Developer: Griptonite Games
- Publisher: THQ
- Artist: Guy Moon
- Composer: W. Gregory Turner
- Series: Madagascar
- Platforms: Nintendo DS, PlayStation 3, Wii, Xbox 360
- Release: NA: September 6, 2011; EU: September 16, 2011
- Genre: Action

The Penguins of Madagascar: Dr. Blowhole Returns – Again! is an adventure video game developed by Griptonite Games and published by THQ available for the Wii, Xbox 360, PlayStation 3, and Nintendo DS. It was released in September 2011.

Based on the popular Nickelodeon cartoon series The Penguins of Madagascar, the game stars the penguin characters Skipper, Kowalski, Rico, and Private. Players go through three "episodes" over 12 levels and participate in secret missions both inside and outside the zoo, with the final level taking place in Dr. Blowhole's lair. The Xbox 360 version requires the Kinect peripheral, and the Wii version requires the uDraw GameTablet accessory.

== Gameplay ==
The penguins must save the world from Dr. Blowhole, the game's villain, and imminent dolphin domination. Dr. Blowhole and his lobster minions have come up with a new plan to take over the world, and it's up to Team Penguin to stop him. The game requires players to solve puzzles, build contraptions, navigate hazards, and rescue others from the zoo including Maurice, Mort, and Marlene. For example, players use Skipper to help assemble the team, while Kowalski builds devices like the Picture Bridge, Trampoline Shirt, Rocket Jet, Drill Barrel & Invulnerable Penguin Suit and Private squeezes through tight spaces. Designed as a single-player game for all ages, players can use the Wii uDraw GameTablet and stylus pen to draw and color characters, as well as to solve strategy games and do other things like walk slide & activate switches to fool their robo villains and Dr. Blowhole himself. All of the original voice cast from the Nickelodeon television series voice their respective characters in the game, including Danny Jacobs as King Julien and Neil Patrick Harris as Dr. Blowhole.

== Reception ==
The game received mixed reception from critics. Common Sense Media gave the Wii version 4/5 stars, stating "the uDraw controls feel layered on, rather than a natural fit for the game. PureBox gave the Xbox 360 version a 6/10 score, saying that “you won't find anything particularly new or exciting from a gameplay perspective and use of Kinect is strictly serviceable.”
