= Disney Princess: Enchanting Storybooks =

2011 video game

- Developer: Page 44 Studios
- Publisher: THQ
- Series: Disney Princess
- Platforms: Nintendo DS, Wii
- Release: NA: November 1, 2011; AU: November 17, 2011; EU: November 18, 2011
- Genre: Art tool
- Mode: Single-player

Disney Princess: Enchanting Storybooks is an art-based video game published by Disney Interactive Studios and developed by THQ that players can play on the uDraw GameTablet for the Wii. The game is based on various princesses from Disney animated films, including Cinderella, Ariel, Belle, Jasmine, Tiana, and Rapunzel. It was released on November 15, 2011 for the Wii and Nintendo DS.

== Gameplay ==
Designed as a single player and multi-player game, players use the uDraw GameTablet and stylus pen in various activities. The game introduces a new character Opal, the Keeper of Color, who is a fairy in charge of coloring the magical kingdoms. The game's plot involves Opal casting a spell and it backfiring, removing all color. Players must help restore color back to the magical kingdoms from Cinderella, The Little Mermaid, Beauty and the Beast, Aladdin, The Princess and the Frog, and Tangled. This is also the first appearance of Rapunzel in a Disney video game.

Players can use the uDraw GameTablet to help complete the coloring books, such as number-painting, tilt-painting, and coloring book pages that narrate the Disney fairy tales. As players progress, they unlock more than 100 coloring books, as well as six tools specific to each Disney Princess, such as Belle's Rose Petal crayon or Rapunzel's watercolor brush.

Other types of gameplay include Magic Search, Make a Melody, Spot the Differences, sticker books, and musical tune-up, all which are themed to the stories and characters from the Disney animated feature films.
