= Dood's Big Adventure =

2010 video game

- North American box art
- Developer: THQ Digital Studios Phoenix
- Publisher: THQ
- Platform: Wii
- Release: NA: November 14, 2010; AU: February 24, 2011; EU: March 4, 2011
- Genre: Action-adventure
- Mode: Single-player

Dood's Big Adventure is an action-adventure and art-based video game developed by THQ Digital Studios Phoenix and published by THQ for the uDraw GameTablet for the Nintendo Wii. The game lets players draw, tilt and maneuver through 60 different challenging levels by creating their own hero and tools within the game. It was released for the Nintendo Wii game system in 2010 in North America and in 2011 for PAL region.

== Gameplay ==
Dood's Big Adventure lets players create a hero and game level using the drawing tools with the uDraw GameTablet. Players can roll, float and bounce through 60 challenges by solving drawing puzzles, collecting coins and defeating various enemies in the game.

Part of the game's fun is in its customization. Players can pick any color for three Dood characters to customize the Dood playing experience. Players can also personalize other elements like the enemies or “baddies,” up to 15 different obstacles, six “Magic Canvases” that you can color in, and nine “Ballonimals” that float in the sky and come to life when customized. Collecting coins earns players star points, which are used to purchase new doodads, Balloonimals, and Magic Canvases.

There are four game modes: Pen Panic, Roly Poly, Bubble Trouble, and Fan Frenzy. Pen Panic uses the uDraw stylus pen to create a trampoline that players can use to bounce Dood through each level. It also lets players use ink to break through walls and flick at their enemies. Roly Poly uses motion control by tilting the uDraw GameTablet left and right to roll Dood through each level. Bubble Trouble uses the stylus to guide Dood through each level while avoiding enemies and dangers like sharp objects. Fan Frenzy inflates Dood like a balloon – players use the stylus to blow and move Dood around.

== Reception ==
Dood's Big Adventure for the uDraw GameTablet has generally received positive reviews. Video game reviewer Joystiq wrote in a review of the new uDraw GameTablet and video games that Dood's Big Adventure is simple but that it does “take advantage of the tablet's intuitive design...While the games are simplistic by design, there's one added level of depth and customization that kids will undoubtedly love.” IGN and its review noted that “there's a huge amount of customization, as you can paint your main character from head to toe, front to back with your own detailed textures, as well as alter the look of the hazards, obstacles and background objects like giant inflatable animal balloons.”

== See also ==
- Wii
- THQ
