= List of THQ games =

This is a list of video games that were published or distributed by THQ.

== Published titles ==
Title	Platform(s)	Release date	Developer(s)	Ref.
Fox's Peter Pan & The Pirates: The Revenge of Captain Hook	Nintendo Entertainment System	January 1991	Equilibrium	
Bo Jackson: Two Games in One	Game Boy	June 1991	Equilibrium	
Where's Waldo?	Nintendo Entertainment System	September 1991	Bethesda Softworks	
Home Alone	Game Boy	November 1991	Imagineering	
Home Alone	Super Nintendo Entertainment System	December 1991	Imagineering	
Attack of the Killer Tomatoes	Nintendo Entertainment System	1991	Imagineering	
Home Alone	Nintendo Entertainment System	1991	Bethesda Softworks	
Pit-Fighter	Super Nintendo Entertainment System	1991	Eastridge Technology	
The Flash	Game Boy	1991	Equilibrium	
Wayne Gretzky Hockey	Nintendo Entertainment System	1991	Bethesda Softworks	
Attack of the Killer Tomatoes	Game Boy	January 1992	Equilibrium	
Pit-Fighter	Game Boy	June 1992	Eastridge Technology	
Race Drivin'	Super Nintendo Entertainment System	October 1992	Imagineering	
Road Riot 4WD	Super Nintendo Entertainment System	November 1992	Equilibrium	
Swamp Thing	Nintendo Entertainment System	December 1992	Imagineering	
The Adventures of Rocky and Bullwinkle and Friends	Nintendo Entertainment System	December 1992	Radical Entertainment	
The Great Waldo Search	Super Nintendo Entertainment System	December 1992	Radiance Software	
Home Alone 2: Lost in New York	Game Boy	1992	Imagineering	
Home Alone 2: Lost in New York	Nintendo Entertainment System	1992	Imagineering	
Home Alone 2: Lost in New York	Super Nintendo Entertainment System	1992	Imagineering	
James Bond Jr	Nintendo Entertainment System	1992	Eurocom Developments	
James Bond Jr	Super Nintendo Entertainment System	1992	Gray Matter	
Swamp Thing	Game Boy	1992	Equilibrium	
The Adventures of Rocky and Bullwinkle and Friends	Game Boy	1992	Equilibrium	
The Great Waldo Search	Sega Genesis	1992	Radiance Software	
The Ren & Stimpy Show: Space Cadet Adventures	Game Boy	1992	Imagineering	
Race Drivin'	Game Boy	January 1993	Argonaut Games	
Wayne's World	Super Nintendo Entertainment System	April 1993	Radical Entertainment	
The Adventures of Rocky and Bullwinkle and Friends	Super Nintendo Entertainment System	June 1993	Absolute Entertainment	
The Great Waldo Search	Super Nintendo Entertainment System	June 1993	Radiance Software	
Thomas the Tank Engine & Friends	Super Nintendo Entertainment System	September 30, 1993	Software Creations	
The Ren & Stimpy Show: Veediots!	Super Nintendo Entertainment System	October 1993	Gray Matter	
The Ren & Stimpy Show: Buckeroo$!	Nintendo Entertainment System	November 1993	Imagineering	
Wayne's World	Game Boy	November 1993	Radical Entertainment	
Wayne's World	Nintendo Entertainment System	November 1993	Radical Entertainment	
The Lawnmower Man	Super Nintendo Entertainment System	1993	The Sales Curve	
The Ren & Stimpy Show: Veediots!	Game Boy	1993	Eastridge Technology	
Thomas the Tank Engine & Friends	Sega Genesis	1993	Malibu Interactive	
Wayne's World	Sega Genesis	1993	Gray Matter	
The Ren & Stimpy Show: Fire Dogs	Super Nintendo Entertainment System	June 1994	Argonaut Games	
Disney's The Jungle Book	Game Boy	August 1994	Eurocom Developments	
The Ren & Stimpy Show: Time Warp	Super Nintendo Entertainment System	November 1994	Sculptured Software	
The Ren & Stimpy Show: Buckeroo$!	Super Nintendo Entertainment System	April 1995	Absolute Entertainment	
Mohawk & Headphone Jack	Super Nintendo Entertainment System	1995	Black Pearl Software	
Pinocchio	Sega Genesis	1995	Virgin Studios London	
The Mask	Super Nintendo Entertainment System	1995	Black Pearl Software	
Urban Strike	Game Gear	1995	Borta	
Taz Mania 2	Game Boy	January 1997	Beam Software	
Disney's The Hunchback of Notre Dame	Game Boy	March 1997	Tiertex Design Studios	
D.O.G: Fight For Your Life	Microsoft Windows	July 24, 1997	Greenwood Entertainment Software	
Disney's Hercules	Game Boy	July 1997	Tiertex Design Studios	
Brunswick World: Tournament of Champions	Super Nintendo Entertainment System	August 1997	Tiertex Design Studios	
WCW vs. the World	PlayStation	October 7, 1997	AKI Corporation	
Bravo Air Race	PlayStation	October 1997	Metro Corporation	
Pax Imperia: Eminent Domain	Microsoft Windows	October 1997	Heliotrope Studios	
WCW vs. NWO: World Tour	Nintendo 64	November 16, 1997	AKI Corporation	
NBA Live 98	Sega Saturn	November 1997	Tiertex Design Studios	
Ghost in the Shell	PlayStation	December 3, 1997	Exact	
The Lost World: Jurassic Park	Game Boy	December 1997	Torus Games	
Disney's Aladdin	Game Boy	1997	NMS Software	
International Rally Championship	Microsoft Windows	1997	Magnetic Fields	
K-1 The Arena Fighters	PlayStation	1997	Daft Co.	
Circle of Blood	PlayStation	January 31, 1998	Digital Amusements	
WCW Nitro	PlayStation	January 1998	Inland Productions	
Quest 64	Nintendo 64	June 1, 1998	Imagineering	
The Granstream Saga	PlayStation	June 1, 1998	Shade	
Hot Wheels Stunt Track Driver	Microsoft Windows	July 15, 1998	Semi Logic Entertainments	
Devil Dice	PlayStation	September 11, 1998	Shift	
G Darius	PlayStation	September 11, 1998	Aisystem Tokyo	
Brunswick Circuit Pro Bowling	Nintendo 64	September 30, 1998	Point of View	
Rugrats: Search for Reptar	PlayStation	October 31, 1998	N-Space	
Disney's Mulan	Game Boy	October 1998	Tiertex Design Studios	
WCW/NWO Revenge	Nintendo 64	November 17, 1998	AKI Corporation	
Brunswick Circuit Pro Bowling	PlayStation	November 1998	Adrenaline Software	
Small Soldiers	Game Boy	November 1998	Tiertex Design Studios	
Bass Masters Classic: Tournament Edition	Microsoft Windows	1998	Inland Productions	
Extreme 500	Microsoft Windows	1998	Ascaron	
Pax Imperia: Eminent Domain	Mac OS	1998	Heliotrope Studios	
Redjack: Revenge of the Brethren	Mac OS	1998	CyberFlix	
Redjack: Revenge of the Brethren	Microsoft Windows	1998	CyberFlix	
The Rugrats Movie	Game Boy	1998	Software Creations	
WCW Nitro	Microsoft Windows	1998	Inland Productions	
WCW/NWO Thunder	PlayStation	January 12, 1999	Inland Productions	
WCW Nitro	Nintendo 64	February 10, 1999	Inland Productions	
A Bug's Life	Game Boy Color	May 30, 1999	Tiertex Design Studios	
Rugrats: Scavenger Hunt	Nintendo 64	June 29, 1999	Realtime Associates	
Sinistar: Unleashed	Microsoft Windows	September 15, 1999	GameFX Technology	
Destruction Derby 64	Nintendo 64	October 2, 1999	Looking Glass Studios	
Bass Masters Classic	Game Boy Color	November 4, 1999	Natsume Co., Ltd.	
Madden NFL 2000	Game Boy Color	November 5, 1999	Tiertex Design Studios	
Toy Story 2	Game Boy Color	November 14, 1999	Tiertex Design Studios	
WWF WrestleMania 2000	Game Boy Color	November 15, 1999	Natsume Co., Ltd.	
WWF WrestleMania 2000	Nintendo 64	November 17, 1999	AKI Corporation	
Road Rash 64	Nintendo 64	November 1999	Pacific Coast Power and Light	
Bass Masters 2000	Nintendo 64	December 16, 1999	Mass Media Games	
FIFA 2000	Game Boy Color	December 20, 1999	Tiertex Design Studios	
Nuclear Strike	Nintendo 64	December 1999	Pacific Coast Power and Light	
Star Wars: Yoda Stories	Game Boy Color	December 1999	Torus Games	
Championship Motocross	PlayStation	1999	Funcom Dublin	
Dark Secrets of Africa	Microsoft Windows	1999	New Generation Software	
Mia Hamm Soccer 64	Nintendo 64	1999	DC Studios	
MTV Sports: Snowboarding	PlayStation	1999	Radical Entertainment	
N.I.C.E. 2: Tune-Up	Microsoft Windows	1999	Synetic	
Penny Racers	Nintendo 64	1999	Locomotive	
Rent-a-Hero	Microsoft Windows	1999	Neo Software Produktions	
Rugrats: Studio Tour	PlayStation	1999	N-Space	
Rugrats: Time Travelers	Game Boy Color	1999	Software Creations	
Shaolin	PlayStation	1999	Polygon Magic	
The Rugrats Movie	Game Boy Color	1999	Software Creations	
Ultimate 8 Ball	PlayStation	1999	Mirage Technologies	
WWF Royal Rumble	Dreamcast	January 10, 2000	Yuke's	
Blaze & Blade: Eternal Quest	Microsoft Windows	January 2000	Elo Interactive Media	
Brunswick Circuit Pro Bowling 2	PlayStation	February 10, 2000	Adrenalin Interactive, Sennari Games	
Aidyn Chronicles: The First Mage	Nintendo 64	March 1, 2000	H2O Entertainment	
WWF Smackdown!	PlayStation	March 2, 2000	Yuke's	
Extreme 500	PlayStation	March 2000	Ascaron	
Rugrats: Totally Angelica	Game Boy Color	May 2000	Tiertex Design Studios	
Triple Play 2001	Game Boy Color	May 8, 2000	Handheld Games	
Croc	Game Boy Color	June 6, 2000	Argonaut Games, Virtucraft	
BreakNeck	Microsoft Windows	June 27, 2000	Synetic	
X-Tension	Microsoft Windows	June 2000	Egosoft	
Cultures	Microsoft Windows	July 25, 2000	Funatics Software, Joymania Development	
NASCAR 2000	Game Boy Color	August 30, 2000	Software Creations	
MTV Sports: Skateboarding	PlayStation	September 12, 2000	Darkblack	
Disney's The Little Mermaid II	PlayStation	September 25, 2000	Blitz Games	
Saban's Power Rangers: Lightspeed Rescue	Nintendo 64	September 28, 2000	Mass Media Games	
Buffy the Vampire Slayer	Game Boy Color	September 30, 2000	GameBrains	
Saban's Power Rangers: Lightspeed Rescue	PlayStation	September 2000	Climax Studios	
MTV Sports: Skateboarding	Dreamcast	October 19, 2000	Darkblack	
Summoner	PlayStation 2	October 26, 2000	Volition	
Chicken Run	Game Boy Color	November 3, 2000	Blitz Games, Gameworld Seven	
WWF No Mercy	Nintendo 64	November 17, 2000	AKI Corporation	
Rugrats in Paris: The Movie	Game Boy Color	November 20, 2000	Software Creations	
WWF Smackdown! 2: Know Your Role	PlayStation	November 20, 2000	Yuke's	
Scooby-Doo!: Classic Creep Capers	Nintendo 64	November 29, 2000	TerraGlyph Interactive Studios, Fallen Development	
Micro Machines V3	Game Boy Color	November 2000	Novalicious	
Rugrats in Paris: The Movie	Nintendo 64	November 2000	Avalanche Software	
Rugrats in Paris: The Movie	PlayStation	November 2000	Avalanche Software	
Evil Dead: Hail to the King	PlayStation	December 5, 2000	Heavy Iron Studios	
Star Wars: Episode I - Obi-Wan's Adventures	Game Boy Color	December 12, 2000	HotGen	
Evil Dead: Hail to the King	Dreamcast	December 18, 2000	Heavy Iron Studios	
MTV Sports: Pure Ride	Game Boy Color	December 2000	Visual Impact	
MTV Sports: T.J. Lavin's Ultimate BMX	Game Boy Color	December 2000	Handheld Games	
Danger Girl	PlayStation	2000	N-Space	
MTV Sports: Pure Ride	PlayStation	2000	Radical Entertainment	
MTV Sports: Skateboarding	Game Boy Color	2000	Darkblack	
MTV Sports: Skateboarding	Microsoft Windows	2000	Darkblack	
Tiger Woods PGA Tour 2000	Game Boy Color	2000	Xantera	
Saban's Power Rangers: Lightspeed Rescue	Game Boy Color	2000	Natsume Co., Ltd.	
X: Beyond the Frontier	Microsoft Windows	2000	Egosoft	
Croc 2	Game Boy Color	January 26, 2001	Natsume Co., Ltd.	
Championship Motocross 2001	PlayStation	January 31, 2001	Funcom Dublin	
Mercedes-Benz Truck Racing	Microsoft Windows	February 3, 2001	Synetic	
Scooby-Doo!: Classic Creep Capers	Game Boy Color	February 20, 2001	Digital Eclipse	
SpongeBob SquarePants: Legend of the Lost Spatula	Game Boy Color	March 5, 2001	Vicarious Visions	
MTV Sports: T.J. Lavin's Ultimate BMX	PlayStation	March 21, 2001	Blue Shift	
Summoner	Microsoft Windows	March 27, 2001	Volition	
The Simpsons: Night of the Living Treehouse of Horror	Game Boy Color	March 28, 2001	Software Creations	
Indiana Jones and the Infernal Machine	Game Boy Color	March 30, 2001	HotGen Studios, LucasArts	
Evil Dead: Hail to the King	Microsoft Windows	April 1, 2001	Heavy Iron Studios	
Rugrats: Totally Angelica	PlayStation	April 10, 2001	ART Co.	
Conker's Bad Fur Day	Nintendo 64	April 13, 2001	Rare	
Red Faction	PlayStation 2	May 22, 2001	Volition	
The F.A. Premier League Stars 2001	Game Boy Color	June 8, 2001	Krisalis Software	
Earthworm Jim	Game Boy Advance	June 11, 2001	Game Titan	
GT Advance Championship Racing	Game Boy Advance	June 11, 2001	MTO Co.	
MX 2002 featuring Ricky Carmichael	PlayStation 2	July 2, 2001	Pacific Coast Power and Light	
Disney's Atlantis: The Lost Empire	Game Boy Color	July 30, 2001	Eurocom	
WWF Betrayal	Game Boy Color	August 7, 2001	WayForward	
Disney's Atlantis: The Lost Empire	Game Boy Advance	September 1, 2001	3d6 Games	
Rocket Power: Team Rocket Rescue	PlayStation	September 4, 2001	Darkblack	
MX 2002 featuring Ricky Carmichael	Game Boy Advance	September 16, 2001	Tiertex Design Studios	
Red Faction	Microsoft Windows	September 18, 2001	Volition	
SpongeBob SquarePants: Operation Krabby Patty	Microsoft Windows	September 20, 2001	AWE Productions	
Player Manager 2001	Game Boy Color	September 21, 2001	G3 Interactive	
Tetris Worlds	Game Boy Advance	September 24, 2001	3d6 Games	
Rugrats: Castle Capers	Game Boy Advance	September 25, 2001	Software Creations	
Hot Wheels: Mechanix	Microsoft Windows	September 27, 2001	AWE Productions	
Hot Wheels: Extreme Racing	PlayStation	September 2001	HotGen Studios, Atod	
BASS Strike	PlayStation 2	October 4, 2001	Pai	
Monsters, Inc.	Game Boy Advance	October 24, 2001	Natsume Co., Ltd.	
Monsters, Inc.	Game Boy Color	October 2001	Vicarious Visions	
Rugrats: All Growed Up	Microsoft Windows	October 2001	Sapient Interactive	
Scooby-Doo and the Cyber Chase	PlayStation	October 2001	ART Co.	
Micro Maniacs	Game Boy Color	November 2, 2001	Hyperion Studios	
Jimmy Neutron: Boy Genius	Microsoft Windows	November 6, 2001	AWE Productions	
Sky Sports Football Manager	Microsoft Windows	November 9, 2001	HotGen Studios	
Dark Summit	Xbox	November 15, 2001	Radical Entertainment	
Dark Summit	PlayStation 2	November 16, 2001	Radical Entertainment	
WWF Smackdown! Just Bring It	PlayStation 2	November 19, 2001	Yuke's	
Hot Wheels: Burnin' Rubber	Game Boy Advance	November 20, 2001	Altron	
Sky Sports Football Quiz	Microsoft Windows	November 23, 2001	Hothouse Creations	
Saban's Power Rangers: Time Force	PlayStation	November 2001	Climax Studios	
MX 2002 featuring Ricky Carmichael	Xbox	December 4, 2001	Pacific Coast Power and Light	
Sky Sports Football Quiz	PlayStation	December 7, 2001	Hothouse Creations	
Action Man: Search for Base X	Game Boy Color	2001	Natsume Co., Ltd.	
Aliens: Thanatos Encounter	Game Boy Color	2001	Crawfish Interactive	
Blue's Clues: Blue's Big Musical	PlayStation	2001	TerraGlyph Interactive Studios	
Bob the Builder: Can We Fix It?	Microsoft Windows	2001	Steel Monkeys	
Bob the Builder: Can We Fix It?	PlayStation	2001	Steel Monkeys	
Bob the Builder: Fix it Fun!	Game Boy Color	2001	Tiertex Design Studios	
Hot Wheels: Jetz	Microsoft Windows	2001	Eagle Interactive	
Saban's Power Rangers: Time Force	Game Boy Advance	2001	Vicarious Visions	
Saban's Power Rangers: Time Force	Game Boy Color	2001	Natsume Co., Ltd.	
Saban's Power Rangers: Time Force	Microsoft Windows	2001	KnowWonder	
Scooby-Doo and the Cyber Chase	Game Boy Advance	2001	Software Creations	
SpongeBob SquarePants: SuperSponge	Game Boy Advance	2001	Climax Studios	
SpongeBob SquarePants: SuperSponge	PlayStation	2001	Climax Studios	
Star Wars: Jedi Power Battles	Game Boy Advance	2001	HotGen Studios	
Tetris Worlds	Microsoft Windows	2001	Blue Planet Software	
Who Wants to Be a Millionaire: 2nd Edition	Game Boy Color	2001	Eurocom	
Astrosmash (Note: Published by THQ Wireless)	J2ME	January 2002	Lavastorm Engineering	
Sonic Advance	Game Boy Advance	February 4, 2002	Sonic Team, Dimps	
Columns Crown	Game Boy Advance	February 5, 2002	Wow Entertainment	
Dark Summit	GameCube	February 5, 2002	Radical Entertainment	
WWF Raw	Xbox	February 12, 2002	Anchor, Inc.	
New Legends	Xbox	February 17, 2002	Infinite Machine	
Puyo Pop	Game Boy Advance	February 2002	Sonic Team, Caret House	
Hot Wheels: Williams F1 - Team Racer	Microsoft Windows	March 15, 2002	KnowWonder	
Tetris Worlds	PlayStation 2	March 21, 2002	Blue Planet Software	
Britney's Dance Beat	Game Boy Advance	March 28, 2002	ART Co.	
Britney's Dance Beat	PlayStation 2	May 10, 2002	Metro Corporation	
Baseball Advance	Game Boy Advance	May 19, 2002	Smilebit	
Scooby-Doo!: Night of 100 Frights	PlayStation 2	May 21, 2002	Heavy Iron Studios	
Spirit: Stallion of the Cimarron	Game Boy Advance	May 28, 2002	Hyperspace Cowgirls	
Star Wars: Episode II - Attack of the Clones	Game Boy Advance	May 30, 2002	David A. Palmer Productions	
Spirit: Stallion of the Cimarron - Forever Free	Microsoft Windows	May 31, 2002	The Fizz Factor	
MotoGP: Ultimate Racing Technology	Xbox	May 2002	Climax Studios	
Scooby Doo	Game Boy Advance	June 6, 2002	Helixe	
Sky Sports Football Quiz Season 02	PlayStation	June 7, 2002	Hothouse Creations	
WWE WrestleMania X8	GameCube	June 10, 2002	Yuke's	
GT Advance 2: Rally Racing	Game Boy Advance	June 18, 2002	MTO	
The Pinball of the Dead	Game Boy Advance	June 18, 2002	Eighting	
MX Superfly	PlayStation 2	June 19, 2002	Pacific Coast Power & Light	
Britney's Dance Beat	Microsoft Windows	June 21, 2002	Hyperspace Cowgirls	
MX Superfly	GameCube	June 25, 2002	Pacific Coast Power & Light	
Tetris Worlds	Xbox	June 25, 2002	Blue Planet Software	
Tetris Worlds	GameCube	June 26, 2002	Radical Entertainment	
MotoGP: Ultimate Racing Technology	Microsoft Windows	July 2002	Climax Studios	
Bob the Builder: Bob Builds a Park	Microsoft Windows	August 9, 2002	Asylum Entertainment	
The Adventures of Jimmy Neutron: Boy Genius Vs. Jimmy Negatron	Microsoft Windows	September 9, 2002	AWE Games	
Scooby-Doo!: Night of 100 Frights	GameCube	September 12, 2002	Heavy Iron Studios	
SpongeBob SquarePants: Employee of the Month	Microsoft Windows	September 20, 2002	AWE Productions	
Rugrats Munchin Land	Microsoft Windows	September 23, 2002	KnowWonder	
Summoner 2	PlayStation 2	September 23, 2002	Volition	
Virtua Tennis	Game Boy Advance	September 25, 2002	Altron	
The Adventures of Jimmy Neutron: Boy Genius Vs. Jimmy Negatron	Game Boy Advance	September 26, 2002	Human Soft	
Jimmy Neutron: Boy Genius	PlayStation 2	September 2002	BigSky Interactive	
Monsters, Inc.: Scream Arena	GameCube	September 2002	Radical Entertainment	
Rocket Power: Beach Bandits	PlayStation 2	September 2002	Evolution Games	
WWE Road to Wrestlemania X8	Game Boy Advance	October 8, 2002	Natsume Co., Ltd.	
WWF Raw	Microsoft Windows	October 13, 2002	MicroVision	
Red Faction II	PlayStation 2	October 16, 2002	Volition	
Toxic Grind	Xbox	October 21, 2002	Blue Shift, Exile Interactive	
Hot Wheels: Velocity X	Microsoft Windows	October 22, 2002	Beyond Games	
The Fairly OddParents!: Enter the Cleft	Game Boy Advance	November 4, 2002	Altron	
Star Wars: The New Droid Army	Game Boy Advance	November 8, 2002	Helixe	
Hot Wheels: Velocity X	Game Boy Advance	November 12, 2002	Saffire	
Hot Wheels: Velocity X	GameCube	November 12, 2002	Beyond Games	
Hot Wheels: Velocity X	PlayStation 2	November 12, 2002	Beyond Games	
The Revenge of Shinobi	Game Boy Advance	November 13, 2002	3d6 Games	
WWE Smackdown! Shut Your Mouth	PlayStation 2	November 13, 2002	Yuke's	
Rugrats: I Gotta Go Party	Game Boy Advance	November 18, 2002	Eurocom	
MX Superfly	Xbox	November 20, 2002	Pacific Coast Power & Light	
SpongeBob SquarePants: Revenge of the Flying Dutchman	PlayStation 2	November 21, 2002	BigSky Interactive	
Altered Beast: Guardian of the Realms	Game Boy Advance	November 25, 2002	3d6 Games	
Rugrats: Royal Ransom	GameCube	November 27, 2002	Avalanche Software	
Rugrats: Royal Ransom	PlayStation 2	November 2002	Avalanche Software	
SpongeBob SquarePants: Revenge of the Flying Dutchman	GameCube	December 17, 2002	BigSky Interactive	
Block and Score Soccer	J2ME	2002	Cybiko	
Hey Arnold! The Movie	Game Boy Advance	2002	Altron	
Jimmy Neutron: Boy Genius	GameCube	2002	BigSky Interactive, Kalisto Entertainment	
Major League Baseball	J2ME	2002	Centerscore	
Matchbox: Cross Town Heroes	Mac OS	2002	ImaginEngine	
Matchbox: Cross Town Heroes	Microsoft Windows	2002	ImaginEngine	
NASL Soccer	J2ME	2002	Centerscore	
Oil Rig	J2ME	2002	Kiloo	
Rocket Power: Beach Bandits	GameCube	2002	Evolution Games	
Shark! Shark!	J2ME	2002	Flarb	
The Wild Thornberrys Movie	Microsoft Windows	2002	Human Soft	
The Wild Thornberrys: Rambler	Microsoft Windows	2002	Human Code	
PRIDE FC: Fighting Championships	PlayStation 2	January 11, 2003	Anchor, Inc.	
GT Advance 3: Pro Concept Racing	Game Boy Advance	February 4, 2003	MTO Co.	
Summoner 2	GameCube	February 4, 2003	Cranky Pants Games	
Sonic Advance 2	Game Boy Advance	March 10, 2003	Sonic Team, Dimps	
Big Mutha Truckers	Microsoft Windows	March 16, 2003	Eutechnyx	
WWE Crush Hour	GameCube	March 19, 2003	Pacific Coast Power and Light	
WWE Crush Hour	PlayStation 2	March 19, 2003	Pacific Coast Power and Light	
Red Faction II	Xbox	March 30, 2003	Volition	
Red Faction II	GameCube	April 1, 2003	Cranky Pants Games	
Crazy Taxi: Catch a Ride	Game Boy Advance	April 8, 2003	Graphic State	
Red Faction II	Microsoft Windows	April 9, 2003	Outrage Games	
MotoGP	J2ME	May 1, 2003	Cybiko	
Yager	Xbox	May 3, 2003	Yager Development	
Rugrats Go Wild	Microsoft Windows	May 5, 2003	ImaginEngine	
Finding Nemo	PlayStation 2	May 9, 2003	Traveller's Tales	
Finding Nemo	Game Boy Advance	May 10, 2003	Vicarious Visions	
Finding Nemo	Xbox	May 10, 2003	Traveller's Tales	
Finding Nemo	GameCube	May 12, 2003	Traveller's Tales	
Evil Dead: A Fistful of Boomstick	PlayStation 2	May 20, 2003	VIS Entertainment	
MotoGP 2	Microsoft Windows	May 21, 2003	Climax Studios	
MotoGP 2	Xbox	May 21, 2003	Climax Studios	
Finding Nemo	Mac OS	May 2003	KnowWonder	
Finding Nemo	Microsoft Windows	May 2003	KnowWonder	
Rugrats Go Wild	Game Boy Advance	May 2003	ImaginEngine	
Buffy the Vampire Slayer: Wrath of the Darkhul King	Game Boy Advance	June 11, 2003	Natsume Co., Ltd.	
Big Mutha Truckers	PlayStation 2	June 16, 2003	Eutechnyx	
Evil Dead: A Fistful of Boomstick	Xbox	June 17, 2003	VIS Entertainment	
Space Channel 5: Ulala's Cosmic Attack	Game Boy Advance	June 17, 2003	ART Co.	
Big Mutha Truckers	Xbox	June 23, 2003	Eutechnyx	
Jet Grind Radio	Game Boy Advance	June 24, 2003	Vicarious Visions	
The Simpsons: Road Rage	Game Boy Advance	June 30, 2003	Altron	
Splashdown: Rides Gone Wild	PlayStation 2	August 5, 2003	Rainbow Studios	
Monster Truck Madness	Game Boy Advance	August 11, 2003	Tantalus Interactive	
Big Mutha Truckers	GameCube	August 14, 2003	Eutechnyx	
Alter Echo	PlayStation 2	August 18, 2003	Outrage Games	
Alter Echo	Xbox	August 19, 2003	Outrage Games	
Scooby-Doo!: Night of 100 Frights	Xbox	August 27, 2003	Heavy Iron Studios	
Bob the Builder: Bob's Castle Adventure	Microsoft Windows	September 2003	Absolute Studios	
WWE WrestleMania XIX	GameCube	September 8, 2003	Yuke's	
Bionicle	Game Boy Advance	September 11, 2003	Möbius Entertainment	
Banjo-Kazooie: Grunty's Revenge	Game Boy Advance	September 12, 2003	Rare	
WWE Raw 2	Xbox	September 15, 2003	Anchor, Inc.	
The Adventures of Jimmy Neutron: Boy Genius - Jet Fusion	GameCube	September 16, 2003	Krome Studios	
The Adventures of Jimmy Neutron: Boy Genius - Jet Fusion	PlayStation 2	September 18, 2003	Krome Studios	
Oddworld: Munch's Oddysee	Game Boy Advance	September 23, 2003	ART Co.	
Yager	Microsoft Windows	September 24, 2003	Yager Development	
Piglet's Big Game	Game Boy Advance	September 26, 2003	Doki Denki	
Warhammer 40,000: Fire Warrior	Microsoft Windows	September 26, 2003	Kuju	
Disney's The Lion King 1 ½	Game Boy Advance	October 5, 2003	Vicarious Visions	
SpongeBob SquarePants: Battle for Bikini Bottom	Microsoft Windows	October 7, 2003	AWE Games	
Tak and the Power of Juju	GameCube	October 15, 2003	Avalanche Software	
Tak and the Power of Juju	PlayStation 2	October 15, 2003	Avalanche Software	
WWE Smackdown! Here Comes the Pain	PlayStation 2	October 27, 2003	Yuke's	
Hot Wheels: World Race	GameCube	October 2003	Climax Studios	
Hot Wheels: World Race	PlayStation 2	October 2003	Climax Studios	
Tak and the Power of Juju	Game Boy Advance	October 2003	Helixe	
SpongeBob SquarePants: Battle for Bikini Bottom	GameCube	November 3, 2003	Heavy Iron Studios	
SpongeBob SquarePants: Battle for Bikini Bottom	PlayStation 2	November 3, 2003	Heavy Iron Studios	
SpongeBob SquarePants: Battle for Bikini Bottom	Xbox	November 3, 2003	Heavy Iron Studios	
The Fairly OddParents!: Breakin' da Rules	Game Boy Advance	November 5, 2003	Helixe	
Sphinx and the Cursed Mummy	GameCube	November 10, 2003	Eurocom	
Sphinx and the Cursed Mummy	PlayStation 2	November 10, 2003	Eurocom	
Sphinx and the Cursed Mummy	Xbox	November 10, 2003	Eurocom	
Broken Sword: The Sleeping Dragon	Microsoft Windows	November 14, 2003	Revolution Software, Six by Nine, Sumo Digital	
Broken Sword: The Sleeping Dragon	PlayStation 2	November 14, 2003	Revolution Software, Six by Nine, Sumo Digital	
Broken Sword: The Sleeping Dragon	Xbox	November 14, 2003	Revolution Software, Six by Nine, Sumo Digital	
Warhammer 40,000: Fire Warrior	PlayStation 2	November 17, 2003	Kuju	
Star Wars: Flight of the Falcon	Game Boy Advance	November 18, 2003	Pocket Studios	
Hot Wheels: World Race	Microsoft Windows	November 28, 2003	Climax Studios	
The Fairly OddParents!: Breakin' da Rules	GameCube	November 2003	Blitz Games	
The Fairly OddParents!: Breakin' da Rules	PlayStation 2	November 2003	Blitz Games	
The Fairly OddParents!: Breakin' da Rules	Xbox	November 2003	Blitz Games	
Nicktoons Raceway	Game Boy Advence	December 9, 2003	Data Design Interactive	
Red Faction	N-Gage	December 10, 2003	Monkeystone Games	
Congo Cube	J2ME	2003	Monkeystone Games	
Dig It!	BREW	2003	Monkeystone Games	
Finding Nemo: Nemo's Underwater World of Fun	Mac OS	2003	KnowWonder	
Finding Nemo: Nemo's Underwater World of Fun	Microsoft Windows	2003	KnowWonder	
Jewels and Jim	BREW	2003	Monkeystone Games	
MLB Slam!	N-Gage	2003	Hexacto Games	
Rover Reunion	J2ME	2003	Cybiko	
Worms	J2ME	January 1, 2004	Kiloo	
Sonic Battle	Game Boy Advance	January 5, 2004	Sonic Team	
MX Unleashed	PlayStation 2	February 17, 2004	Rainbow Studios	
MX Unleashed	Xbox	February 17, 2004	Rainbow Studios	
Scooby-Doo!: Mystery Mayhem	GameCube	March 2, 2004	Artificial Mind & Movement	
Scooby-Doo!: Mystery Mayhem	PlayStation 2	March 2, 2004	Artificial Mind & Movement	
Scooby-Doo!: Mystery Mayhem	Xbox	March 2, 2004	Artificial Mind & Movement	
Scooby-Doo 2: Monsters Unleashed	Game Boy Advance	March 2004	Altron	
Scooby-Doo 2: Monsters Unleashed	Microsoft Windows	March 2004	AWE Games	
Sonic Advance 3	Game Boy Advance	June 7, 2004	Sonic Team, Dimps	
Sabre Wulf	Game Boy Advance	June 9, 2004	Rare	
WWE Day of Reckoning	GameCube	August 31, 2004	Yuke's	
The Fairly OddParents!: Shadow Showdown	GameCube	September 9, 2004	Blitz Games	
The Adventures of Jimmy Neutron: Boy Genius - Attack of the Twonkies	Game Boy Advance	September 13, 2004	Tantalus Interactive, THQ Studio Australia	
The Adventures of Jimmy Neutron: Boy Genius - Attack of the Twonkies	GameCube	September 13, 2004	THQ Studio Australia	
The Adventures of Jimmy Neutron: Boy Genius - Attack of the Twonkies	PlayStation 2	September 13, 2004	THQ Studio Australia	
Warhammer 40,000: Dawn of War	Microsoft Windows	September 20, 2004	Relic Entertainment	
Full Spectrum Warrior	Microsoft Windows	September 21, 2004	Pandemic Studios	
Nicktoons: Freeze Frame Frenzy	Game Boy Advance	September 27, 2004	Altron	
The Fairly OddParents!: Shadow Showdown	Microsoft Windows	September 2004	ImaginEngine	
LEGO Knights' Kingdom	Game Boy Advance	October 4, 2004	Razorback Developments	
Tak 2: The Staff of Dreams	Game Boy Advance	October 11, 2004	Helixe	
Tak 2: The Staff of Dreams	GameCube	October 11, 2004	Avalanche Software	
Tak 2: The Staff of Dreams	PlayStation 2	October 11, 2004	Avalanche Software	
Tak 2: The Staff of Dreams	Xbox	October 11, 2004	Avalanche Software	
WWE Survivor Series	Game Boy Advance	October 12, 2004	Natsume Co., Ltd.	
Nicktoons Movin'	PlayStation 2	October 21, 2004	Mass Media Games	
The Incredibles	Mac OS	October 26, 2004	Beenox	
The Incredibles	Microsoft Windows	October 26, 2004	Beenox	
The SpongeBob SquarePants Movie	GameCube	October 27, 2004	Heavy Iron Studios	
The SpongeBob SquarePants Movie	Microsoft Windows	October 27, 2004	AWE Games	
The SpongeBob SquarePants Movie	PlayStation 2	October 27, 2004	Heavy Iron Studios	
The SpongeBob SquarePants Movie	Xbox	October 27, 2004	Heavy Iron Studios	
The Incredibles	Game Boy Advance	November 1, 2004	Helixe	
The Incredibles	GameCube	November 1, 2004	Heavy Iron Studios	
The Incredibles	PlayStation 2	November 1, 2004	Heavy Iron Studios	
The Incredibles	Xbox	November 1, 2004	Heavy Iron Studios	
The Polar Express	GameCube	November 1, 2004	Blue Tongue Entertainment	
The Polar Express	Microsoft Windows	November 1, 2004	Blue Tongue Entertainment	
The Polar Express	PlayStation 2	November 1, 2004	Blue Tongue Entertainment	
WWE Smackdown vs. Raw	PlayStation 2	November 2, 2004	Yuke's	
Finding Nemo: The Continuing Adventures	Game Boy Advance	November 12, 2004	Altron	
Hot Wheels: Stunt Track Challenge	Microsoft Windows	November 16, 2004	Climax Studios	
Hot Wheels: Stunt Track Challenge	PlayStation 2	November 16, 2004	Climax Studios	
Hot Wheels: Stunt Track Challenge	Xbox	November 16, 2004	Climax Studios	
The Incredibles: When Danger Calls	Mac OS	November 26, 2004	ImaginEngine	
The Incredibles: When Danger Calls	Microsoft Windows	November 26, 2004	ImaginEngine	
The SpongeBob SquarePants Movie	Game Boy Advance	December 3, 2004	WayForward	
It's Mr Pants	Game Boy Advance	December 7, 2004	Rare	
Ping Pals	Nintendo DS	December 7, 2004	WayForward	
MotoGP	J2ME	2004	Humagade	
Tetris Elements	Mac OS	2004	ImaginEngine	
Tetris Elements	Microsoft Windows	2004	ImaginEngine	
The Fairly OddParents!: Shadow Showdown	PlayStation 2	2004	Blitz Games	
Banjo-Pilot	Game Boy Advance	January 10, 2005	Rare	
The Punisher	Microsoft Windows	January 18, 2005	Volition	
The Punisher	PlayStation 2	January 18, 2005	Volition	
The Punisher	Xbox	January 18, 2005	Volition	
Constantine	PlayStation 2	February 14, 2005	Bits Studios	
Constantine	Xbox	February 14, 2005	Bits Studios	
MX vs. ATV Unleashed	PlayStation 2	March 16, 2005	Rainbow Studios	
Full Spectrum Warrior	PlayStation 2	March 22, 2005	Mass Media Games	
MX vs. ATV Unleashed	Xbox	March 24, 2005	Rainbow Studios	
Constantine	Microsoft Windows	March 2005	Bits Studios	
Worms World Party	J2ME	April 19, 2005	Codeglue	
WWE WrestleMania 21	Xbox	April 20, 2005	Studio Gigante	
Juiced	Microsoft Windows	June 14, 2005	Juice Games	
Juiced	PlayStation 2	June 14, 2005	Juice Games	
Juiced	Xbox	June 14, 2005	Juice Games	
Destroy All Humans!	PlayStation 2	June 21, 2005	Pandemic Studios	
Destroy All Humans!	Xbox	June 21, 2005	Pandemic Studios	
Big Mutha Truckers 2	PlayStation 2	August 23, 2005	Eutechnyx	
Big Mutha Truckers 2	Xbox	August 23, 2005	Eutechnyx	
Power Rangers: Dino Thunder	GameCube	August 25, 2005	Pacific Coast Power & Light	
Power Rangers: Dino Thunder	PlayStation 2	August 25, 2005	Pacific Coast Power & Light	
WWE Day of Reckoning 2	GameCube	August 29, 2005	Yuke's	
MotoGP: Ultimate Racing Technology 3	Xbox	August 30, 2005	Climax Studios	
MotoGP: Ultimate Racing Technology 3	Microsoft Windows	September 2, 2005	Climax Studios	
Scooby-Doo!: Unmasked	GameCube	September 12, 2005	Artificial Mind & Movement	
Scooby-Doo!: Unmasked	PlayStation 2	September 12, 2005	Artificial Mind & Movement	
Scooby-Doo!: Unmasked	Xbox	September 12, 2005	Artificial Mind & Movement	
Bionicle: Maze of Shadows	Game Boy Advance	September 13, 2005	Razorback Developments	
Evil Dead: Regeneration	PlayStation 2	September 13, 2005	Cranky Pants Games	
Evil Dead: Regeneration	Xbox	September 13, 2005	Cranky Pants Games	
Tak: The Great Juju Challenge	Game Boy Advance	September 19, 2005	WayForward	
Tak: The Great Juju Challenge	GameCube	September 19, 2005	Avalanche Software	
Tak: The Great Juju Challenge	Nintendo DS	September 19, 2005	Altron	
Tak: The Great Juju Challenge	PlayStation 2	September 19, 2005	Avalanche Software	
Tak: The Great Juju Challenge	Xbox	September 19, 2005	Avalanche Software	
Warhammer 40,000: Dawn of War - Winter Assault	Microsoft Windows	September 21, 2005	Relic Entertainment	
Evil Dead: Regeneration	Microsoft Windows	September 30, 2005	Beenox	
Zoo Tycoon DS	Nintendo DS	October 10, 2005	Altron	
Scooby-Doo!: Unmasked	Nintendo DS	October 18, 2005	Artificial Mind & Movement	
SpongeBob SquarePants: Lights, Camera, Pants!	PlayStation 2	October 20, 2005	THQ Studio Australia	
SpongeBob SquarePants: Lights, Camera, Pants!	Xbox	October 20, 2005	THQ Studio Australia	
Nicktoons Unite!	GameCube	October 26, 2005	Blue Tongue Entertainment	
Hello Kitty: Happy Party Pals	Game Boy Advance	October 2005	Webfoot Technologies	
Nicktoons Unite!	PlayStation 2	October 2005	Blue Tongue Entertainment	
SpongeBob SquarePants: Lights, Camera, Pants!	Game Boy Advance	October 2005	WayForward	
SpongeBob SquarePants: Lights, Camera, Pants!	Microsoft Windows	October 2005	AWE Productions	
SpongeBob SquarePants: The Yellow Avenger	Nintendo DS	November 7, 2005	Tantalus Interactive	
The Incredibles: Rise of the Underminer	GameCube	November 10, 2005	Heavy Iron Studios	
The Incredibles: Rise of the Underminer	Mac OS	November 10, 2005	Beenox	
The Incredibles: Rise of the Underminer	Microsoft Windows	November 10, 2005	Beenox	
The Incredibles: Rise of the Underminer	PlayStation 2	November 10, 2005	Heavy Iron Studios	
The Incredibles: Rise of the Underminer	Xbox	November 10, 2005	Heavy Iron Studios	
WWE Smackdown vs. Raw 2006	PlayStation 2	November 14, 2005	Yuke's, Fine Co.	
SpongeBob SquarePants: Lights, Camera, Pants!	GameCube	November 18, 2005	THQ Studio Australia	
WWE Smackdown vs. Raw 2006	PlayStation Portable	December 13, 2005	Yuke's	
Bratz: Rock Angelz	GameCube	2005	Blitz Games	
Bratz: Rock Angelz	Microsoft Windows	2005	AWE Games	
Bratz: Rock Angelz	PlayStation 2	2005	Blitz Games	
Big Mutha Truckers 2	Microsoft Windows	2005	Eutechnyx, Mere Mortals	
Ministry of Sound: Club Manager	J2ME	2005	Sherman3D	
Ministry of Sound: Ibiza Game	J2ME	2005	Kato Studios	
Star Wars: Battle Above Coruscant	J2ME	2005	Universomo	
Star Wars: Battle for the Republic	J2ME	2005	Amplified Games	
Star Wars: Grievous Getaway	J2ME	2005	Magellan Interactive	
WWE Aftershock	N-Gage	2005	Exient Entertainment	
Nicktoons Unite!	Nintendo DS	January 10, 2006	Climax Studios	
MX vs. ATV Unleashed	Microsoft Windows	January 16, 2006	Beenox	
Finding Nemo: Escape to the Big Blue	Nintendo DS	February 9, 2006	Altron	
MX vs. ATV: On the Edge	PlayStation Portable	February 27, 2006	Rainbow Studios, Tantalus Interactive	
SpongeBob SquarePants: The Yellow Avenger	PlayStation Portable	March 6, 2006	Tantalus Interactive	
The Outfit	Xbox 360	March 13, 2006	Relic Entertainment	
Worms: Open Warfare	Nintendo DS	March 22, 2006	Gamesauce, Team17	
Worms: Open Warfare	PlayStation Portable	March 22, 2006	Gamesauce, Team17	
Full Spectrum Warrior: Ten Hammers	Microsoft Windows	March 28, 2006	Pandemic Studios	
Full Spectrum Warrior: Ten Hammers	PlayStation 2	March 28, 2006	Pandemic Studios	
Full Spectrum Warrior: Ten Hammers	Xbox	March 28, 2006	Pandemic Studios	
Warhammer 40,000: Glory in Death	N-Gage	April 6, 2006	Razorback Developments	
Teen Titans	GameCube	May 24, 2006	Artificial Mind & Movement	
Teen Titans	PlayStation 2	May 24, 2006	Artificial Mind & Movement	
Cars	Game Boy Advance	June 6, 2006	Helixe, Rainbow Studios	
Cars	GameCube	June 6, 2006	Rainbow Studios	
Cars	Mac OS	June 6, 2006	Beenox	
Cars	Microsoft Windows	June 6, 2006	Beenox	
Cars	Nintendo DS	June 6, 2006	Helixe	
Cars	PlayStation 2	June 6, 2006	Rainbow Studios	
Cars	PlayStation Portable	June 6, 2006	Locomotive Games	
Cars	Xbox	June 6, 2006	Rainbow Studios	
MotoGP '06	Xbox 360	June 12, 2006	Climax Studios	
Titan Quest	Microsoft Windows	June 26, 2006	Iron Lore Entertainment, Demiurge Studios	
Juiced: Eliminator	PlayStation Portable	June 28, 2006	Juice Games	
Danny Phantom: The Ultimate Enemy	Game Boy Advance	July 7, 2006	Altron	
Monster House	Game Boy Advance	July 18, 2006	Artificial Mind & Movement	
Monster House	GameCube	July 18, 2006	Artificial Mind & Movement	
Monster House	Nintendo DS	July 18, 2006	Artificial Mind & Movement	
Monster House	PlayStation 2	July 18, 2006	Artificial Mind & Movement	
Sprint Cars: Road to Knoxville	PlayStation 2	July 26, 2006	Big Ant Studios	
Barnyard	Game Boy Advance	August 1, 2006	Halfbrick Studios	
Barnyard	GameCube	August 1, 2006	Blue Tongue Entertainment	
Barnyard	Microsoft Windows	August 1, 2006	Blue Tongue Entertainment	
Barnyard	PlayStation 2	August 1, 2006	Blue Tongue Entertainment	
My Little Pony: Crystal Princess - The Runaway Rainbow	Microsoft Windows	August 11, 2006	Webfoot Technologies	
SpongeBob SquarePants: Nighty Nightmare	Microsoft Windows	August 21, 2006	AWE Games	
Saints Row	Xbox 360	August 29, 2006	Volition	
Danny Phantom: Urban Jungle	Game Boy Advance	September 8, 2006	Altron	
The Incredibles: Rise of the Underminer	Nintendo DS	September 8, 2006	Helixe	
Company of Heroes	Microsoft Windows	September 12, 2006	Relic Entertainment	
My Little Pony: Crystal Princess - The Runaway Rainbow	Game Boy Advance	September 12, 2006	Webfoot Technologies	
Bratz: Forever Diamondz	Nintendo DS	September 18, 2006	Barking Lizards Technologies	
Danny Phantom: Urban Jungle	Nintendo DS	September 18, 2006	Altron	
Bratz: Forever Diamondz	PlayStation 2	September 20, 2006	Coyote Developments, Blitz Games	
Alex Rider: Stormbreaker	Game Boy Advance	September 25, 2006	Razorback Developments	
Alex Rider: Stormbreaker	Nintendo DS	September 27, 2006	Altron	
Scooby-Doo! Who's Watching Who	PlayStation Portable	October 2, 2006	Savage Entertainment	
Scooby-Doo! Who's Watching Who	Nintendo DS	October 9, 2006	Human Soft	
Warhammer 40,000: Dawn of War - Dark Crusade	Microsoft Windows	October 9, 2006	Relic Entertainment	
Avatar: The Last Airbender	Nintendo DS	October 10, 2006	Tose	
Avatar: The Last Airbender	GameCube	October 10, 2006	THQ Studio Australia	
Avatar: The Last Airbender	Microsoft Windows	October 10, 2006	AWE Games	
Avatar: The Last Airbender	PlayStation 2	October 10, 2006	THQ Studio Australia	
Avatar: The Last Airbender	PlayStation Portable	October 10, 2006	Tose	
Avatar: The Last Airbender	Xbox	October 10, 2006	THQ Studio Australia	
SpongeBob SquarePants: Creature from the Krusty Krab	Game Boy Advance	October 16, 2006	WayForward	
Destroy All Humans! 2	PlayStation 2	October 17, 2006	Pandemic Studios	
Destroy All Humans! 2	Xbox	October 17, 2006	Pandemic Studios	
SpongeBob SquarePants: Creature from the Krusty Krab	GameCube	October 20, 2006	Blitz Games	
SpongeBob SquarePants: Creature from the Krusty Krab	PlayStation 2	October 20, 2006	Blitz Games	
Nicktoons: Battle for Volcano Island	GameCube	October 24, 2006	Blue Tongue Entertainment	
Nicktoons: Battle for Volcano Island	PlayStation 2	October 24, 2006	Blue Tongue Entertainment	
Nicktoons: Battle for Volcano Island	Nintendo DS	October 25, 2006	Natsume Co., Ltd.	
Cars	Xbox 360	October 2006	Rainbow Studios	
Bratz: Forever Diamondz	GameCube	November 2, 2006	Coyote Developments, Blitz Games	
The Sopranos: Road to Respect	PlayStation 2	November 9, 2006	7 Studios	
Teen Titans	Xbox	November 13, 2006	Artificial Mind & Movement	
WWE Smackdown vs. Raw 2007	Xbox 360	November 14, 2006	Yuke's, Fine Co.	
Tonka On the Job	Game Boy Advance	November 17, 2006	Webfoot Technologies	
WWE Smackdown vs. Raw 2007	PlayStation 2	November 17, 2006	Yuke's, Fine Co.	
SpongeBob SquarePants: Creature from the Krusty Krab	Wii	November 18, 2006	Blitz Games	
Avatar: The Last Airbender	Wii	November 19, 2006	THQ Studio Australia	
Cars	Wii	November 19, 2006	Incinerator Studios	
WWE Smackdown vs. Raw 2007	PlayStation Portable	December 5, 2006	Yuke's, Fine Co.	
Cars: Radiator Springs Adventures	Mac OS	2006	Icculus	
Cars: Radiator Springs Adventures	Microsoft Windows	2006	AWE Games, Rainbow Studios	
Company of Heroes	J2ME	2006	Viva La Mobile	
Paws & Claws: Pet Resort	Game Boy Advance	2006	DTP Entertainment	
Paws & Claws: Pet Resort	Nintendo DS	2006	DTP Entertainment	
Star Wars: Imperial Ace	J2ME	2006	Fishlabs	
Worms	J2ME	2006	Rockpool Games	
Worms World Party	Symbian	2006	Codeglue	
Paws & Claws: Pet Vet	Nintendo DS	January 3, 2007	Independent Arts Software	
Barnyard	Wii	February 2, 2007	Blue Tongue Entertainment	
Supreme Commander	Microsoft Windows	February 20, 2007	Gas Powered Games	
Worms Crazy Golf	J2ME	February 2007	Kukan Studio	
Titan Quest: Immortal Throne	Microsoft Windows	March 8, 2007	Iron Lore Entertainment	
Tetris Evolution	Xbox 360	March 19, 2007	Mass Media Games	
S.T.A.L.K.E.R.: Shadow of Chernobyl	Microsoft Windows	March 20, 2007	GSC Game World	
Pipe Mania	J2ME	March 2007	Microjocs Mobile	
Worms 2007	J2ME	May 2007	Rockpool Games	
Ratatouille	GameCube	June 26, 2007	Asobo Studio	
Ratatouille	Mac OS	June 26, 2007	Asobo Studio	
Ratatouille	Microsoft Windows	June 26, 2007	Asobo Studio	
Ratatouille	Nintendo DS	June 26, 2007	Helixe	
Ratatouille	PlayStation 2	June 26, 2007	Asobo Studio	
Ratatouille	PlayStation Portable	June 26, 2007	Locomotive Games	
Ratatouille	Wii	June 26, 2007	Asobo Studio	
Ratatouille	Xbox	June 26, 2007	Asobo Studio	
Ratatouille	Xbox 360	June 26, 2007	Heavy Iron Studios	
Ratatouille	BREW[lower-alpha 31][lower-alpha 31][lower-alpha 31][lower-alpha 29]	June 2007	Firemint	
Ratatouille	J2ME[lower-alpha 32][lower-alpha 32][lower-alpha 32][lower-alpha 30]	June 2007	Firemint	
Drake & Josh: Talent Showdown	Nintendo DS	July 30, 2007	Artificial Mind & Movement	
MotoGP '07	Xbox 360	August 24, 2007	Climax Studios	
NHRA Drag Racing: Countdown to the Championship	PlayStation Portable	August 27, 2007	Pipeworks Software	
Stuntman: Ignition	PlayStation 2	August 28, 2007	Paradigm Entertainment	
Stuntman: Ignition	Xbox 360	August 28, 2007	Paradigm Entertainment	
Worms: Open Warfare 2	Nintendo DS	September 4, 2007	Two Tribes, Team17	
Worms: Open Warfare 2	PlayStation Portable	September 4, 2007	Team17	
Drawn to Life	Nintendo DS	September 10, 2007	5th Cell	
MotoGP '07	Microsoft Windows	September 14, 2007	Climax Studios	
Zoey 101: Field Trip Fiasco	Nintendo DS	September 15, 2007	Barking Lizards Technologies	
Juiced 2: Hot Import Nights	Nintendo DS	September 17, 2007	Juice Games	
Juiced 2: Hot Import Nights	PlayStation 2	September 17, 2007	Juice Games	
Juiced 2: Hot Import Nights	Xbox 360	September 17, 2007	Juice Games	
Stuntman: Ignition	PlayStation 3	September 17, 2007	Paradigm Entertainment	
Bratz: The Movie	PlayStation 2	September 24, 2007	Blitz Games	
Company of Heroes: Opposing Fronts	Microsoft Windows	September 25, 2007	Relic Entertainment	
Juiced 2: Hot Import Nights	PlayStation Portable	October 8, 2007	Juice Games	
Avatar: The Last Airbender - The Burning Earth	Nintendo DS	October 16, 2007	Tose	
Avatar: The Last Airbender - The Burning Earth	PlayStation 2	October 16, 2007	THQ Studio Australia	
Avatar: The Last Airbender - The Burning Earth	Wii	October 16, 2007	THQ Studio Australia	
Bratz: The Movie	Wii	October 17, 2007	Blitz Games	
Juiced 2: Hot Import Nights	PlayStation 3	October 22, 2007	Juice Games	
Conan	PlayStation 3	October 23, 2007	Nihilistic Software	
Conan	Xbox 360	October 23, 2007	Nihilistic Software	
Nicktoons: Attack of the Toybots	Nintendo DS	October 23, 2007	Natsume Co., Ltd.	
Nicktoons: Attack of the Toybots	PlayStation 2	October 23, 2007	Blue Tongue Entertainment	
Nicktoons: Attack of the Toybots	Wii	October 23, 2007	Blue Tongue Entertainment	
Ratatouille	PlayStation 3	October 23, 2007	Heavy Iron Studios	
SpongeBob's Atlantis SquarePantis	Nintendo DS	October 23, 2007	Altron	
SpongeBob's Atlantis SquarePantis	Microsoft Windows	October 23, 2007	Rainbow Studios	
Cars: Mater-National Championship	Nintendo DS	October 29, 2007	Tantalus Interactive	
Cars: Mater-National Championship	PlayStation 2	October 29, 2007	Rainbow Studios	
Cars: Mater-National Championship	PlayStation 3	October 29, 2007	Incinerator Studios	
Cars: Mater-National Championship	Xbox 360	October 29, 2007	Rainbow Studios	
El Tigre: The Adventures of Manny Rivera	Nintendo DS	October 29, 2007	Barking Lizards Technologies	
Ratatouille: Food Frenzy	Nintendo DS	October 29, 2007	Helixe	
Avatar: The Last Airbender - The Burning Earth	Game Boy Advance	October 2007	Halfbrick Studios	
Bratz 4 Real	Nintendo DS	November 5, 2007	Barking Lizards Technologies	
Supreme Commander: Forged Alliance	Microsoft Windows	November 6, 2007	Gas Powered Games	
Cars: Mater-National Championship	Wii	November 12, 2007	Incinerator Studios	
SpongeBob's Atlantis SquarePantis	Wii	November 12, 2007	Blitz Games	
Warhammer 40,000: Squad Command	PlayStation Portable	November 13, 2007	RedLynx	
WWE Smackdown vs. Raw 2008	Nintendo DS	November 13, 2007	Amaze Entertainment	
WWE Smackdown vs. Raw 2008	PlayStation 2	November 13, 2007	Yuke's	
WWE Smackdown vs. Raw 2008	PlayStation 3	November 13, 2007	Yuke's	
WWE Smackdown vs. Raw 2008	PlayStation Portable	November 13, 2007	Yuke's	
WWE Smackdown vs. Raw 2008	Wii	November 13, 2007	Yuke's	
WWE Smackdown vs. Raw 2008	Xbox 360	November 13, 2007	Yuke's	
Screwjumper!	Xbox Live Arcade	November 14, 2007	Frozen Codebase	
Avatar: The Last Airbender - The Burning Earth	Xbox 360	November 19, 2007	THQ Studio Australia	
Star Wars: The Empire Strikes Back[lower-alpha 33][lower-alpha 33][lower-alpha 33][lower-alpha 31]	BREW	November 2007	G5 Mobile	
Star Wars: The Empire Strikes Back[lower-alpha 33][lower-alpha 33][lower-alpha 33][lower-alpha 31]	J2ME	November 2007	G5 Mobile	
American Girl: Julie Finds a Way	Nintendo DS	December 3, 2007	Webfoot Technologies	
Juiced 2: Hot Import Nights	Microsoft Windows	December 7, 2007	Juice Games	
Elements of Destruction	Nintendo DS	December 17, 2007	Black Lantern Studios	
MX vs. ATV: Untamed	Nintendo DS	December 17, 2007	Tantalus Interactive, Endgame Studios	
MX vs. ATV: Untamed	PlayStation 2	December 17, 2007	Incinerator Studios	
MX vs. ATV: Untamed	PlayStation 3	December 17, 2007	Rainbow Studios	
MX vs. ATV: Untamed	PlayStation Portable	December 17, 2007	Tantalus Interactive	
MX vs. ATV: Untamed	Wii	December 17, 2007	Incinerator Studios	
MX vs. ATV: Untamed	Xbox 360	December 17, 2007	Rainbow Studios	
Warhammer 40,000: Squad Command	Nintendo DS	December 17, 2007	RedLynx	
Are You Smarter Than a 5th Grader?	Nintendo DS	2007	AWE Games	
Ratatouille: Cheese Rush	J2ME	2007	Universomo	
SpongeBob's Atlantis SquarePantis	PlayStation 2	2007	Blitz Games	
Zoo Tycoon 2 DS	Nintendo DS	February 5, 2008	Altron	
Bratz: Super Babyz	Nintendo DS	February 25, 2008	Creat Studios	
Destroy All Humans!: Big Willy Unleashed	Wii	February 25, 2008	Locomotive Games	
Frontlines: Fuel of War	Xbox 360	February 25, 2008	Kaos Studios, Demiurge Studios, THQ Studio Australia	
Frontlines: Fuel of War	Microsoft Windows	February 27, 2008	Kaos Studios, Demiurge Studios, THQ Studio Australia	
Lets Ride!: Friends Forever	Nintendo DS	March 3, 2008	Independent Arts Software	
Warhammer 40,000: Dawn of War - Soulstorm	Microsoft Windows	March 5, 2008	Iron Lore Entertainment, Relic Entertainment	
El Tigre: The Adventures of Manny Rivera	PlayStation 2	March 11, 2008	Blue Tongue Entertainment	
Sprint Cars 2: Showdown at Eldora	PlayStation 2	March 11, 2008	Big Ant Studios	
Worms: A Space Oddity	Wii	March 17, 2008	Team17	
Battle of the Bands	Wii	April 21, 2008	Planet Moon Studios	
Let's Ride: Silver Buckle Stables	PlayStation 2	May 23, 2008	Coresoft	
De Blob	iOS	June 8, 2008	Universomo	
Elements of Destruction	Xbox Live Arcade	June 18, 2008	Frozen Codebase	
American Girl: Kit Mystery Challenge!	Nintendo DS	June 23, 2008	Webfoot Technologies	
Big Beach Sports	Wii	June 23, 2008	HB Studios	
Wall-E	Mac OS	June 24, 2008	Asobo Studio	
Wall-E	Microsoft Windows	June 24, 2008	Asobo Studio	
Wall-E	Nintendo DS	June 24, 2008	Helixe	
Wall-E	PlayStation 2	June 24, 2008	Asobo Studio	
Wall-E	PlayStation 3	June 24, 2008	Heavy Iron Studios	
Wall-E	PlayStation Portable	June 24, 2008	Asobo Studio, Savage Entertainment	
Wall-E	Wii	June 24, 2008	Heavy Iron Studios	
Wall-E	Xbox 360	June 24, 2008	Heavy Iron Studios	
Lock's Quest	Nintendo DS	September 8, 2008	5th Cell	
Viva Piñata: Pocket Paradise	Nintendo DS	September 9, 2008	Rare	
Drawn to Life: SpongeBob SquarePants Edition	Nintendo DS	September 15, 2008	Altron	
Baja: Edge of Control	PlayStation 3	September 22, 2008	2XL Games	
Baja: Edge of Control	Xbox 360	September 22, 2008	2XL Games	
De Blob	Wii	September 22, 2008	Blue Tongue Entertainment	
Dropcast	Nintendo DS	September 22, 2008	Mikoishi	
My Little Pony: Pinkie Pie's Party	Nintendo DS	September 22, 2008	Webfoot Technologies	
Nancy Drew: The Hidden Staircase	Nintendo DS	September 23, 2008	AWE Games	
De Blob	BREW	September 30, 2008	Universomo	
Avatar: The Last Airbender - Into the Inferno	PlayStation 2	October 13, 2008	THQ Studio Australia	
Avatar: The Last Airbender - Into the Inferno	Wii	October 13, 2008	THQ Studio Australia	
Tak and the Guardians of Gross	PlayStation 2	October 13, 2008	Blitz Games	
Tak and the Guardians of Gross	Wii	October 13, 2008	Blitz Games	
Bratz: Girlz Really Rock	Nintendo DS	October 13, 2008	Blitz Games	
Bratz: Girlz Really Rock	PlayStation 2	October 13, 2008	Blitz Games	
Bratz: Girlz Really Rock	Wii	October 13, 2008	Blitz Games	
The Naked Brothers Band	Nintendo DS	October 13, 2008	1st Playable Productions	
Saints Row 2	PlayStation 3	October 14, 2008	Volition, Mass Media Games	
Saints Row 2	Xbox 360	October 14, 2008	Volition, Mass Media Games	
Tak: Mojo Mistake	Nintendo DS	October 14, 2008	Altron	
Are You Smarter Than a 5th Grader?: Make the Grade	Microsoft Windows	October 20, 2008	ImaginEngine	
Are You Smarter Than a 5th Grader?: Make the Grade	Nintendo DS	October 20, 2008	AWE Games	
Are You Smarter Than a 5th Grader?: Make the Grade	Wii	October 20, 2008	ImaginEngine	
Back at the Barnyard: Slop Bucket Games	Nintendo DS	October 20, 2008	Firemint	
Pass the Pigs: Let the Good Swines Roll!	Nintendo DS	October 20, 2008	AWE Games	
SpongeBob SquarePants Featuring Nicktoons: Globs of Doom	Nintendo DS	October 20, 2008	Natsume Co., Ltd.	
SpongeBob SquarePants Featuring Nicktoons: Globs of Doom	PlayStation 2	October 20, 2008	Incinerator Studios	
SpongeBob SquarePants Featuring Nicktoons: Globs of Doom	Wii	October 20, 2008	Incinerator Studios	
The Naked Brothers Band: The Video Game (Note: Published by Play THQ)	Microsoft Windows	October 20, 2008	Barking Lizards Technologies	
The Naked Brothers Band: The Video Game	PlayStation 2	October 20, 2008	Barking Lizards Technologies	
The Naked Brothers Band: The Video Game	Wii	October 20, 2008	Barking Lizards Technologies	
All Star Cheer Squad	Wii	October 26, 2008	Gorilla Systems	
Are You Smarter Than a 5th Grader?: Make the Grade	PlayStation 2	October 2008	ImaginEngine	
WWE Smackdown vs. Raw 2009	Nintendo DS	November 9, 2008	Tose	
WWE Smackdown vs. Raw 2009	PlayStation 2	November 9, 2008	Yuke's	
WWE Smackdown vs. Raw 2009	PlayStation 3	November 9, 2008	Yuke's	
WWE Smackdown vs. Raw 2009	PlayStation Portable	November 9, 2008	Yuke's	
WWE Smackdown vs. Raw 2009	Wii	November 9, 2008	Yuke's	
WWE Smackdown vs. Raw 2009	Xbox 360	November 9, 2008	Yuke's	
Avatar: The Last Airbender - Into the Inferno	Nintendo DS	November 10, 2008	Halfbrick Studios	
Merv Griffin's Crosswords	Wii	November 17, 2008	Pipeworks Software	
Gallop & Ride!	Wii	November 20, 2008	Sproing Interactive	
All Star Cheer Squad	Nintendo DS	November 24, 2008	Gorilla Systems	
Age of Empires: Mythologies	Nintendo DS	November 24, 2008	Griptonite	
Destroy All Humans: Path of the Furon	Xbox 360	December 1, 2008	Sandblast Games	
De Blob	J2ME	2008	Universomo	
Paws & Claws: Pet Vet - Healing Hands	Nintendo DS	2008	DTP Entertainment	
Short Track Racing: Trading Paint	PlayStation 2	2008	Big Ant Studios	
Saints Row 2	Microsoft Windows	January 7, 2009	CD Projekt Localisation Centre	
De Blob	BlackBerry	February 6, 2009	Universomo	
Deadly Creatures	Wii	February 9, 2009	Rainbow Studios	
Destroy All Humans: Path of the Furon	PlayStation 3	February 13, 2009	Sandblast Games	
Warhammer 40,000: Dawn of War II	Microsoft Windows	February 19, 2009	Relic Entertainment	
50 Cent: Blood on the Sand	PlayStation 3	February 20, 2009	Swordfish Studios	
50 Cent: Blood on the Sand	Xbox 360	February 20, 2009	Swordfish Studios	
The Dark Eye: Drakensang	Microsoft Windows	February 2009	Radon Labs	
SpongeBob vs. The Big One: Beach Party Cook-Off	Nintendo DS	March 3, 2009	The Fizz Factor	
Dream Day Wedding Destinations	Nintendo DS	March 9, 2009	Webfoot Technologies	
WWE Legends of WrestleMania	PlayStation 3	March 20, 2009	Yuke's	
WWE Legends of WrestleMania	Xbox 360	March 20, 2009	Yuke's	
De Blob	Android	March 2009	Universomo	
Company of Heroes: Tales of Valor	Microsoft Windows	April 9, 2009	Relic Entertainment	
Saints Row 2: Ultor Exposed	PlayStation 3	April 23, 2009	Volition	
Saints Row 2: Ultor Exposed	Xbox 360	April 23, 2009	Volition	
Desktop Tower Defense	Nintendo DS	May 11, 2009	Humagade	
Mission Runway	Nintendo DS	May 11, 2009	DTP Entertainment	
UFC 2009 Undisputed	PlayStation 3	May 19, 2009	Yuke's	
UFC 2009 Undisputed	Xbox 360	May 19, 2009	Yuke's	
Up	Nintendo DS	May 26, 2009	Altron	
Saints Row 2: Corporate Warfare	PlayStation 3	May 28, 2009	Volition	
Saints Row 2: Corporate Warfare	Xbox 360	May 28, 2009	Volition	
Red Faction: Guerrilla	PlayStation 3	June 2, 2009	Volition, Reactor Zero	
Red Faction: Guerrilla	Xbox 360	June 2, 2009	Volition, Reactor Zero	
Rocket Riot	Xbox Live Arcade	June 17, 2009	Codeglue	
Up	Mac OS	July 31, 2009	Asobo Studio, Heavy Iron Studios	
Up	Microsoft Windows	July 31, 2009	Asobo Studio, Heavy Iron Studios	
Up	PlayStation 2	July 31, 2009	Asobo Studio, Heavy Iron Studios	
Up	PlayStation 3	July 31, 2009	Heavy Iron Studios	
Up	Wii	July 31, 2009	Heavy Iron Studios	
Up	Xbox 360	July 31, 2009	Heavy Iron Studios	
Indiana Jones and the Lost Puzzles	BlackBerry	August 4, 2009	Universomo	
Red Faction: Guerrilla - Demons of the Badlands	PlayStation 3	August 13, 2009	Volition	
Red Faction: Guerrilla - Demons of the Badlands	Xbox 360	August 13, 2009	Volition	
CrimeCraft	Microsoft Windows	August 25, 2009	Vogster Entertainment	
Up	PlayStation Portable	September 11, 2009	Asobo Studio, Heavy Iron Studios	
Princess in Love	Nintendo DS	September 14, 2009	DTP Entertainment	
James Patterson: Women's Murder Club - Games of Passion	Nintendo DS	September 15, 2009	Griptonite	
Red Faction: Guerrilla	Microsoft Windows	September 15, 2009	Volition, Reactor Zero	
Fabulous Finds	Nintendo DS	September 21, 2009	Webfoot Technologies	
Indiana Jones and the Lost Puzzles	iOS	September 30, 2009	Universomo	
The Biggest Loser	Nintendo DS	October 6, 2009	Webfoot Technologies	
The Biggest Loser	Wii	October 6, 2009	Blitz Games	
Drawn to Life: The Next Chapter	Nintendo DS	October 8, 2009	5th Cell	
Cars: Race-O-Rama	Nintendo DS	October 12, 2009	Tantalus Media	
Cars: Race-O-Rama	PlayStation Portable	October 12, 2009	Tantalus Media	
Cars: Race-O-Rama	PlayStation 2	October 13, 2009	Incinerator Studios	
Cars: Race-O-Rama	PlayStation 3	October 13, 2009	Incinerator Studios	
Cars: Race-O-Rama	Wii	October 13, 2009	Incinerator Studios	
Cars: Race-O-Rama	Xbox 360	October 13, 2009	Incinerator Studios	
Marvel Super Hero Squad	Nintendo DS	October 20, 2009	Halfbrick Studios	
Marvel Super Hero Squad	PlayStation Portable	October 20, 2009	Mass Media Games	
Marvel Super Hero Squad	Wii	October 20, 2009	Blue Tongue Entertainment	
WWE Smackdown vs. Raw 2010	Nintendo DS	October 20, 2009	Tose	
WWE Smackdown vs. Raw 2010	PlayStation 2	October 20, 2009	Yuke's	
WWE Smackdown vs. Raw 2010	PlayStation 3	October 20, 2009	Yuke's	
WWE Smackdown vs. Raw 2010	PlayStation Portable	October 20, 2009	Yuke's	
WWE Smackdown vs. Raw 2010	Wii	October 20, 2009	Yuke's	
WWE Smackdown vs. Raw 2010	Xbox 360	October 20, 2009	Yuke's	
Marvel Super Hero Squad	PlayStation 2	October 23, 2009	Mass Media Games	
Are You Smarter Than a 5th Grader?: Game Time	Nintendo DS	October 26, 2009	AWE Games	
Are You Smarter Than a 5th Grader?: Game Time	Wii	October 26, 2009	ImaginEngine	
Are You Smarter Than a 5th Grader?: Game Time	Xbox 360	October 26, 2009	ImaginEngine	
SpongeBob's Truth or Square	Nintendo DS	October 26, 2009	Altron	
SpongeBob's Truth or Square	Wii	October 26, 2009	Heavy Iron Studios	
World of Zoo	Microsoft Windows	October 26, 2009	Blue Fang Games	
World of Zoo	Nintendo DS	October 26, 2009	1st Playable Productions	
World of Zoo	Wii	October 26, 2009	Blue Fang Games, Demiurge Studios	
Drawn to Life: The Next Chapter	Wii	October 27, 2009	Planet Moon Studios	
SpongeBob's Truth or Square	Xbox 360	November 13, 2009	Heavy Iron Studios	
Big Family Games	Wii	November 17, 2009	Jet Black Games	
Star Wars: Trench Run	iOS	November 17, 2009	Infrared5	
MX vs ATV Reflex	Microsoft Windows	November 26, 2009	Double Helix Studios	
MX vs ATV Reflex	Nintendo DS	December 1, 2009	Tantalus Media	
MX vs ATV Reflex	PlayStation 3	December 1, 2009	Rainbow Studios	
MX vs ATV Reflex	Xbox 360	December 1, 2009	Rainbow Studios	
Indiana Jones and the Lost Puzzles	Android	2009	Universomo	
Indiana Jones and the Lost Puzzles	J2ME	2009	Universomo	
Indiana Jones and the Lost Puzzles	Windows Mobile	2009	Universomo	
Darksiders	PlayStation 3	January 5, 2010	Vigil Games, Mass Media Games	
Darksiders	Xbox 360	January 5, 2010	Vigil Games, Mass Media Games	
Daniel X: The Ultimate Power	Nintendo DS	January 10, 2010	Griptonite	
Star Wars: Trench Run	Browser	February 3, 2010	Infrared5	
World of Outlaws: Sprint Cars	Xbox 360	February 9, 2010	Big Ant Studios	
SpongeBob's Boating Bash	Nintendo DS	March 2, 2010	Firebrand Games	
SpongeBob's Boating Bash	Wii	March 2, 2010	Impulse Games	
Warhammer 40,000: Dawn of War II - Chaos Rising	Microsoft Windows	March 11, 2010	Relic Entertainment	
Metro 2033	Microsoft Windows	March 16, 2010	4A Games	
Metro 2033	Xbox 360	March 16, 2010	4A Games	
All Star Karate	Wii	March 19, 2010	Blitz Games	
Beat City	Nintendo DS	March 20, 2010	Universomo	
Star Wars: Cantina	iOS	April 2, 2010	Universomo	
World of Outlaws: Sprint Cars	PlayStation 3	May 11, 2010	Big Ant Studios	
UFC Undisputed 2010	PlayStation 3	May 28, 2010	Yuke's	
UFC Undisputed 2010	Xbox 360	May 28, 2010	Yuke's	
Big Beach Sports 2	Wii	June 25, 2010	Jet Black Games	
The Last Airbender	Nintendo DS	June 29, 2010	Halfbrick Studios	
The Last Airbender	Wii	June 29, 2010	THQ Studio Australia	
Vampire Legends: Power of Three	Nintendo DS	June 29, 2010	DTP Entertainment	
Star Wars: Cantina	J2ME	June 2010	Universomo	
Paws & Claws: Regal Resort	Nintendo DS	July 13, 2010	Webfoot Technologies	
Star Wars: The Battle for Hoth	iOS	July 15, 2010	FluffyLogic	
Fancy Nancy: Tea Party Time!	Nintendo DS	September 14, 2010	Webfoot Technologies	
Truth or Lies	PlayStation 3	September 14, 2010	Big Ant Studios	
Truth or Lies	Wii	September 14, 2010	Big Ant Studios	
Truth or Lies	Xbox 360	September 14, 2010	Big Ant Studios	
Darksiders	Microsoft Windows	September 23, 2010	Vigil Games, Mass Media Games	
Darksiders	OnLive	September 23, 2010	Vigil Games, Mass Media Games	
Scripps Spelling Bee	Nintendo DS	October 5, 2010	Webfoot Technologies	
Wheel of Fortune	Xbox 360	October 16, 2010	Pipeworks Studios	
Star Wars Arcade: Falcon Gunner	iOS	October 17, 2010	Vertigore Games	
Costume Quest	PlayStation 3	October 20, 2010	Double Fine Productions	
Costume Quest	Xbox Live Arcade	October 20, 2010	Double Fine Productions	
WWE Smackdown vs. Raw 2011	PlayStation 2	October 26, 2010	Yuke's	
WWE Smackdown vs. Raw 2011	PlayStation 3	October 26, 2010	Yuke's	
WWE Smackdown vs. Raw 2011	Wii	October 26, 2010	Yuke's	
WWE Smackdown vs. Raw 2011	Xbox 360	October 26, 2010	Yuke's	
UFC Undisputed 2010	PlayStation Portable	October 29, 2010	Yuke's	
Star Wars: The Battle for Hoth	Windows Phone	October 2010	FluffyLogic	
Are You Smarter Than A 5th Grader?: Back To School	Nintendo DS	November 2, 2010	ImaginEngine	
Are You Smarter Than A 5th Grader?: Back To School	Wii	November 2, 2010	ImaginEngine	
Jeopardy!	Nintendo DS	November 2, 2010	Griptonite	
Jeopardy!	Wii	November 2, 2010	Pipeworks Software	
Megamind: Mega Team Unite	Wii	November 2, 2010	THQ Studio Australia	
Megamind: The Blue Defender	Nintendo DS	November 2, 2010	Tantalus Media	
Megamind: The Blue Defender	PlayStation 3	November 2, 2010	THQ Studio Australia	
Megamind: The Blue Defender	PlayStation Portable	November 2, 2010	Tantalus Media	
Megamind: The Blue Defender	Xbox 360	November 2, 2010	THQ Studio Australia	
The Penguins of Madagascar	Nintendo DS	November 2, 2010	Griptonite	
Wheel of Fortune	Nintendo DS	November 2, 2010	Griptonite, Pipeworks Studios	
Wheel of Fortune	Wii	November 2, 2010	Pipeworks Studios	
The Biggest Loser: Ultimate Workout	Kinect	November 4, 2010	Blitz Games	
The Biggest Loser: Ultimate Workout	Wii	November 4, 2010	Blitz Games	
Dood's Big Adventure	Wii	November 14, 2010	THQ Digital Studios Phoenix	
Pictionary	Nintendo DS	November 14, 2010	ImaginEngine	
uDraw Pictionary	Wii	November 14, 2010	Page 44 Studios	
uDraw Studio	Wii	November 14, 2010	Pipeworks Studios	
Marvel Super Hero Squad: The Infinity Gauntlet	PlayStation 3	November 16, 2010	Griptonite	
Marvel Super Hero Squad: The Infinity Gauntlet	Wii	November 16, 2010	Griptonite	
Marvel Super Hero Squad: The Infinity Gauntlet	Xbox 360	November 16, 2010	Griptonite	
Pictionary	Xbox 360	November 18, 2010	Page 44 Studios	
Hot Wheels: Track Attack	Nintendo DS	November 23, 2010	Firebrand Games	
Worms: Battle Islands	Wii	November 23, 2010	Team17	
Hot Wheels: Track Attack	Wii	November 2010	Firebrand Games	
Costume Quest: Grubbins on Ice	Xbox 360	December 8, 2010	Double Fine Productions	
Star Wars: Cantina	Windows Phone	December 8, 2010	Universomo	
Costume Quest: Grubbins on Ice	PlayStation 3	December 21, 2010	Double Fine Productions	
Ghost Pirates of Vooju Island	Microsoft Windows	2010	Autumn Moon Entertainment, MunkyFun	
Metro 2033	OnLive	January 6, 2011	4A Games	
Paws & Claws: Marine Rescue	Nintendo DS	January 25, 2011	DTP Entertainment	
Warhammer 40,000: Dawn of War II - Chaos Rising	OnLive	February 3, 2011	Relic Entertainment	
Stacking	PlayStation Network	February 8, 2011	Double Fine Productions	
Stacking	Xbox Live Arcade	February 8, 2011	Double Fine Productions	
You Don't Know Jack	Microsoft Windows	February 8, 2011	Jellyvision Games	
You Don't Know Jack	Nintendo DS	February 8, 2011	Jellyvision Games	
You Don't Know Jack	PlayStation 3	February 8, 2011	Jellyvision Games	
You Don't Know Jack	Wii	February 8, 2011	Jellyvision Games	
You Don't Know Jack	Xbox 360	February 8, 2011	Jellyvision Games	
Dance Paradise	Kinect	February 15, 2011	Smack Down Productions	
De Blob 2	Nintendo DS	February 22, 2011	Halfbrick Studios	
De Blob 2	PlayStation 3	February 22, 2011	Blue Tongue Entertainment	
De Blob 2	Wii	February 22, 2011	Blue Tongue Entertainment	
De Blob 2	Xbox 360	February 22, 2011	Blue Tongue Entertainment	
Warhammer 40,000: Dawn of War II - Retribution	Microsoft Windows	March 1, 2011	Relic Entertainment	
Homefront	Microsoft Windows	March 15, 2011	Digital Extremes	
WWE All Stars	PlayStation 2	March 29, 2011	Subdued Software	
WWE All Stars	PlayStation 3	March 29, 2011	THQ San Diego	
WWE All Stars	PlayStation Portable	March 29, 2011	Subdued Software	
WWE All Stars	Wii	March 29, 2011	Subdued Software	
WWE All Stars	Xbox 360	March 29, 2011	THQ San Diego	
Red Faction: Battlegrounds	PlayStation 3	April 5, 2011	THQ Digital Studios UK	
Stacking: The Lost Hobo King	PlayStation 3	April 5, 2011	Double Fine Productions	
Red Faction: Battlegrounds	Xbox 360	April 6, 2011	THQ Digital Studios UK	
Stacking: The Lost Hobo King	Xbox 360	April 6, 2011	Double Fine Productions	
Rio	Nintendo DS	April 12, 2011	1st Playable Productions	
Rio	PlayStation 3	April 12, 2011	Eurocom	
Rio	Wii	April 12, 2011	Eurocom	
Rio	Xbox 360	April 12, 2011	Eurocom	
SpongeBob SquigglePants	Wii	April 12, 2011	WayForward	
Fantastic Pets	Kinect	April 12, 2011	Blitz Games	
MX vs. ATV Alive	PlayStation 3	May 13, 2011	THQ Digital Studios Phoenix	
MX vs. ATV Alive	Xbox 360	May 13, 2011	THQ Digital Studios Phoenix	
SpongeBob SquigglePants 3D	Nintendo 3DS	May 17, 2011	WayForward	
Kung Fu Panda 2	Nintendo DS	May 24, 2011	Griptonite	
Kung Fu Panda 2	PlayStation 3	May 24, 2011	Griptonite	
Kung Fu Panda 2	Wii	May 24, 2011	Griptonite	
Kung Fu Panda 2	Xbox 360	May 24, 2011	Griptonite	
Red Faction: Armageddon	Microsoft Windows	June 7, 2011	Volition	
Red Faction: Armageddon	PlayStation 3	June 7, 2011	Volition	
Red Faction: Armageddon	Xbox 360	June 7, 2011	Volition	
UFC: Personal Trainer	Kinect	June 28, 2011	Heavy Iron Studios	
UFC: Personal Trainer	PlayStation 3	June 28, 2011	Heavy Iron Studios	
UFC: Personal Trainer	Wii	July 12, 2011	Heavy Iron Studios	
Warhammer 40,000: Kill Team	Xbox Live Arcade	July 13, 2011	THQ Digital Studios UK, Relic Entertainment	
Red Faction: Armageddon - Path to War	Microsoft Windows	August 2, 2011	Volition	
Red Faction: Armageddon - Path to War	PlayStation 3	August 2, 2011	Volition	
Red Faction: Armageddon - Path to War	Xbox 360	August 2, 2011	Volition	
Warhammer 40,000: Kill Team	PlayStation 3	August 2, 2011	THQ Digital Studios UK, Relic Entertainment	
The Penguins of Madagascar: Dr. Blowhole Returns Again!	Nintendo DS	September 6, 2011	Griptonite	
The Penguins of Madagascar: Dr. Blowhole Returns Again!	Wii	September 6, 2011	Griptonite	
Warhammer 40,000: Space Marine	Microsoft Windows	September 6, 2011	Relic Entertainment, Mass Media Games	
Warhammer 40,000: Space Marine	PlayStation 3	September 6, 2011	Relic Entertainment, Mass Media Games	
Warhammer 40,000: Space Marine	Xbox 360	September 6, 2011	Relic Entertainment, Mass Media Games	
The Penguins of Madagascar: Dr. Blowhole Returns Again!	PlayStation 3	September 13, 2011	Griptonite	
Barbie Jet, Set & Style	Nintendo DS	September 20, 2011	Game Machine Studios	
Barbie Jet, Set & Style	Wii	September 20, 2011	Game Machine Studios	
AC-130: Operation Devastation	OnLive	September 22, 2011	Frozen Codebase	
Elizabeth Find M.D.: Diagnosis Mystery	OnLive	September 22, 2011	Gunnar Games	
Frontlines: Fuel of War	OnLive	September 22, 2011	Kaos Studios, Demiurge Studios, THQ Studio Australia	
Homefront	OnLive	September 22, 2011	Digital Extremes	
MX vs ATV Reflex	OnLive	September 22, 2011	Double Helix Games	
Puzzle Quest: Challenge of the Warlords	OnLive	September 22, 2011	Infinite Interactive, Vicious Cycle Software	
Red Faction: Armageddon	OnLive	September 22, 2011	Volition	
Red Faction: Guerrilla	OnLive	September 22, 2011	Volition, Reactor Zero	
Saints Row 2	OnLive	September 22, 2011	CD Projekt Localisation Centre	
S.T.A.L.K.E.R.: Shadow of Chernobyl	OnLive	September 22, 2011	GSC Game World	
Supreme Commander	OnLive	September 22, 2011	Gas Powered Games	
Supreme Commander: Forged Alliance	OnLive	September 22, 2011	Gas Powered Games	
Warhammer 40,000: Space Marine	OnLive	September 22, 2011	Relic Entertainment, Mass Media Games	
Marvel Super Hero Squad: The Infinity Gauntlet	Nintendo 3DS	October 11, 2011	Griptonite	
Monster High: Ghoul Spirit	Nintendo DS	October 11, 2011	ImaginEngine	
Monster High: Ghoul Spirit	Wii	October 11, 2011	ImaginEngine	
Homefront	PlayStation 3	October 15, 2011	Kaos Studios	
Homefront	Xbox 360	October 15, 2011	Kaos Studios	
Puss in Boots	Nintendo DS	October 25, 2011	ImaginEngine	
Puss in Boots	PlayStation 3	October 25, 2011	Blitz Games	
Puss in Boots	Wii	October 25, 2011	Blitz Games	
Puss in Boots	Xbox 360	October 25, 2011	Blitz Games	
Disney Princess: Enchanting Storybooks	Nintendo DS	November 1, 2011	Page 44 Studios	
Disney Princess: Enchanting Storybooks	Wii	November 1, 2011	Page 44 Studios	
Deepak Chopra's Leela	Wii	November 8, 2011	Curious Pictures, N-Fusion	
SpongeBob's Surf & Skate Roadtrip	Nintendo DS	November 8, 2011	Blitz Games	
Marvel Super Hero Squad: Comic Combat	PlayStation 3	November 15, 2011	Griptonite	
Marvel Super Hero Squad: Comic Combat	Wii	November 15, 2011	Griptonite	
Marvel Super Hero Squad: Comic Combat	Xbox 360	November 15, 2011	Griptonite	
Saints Row: The Third	Microsoft Windows	November 15, 2011	Volition, Agora Games	
Saints Row: The Third	PlayStation 3	November 15, 2011	Volition, Agora Games	
Saints Row: The Third	Xbox 360	November 15, 2011	Volition, Agora Games	
uDraw Studio: Instant Artist	PlayStation 3	November 15, 2011	Pipeworks Software	
uDraw Studio: Instant Artist	Wii	November 15, 2011	Pipeworks Software	
uDraw Studio: Instant Artist	Xbox 360	November 15, 2011	Pipeworks Software	
WWE '12	PlayStation 3	November 22, 2011	Yuke's	
WWE '12	Wii	November 22, 2011	Yuke's	
WWE '12	Xbox 360	November 22, 2011	Yuke's	
Voltron: Defender of the Universe	PlayStation Network	November 29, 2011	Behaviour Interactive	
Voltron: Defender of the Universe	Xbox Live Arcade	November 29, 2011	Behaviour Interactive	
Deepak Chopra's Leela	Kinect	2011	Curious Pictures, N-Fusion	
Amnesia: The Dark Descent	Microsoft Windows	2011	Frictional Games	
Saints Row: The Third - Genkibowl VII	Microsoft Windows	January 17, 2012	Volition	
Saints Row: The Third - Genkibowl VII	PlayStation 3	January 17, 2012	Volition	
Saints Row: The Third - Genkibowl VII	Xbox 360	January 17, 2012	Volition	
UFC Undisputed 3	PlayStation 3	February 14, 2012	Yuke's	
UFC Undisputed 3	Xbox 360	February 14, 2012	Yuke's	
Saints Row: The Third - Gangstas in Space	Microsoft Windows	February 21, 2012	Volition	
Saints Row: The Third - Gangstas in Space	PlayStation 3	February 21, 2012	Volition	
Saints Row: The Third - Gangstas in Space	Xbox 360	February 21, 2012	Volition	
Nexuiz	Xbox 360	February 29, 2012	IllFonic	
Saints Row: The Third - The Trouble with Clones	Microsoft Windows	March 20, 2012	Volition	
Saints Row: The Third - The Trouble with Clones	PlayStation 3	March 20, 2012	Volition	
Saints Row: The Third - The Trouble with Clones	Xbox 360	March 20, 2012	Volition	
Nexuiz	Microsoft Windows	May 10, 2012	IllFonic	
Darksiders II	Microsoft Windows	August 14, 2012	Vigil Games, Blue Shift, Relic Entertainment, THQ San Diego, THQ Studio Montréal	
Darksiders II	PlayStation 3	August 14, 2012	Vigil Games, Blue Shift, Relic Entertainment, THQ San Diego, THQ Studio Montréal	
Darksiders II	Xbox 360	August 14, 2012	Vigil Games, Blue Shift, Relic Entertainment, THQ San Diego, THQ Studio Montréal	
WWE '13	PlayStation 3	October 30, 2012	Yuke's	
WWE '13	Wii	October 30, 2012	Yuke's	
WWE '13	Xbox 360	October 30, 2012	Yuke's	
Darksiders II	Wii U	November 18, 2012	Vigil Games	
Jeopardy!	Wii U	November 18, 2012	Pipeworks Software	
Wheel of Fortune	Wii U	December 14, 2012	Pipeworks Software	
Jeopardy!	PlayStation 3	2012	Pipeworks Software	
Jeopardy!	Xbox 360	2012	Pipeworks Software	

== Distributed titles ==
Title	Platform(s)	Release date	Developer
NHL 96	Game Boy	1996	Probe Software
SimCity 2000	Super Nintendo Entertainment System	1996	Dice Co., HAL Laboratory
Time Killers	Sega Genesis	1996	Incredible Technologies
Madden NFL 98	Super Nintendo Entertainment System	November 1997	Tiertex Design Studios
NBA Live 98	Super Nintendo Entertainment System	November 1997	Tiertex Design Studios
FIFA: Road to World Cup 98	Game Boy	1997	Tiertex Design Studios
Madden NFL 98	Sega Genesis	1997	Tiertex Design Studios
NHL 98	Super Nintendo Entertainment System	1997	Electronic Arts
Tokyo Highway Battle	PlayStation	1997	Genki
Brunswick Circuit Pro Bowling	PlayStation	November 1998	Adrenalin Interactive
Star Wars: Episode I - Racer	Microsoft Windows	1999	LucasArts
Star Wars: X-Wing Alliance	Microsoft Windows	1999	Totally Games
Star Wars: Force Commander	Microsoft Windows	March 23, 2000	LucasArts
Tomb Raider starring Lara Croft	Game Boy Color	June 12, 2000	Core Design
Anpfiff: Der RTL Fussball-Manager	Microsoft Windows	2000	Silver Style Entertainment
Der Clown	Microsoft Windows	April 10, 2001	Silver Style Entertainment
Coaster Works	Dreamcast	June 29, 2001	Bimboosoft
Carrier	Dreamcast	July 5, 2001	Jaleco
Earthworm Jim	Game Boy Advance	September 21, 2001	Game Titan
Iridion 3D	Game Boy Advance	September 21, 2001	Shin'en Multimedia, Pipedream Interactive
Fortress	Game Boy Advance	November 23, 2001	Pipedream Interactive
Conker's Bad Fur Day	Nintendo 64	2001	Rare
Star Wars: Episode I - Battle for Naboo	Nintendo 64	2001	Factor 5, LucasArts
Boxing Fever	Game Boy Advance	February 22, 2002	Digital Fiction
G1 Jockey	PlayStation 2	March 8, 2002	Koei
Dynasty Warriors 3	PlayStation 2	March 22, 2002	Omega Force
Fisherman's Bass Club	PlayStation 2	April 22, 2002	Vingt-et-un Systems
Zanzarah: The Hidden Portal	Microsoft Windows	April 26, 2002	Funatics
Iron Aces 2: Birds of Prey	PlayStation 2	May 10, 2002	Kadokawa Shoten
Gitaroo Man	PlayStation 2	June 21, 2002	Inis Corporation
Circus Maximus: Chariot Wars	Xbox	June 2002	Kodiak Interactive
Circus Maximus: Chariot Wars	PlayStation 2	July 5, 2002	Kodiak Interactive
Super Monkey Ball Jr.	Game Boy Advance	November 20, 2002	Realism/Creations
RTL Skispringen 2003	Microsoft Windows	November 21, 2002	VCC Entertainment
Dynasty Warriors 3	Xbox	December 6, 2002	Omega Force
Mystic Heroes	GameCube	December 13, 2002	Koei
Fila Decathlon	Game Boy Advance	2002	Athletic Design, Hokus Pokus
Fila World Tour Tennis	Microsoft Windows	2002	Hokus Pokus
Fila World Tour Tennis	Xbox	2002	Hokus Pokus
Lethal Skies: Elite Pilot - Team SW	PlayStation 2	2002	Bit Town
Top Angler	PlayStation 2	2002	SIMS Co.
Xtreme Air Racing	Microsoft Windows	2002	Victory Simulations
Daredevil	Game Boy Advance	March 21, 2003	Griptonite
Mystic Heroes	PlayStation 2	March 21, 2003	Koei
EVE Online	Microsoft Windows	May 6, 2003	CCP Games
ATV Offroad Fury 2	PlayStation 2	September 17, 2003	Rainbow Studios
Disney's Kim Possible: Revenge of Monkey Fist	Game Boy Advance	November 21, 2003	Digital Eclipse
Dynasty Tactics 2	PlayStation 2	November 28, 2003	Koei
Das große RTL-Quiz	Microsoft Windows	December 2003	Limbic Entertainment
Drome Racers	Game Boy Advance	2003	Möbius Entertainment
RTL Skispringen 2004	Microsoft Windows	2003	VCC Entertainment
RTL Skispringen 2004	PlayStation 2	2003	VCC Entertainment
Disney's Brother Bear	Game Boy Advance	January 23, 2004	Vicarious Visions
Shining Soul II	Game Boy Advance	March 19, 2004	Grasshopper Manufacture
Romance of the Three Kingdoms VIII	PlayStation 2	March 26, 2004	Koei
AFL Live: Premiership Edition	PlayStation 2	April 19, 2004	IR Gurus
Puyo Pop Fever	Game Boy Advance	July 24, 2004	Sonic Team
Crimson Sea 2	PlayStation 2	September 10, 2004	Koei
Astro Boy: Omega Factor	Game Boy Advance	2004	Hitmaker
Phantom Brave	PlayStation 2	February 2005	Nippon Ichi Software
Disney's Cinderella: Magical Dreams	Game Boy Advance	October 28, 2005	DC Studios
Dynasty Warriors 4	Microsoft Windows	December 8, 2005	Omega Force
Stubbs the Zombie in Rebel Without a Pulse	Xbox	December 9, 2005	Wideload Games, Chewy Software
Psychonauts	Microsoft Windows	December 16, 2005	Double Fine Productions
Gunstar Super Heroes	Game Boy Advance	2005	Treasure
Majesco's Rec Room Challenge	Game Boy Advance	2005	Skyworks Technologies
Psychonauts	Xbox	January 26, 2006	Double Fine Productions
Psychonauts	PlayStation 2	February 3, 2006	Budcat Creations
BloodRayne 2	Microsoft Windows	February 10, 2006	Terminal Reality
Nanostray	Nintendo DS	February 10, 2006	Shin'en Multimedia
BloodRayne 2	PlayStation 2	February 17, 2006	Terminal Reality
BloodRayne 2	Xbox	February 17, 2006	Terminal Reality
Raze's Hell	Xbox	February 17, 2006	Artech Studios
Stubbs the Zombie in Rebel Without a Pulse	Microsoft Windows	February 17, 2006	Aspyr
Samurai Warriors: State of War	PlayStation Portable	March 24, 2006	Omega Force
Æon Flux	PlayStation 2	April 14, 2006	Terminal Reality
Æon Flux	Xbox	April 14, 2006	Terminal Reality
ATV Quad Frenzy	Nintendo DS	May 26, 2006	Skyworks Technologies
Advent Rising	Microsoft Windows	June 10, 2006	GlyphX Games
Secrets of the Ark: A Broken Sword Game	Microsoft Windows	September 14, 2006	Revolution Software, Sumo Digital
Infected	PlayStation Portable	September 29, 2006	Planet Moon Studios
Gitaroo Man Lives!	PlayStation Portable	October 5, 2006	Inis Corporation
Disney's American Dragon: Jake Long - Rise of the Huntsclan!	Game Boy Advance	October 17, 2006	WayForward
Jaws: Unleashed	Microsoft Windows	October 19, 2006	Appaloosa Interactive
Lumines II	PlayStation Portable	November 23, 2006	Q Entertainment
Super Monkey Ball: Banana Blitz	Wii	December 7, 2006	Amusement Vision
Sonic and the Secret Rings	Wii	March 8, 2007	Sonic Team, Now Production
Crush	PlayStation Portable	May 31, 2007	Zoë Mode
Glory Days 2	Nintendo DS	August 24, 2007	ODenis Studio
Death to Spies	Microsoft Windows	October 11, 2007	Haggard Games
Fantasy Wars	Microsoft Windows	October 25, 2007	1C: Ino-Co
D.I.R.T.: Origin of the Species	Microsoft Windows	2007	Nu Generation Games
Hard to Be a God	Microsoft Windows	February 8, 2008	Akella
Dragoneer's Aria	PlayStation Portable	February 15, 2008	Hit Maker
Cooking Mama 2: Dinner with Friends	Nintendo DS	December 12, 2008	Office Create
Clever Kids: Farmyard Fun	Microsoft Windows	2008	Gamerholix
Clever Kids: Pirates	Microsoft Windows	2008	Gamerholix
Ace Attorney Investigations: Miles Edgeworth	Nintendo DS	February 18, 2009	Capcom
Dynasty Warriors: Gundam 2	PlayStation 3	April 24, 2009	Koei
Dynasty Warriors: Gundam 2	Xbox 360	April 24, 2009	Koei
League of Legends	Microsoft Windows	October 27, 2009	Riot Games
