= Danny Phantom: Urban Jungle =

2006 video game

- North American Nintendo DS box art
- Developer(s): Altron
- Publisher(s): THQ
- Director(s): Keisuke Ota (DS); Yuhei Fujita (GBA)
- Producer(s): Keisuke Ota
- Programmer(s): Shinya Nagakawa; Keisuke Ota; Shinya Odaira (DS); Shimpei Echigo; Koji Kanagaki (GBA)
- Artist(s): Daisuke Nakano; Yotaro Doi; Keiko Miyazawa; Yuhei Fujita; Tomoya Hiwatari; Marika Tanimoto
- Composer(s): Tomoyoshi Sato
- Platform(s): Nintendo DS, Game Boy Advance
- Release: Nintendo DS: NA: September 19, 2006; EU: March 2, 2007; AU: May 31, 2007; Game Boy Advance: NA: September 19, 2006; EU: March 14, 2007
- Genre(s): Side-scroller
- Mode(s): Single-player, multiplayer

Danny Phantom: Urban Jungle is a side-scrolling video game developed by Altron and published by THQ for the Game Boy Advance and Nintendo DS handhelds. It is based on the episode "Urban Jungle" from the Nickelodeon television series Danny Phantom and is the second video game for the series, after Danny Phantom: The Ultimate Enemy. Players play the role of Danny Phantom in his adventure to save Amity Park from various villains from the show.

== Story ==
Danny, Sam, and Tucker are preparing a movie night when Undergrowth appears and shakes Fentonworks with an earthquake. Danny is unable to defeat Undergrowth, and heads into the Ghost Zone to search for a way to defeat him. In the Ghost Zone, he meets Frostbite, who teaches Danny how to use ice powers.

When Danny returns from the Ghost Zone, Tucker warns him that Undergrowth has kidnapped Sam to turn her into his "plant girl". Danny then fights and defeats the plant-clone of Sam, and carries the real Sam back to safety. Sam reveals that she found Undergrowth's core, and Danny suggests that they keep the core safe in Walker's Prison. Sam and Tucker decide to accompany Danny in the Ghost Zone with the Fenton Flyer vehicle.

Upon reaching Walker's Prison, the prison inmates bump into Danny and steal the core. Walker bargains with Danny into capturing the escaped inmates for him. During the fight in the prison, the Lunch Lady Ghost and Technus escape. After battling Youngblood's pirate ship, Danny, Sam, and Tucker head back to Amity Park. When they return, Danny is zapped into the Internet by Technus and battles three of his forms.

Danny manages to escape the Internet and ends up at Casper High. Sam finds him and reveals that the Lunch Lady Ghost has turned Tucker into a meat monster. The Lunch Lady Ghost and Undergrowth then team up to create Meat-N-Potatoes. Danny defeats all three of the ghosts to save Amity Park and finally enjoys a movie night with his friends.

== Reception ==
Reception

Aggregate scores
Aggregator	Score
GameRankings	GBA: 59.00% DS: 65.33%
Metacritic	GBA: 57/100; DS: 61/100

Review scores
Publication	Score
GameZone	GBA: 7.6/10; DS: 7/10
IGN	6/10

Danny Phantom: Urban Jungle received mixed reviews from critics upon release for both the Game Boy Advance and Nintendo DS versions. On Metacritic, the game holds scores of 57/100 for the Game Boy Advance version (based on 4 reviews) and 61/100 for the Nintendo DS version (based on 9 reviews). On GameRankings, the game holds scores of 59.00% for the Game Boy Advance version (based on 4 reviews) and 65.33% for the Nintendo DS version (based on 9 reviews).
