= Sky Sports Football Quiz Season 02 =

2002 video game

- PlayStation cover art
- Developer: Hothouse Creations
- Publisher: THQ
- Platforms: PlayStation, PC
- Release: EU: June 7, 2002
- Genre: Quiz

Sky Sports Football Quiz Season 02 is a 2002 football sports trivia quiz video game released for the PlayStation and PC platforms. The game was developed by Hothouse Creations and published by THQ. The game is a follow-up to Sky Sports Football Quiz and features television presenter Kirsty Gallacher.

== Gameplay ==
Just like its predecessor, Sky Sports Football Quiz Season 02 is a sports trivia quiz game that tests the player's knowledge of football.

The player is able to choose between four modes; Penalty Shootout, where the player has to answer questions correctly to score goals, Man of the Match where the player/players take turns attacking and defending by answering questions, League Championship, where the player plays the game throughout an entire football season. The player answers two questions against a Premier League team and each answer determines the match score. The final mode is Dream Team, in which the player earns money to form a football team. Each question in all four of the modes features a photograph relevant to the question.

== Development ==
Sky Sports Football Quiz Season 02 was developed by Hothouse Creations and was published by THQ for the PlayStation and PC platforms in 2002. The game's quizmaster is the television presenter Kirsty Gallacher, and it received new statstics and questions.

== Reception ==
Steve Hill of PC Zone gave the title a score of 50/100, describing it as a "rehash" of the previous game in the series, albeit with a refreshed set of questions. Official PlayStation Magazine labelled the game as a "top quizzer that's great with mates", awarding a score of 7/10, but cautioned that "only footie fans should bother". It also noted that the title was "part of the glut of games looking to cash-in on the inevitable World Cup hype". The Russian magazine Computer was complimentary of the game's music and of the graphics, calling the gameplay "High-quality, even by the standards of soccer experts."

The Russian video game magazine Game World Navigator called Sky Sports Football Quiz Season 02 "just average" and recommended the title to players who were hesitant to "go head-to-head with giants like FIFA Soccer and Championship Manager." GamesMaster magazine gave it a 65 per cent rating and described it as "More fun than you would expect, especially the bit where you build up an All Star XI with your footy brain."
