= MTV Sports: T.J. Lavin's Ultimate BMX =

2001 video game

- Developers: Handheld Games (GBC); Blue Shift (PS)
- Publisher: THQ
- Platforms: Game Boy Color, PlayStation
- Release: Game Boy Color: NA: November 30, 2000; EU: December 8, 2000; PlayStation: NA: March 21, 2001; EU: April 6, 2001
- Genre: Sports
- Modes: Single-player, multiplayer

MTV Sports: T.J. Lavin's Ultimate BMX is a sports video game published by THQ for Game Boy Color in 2000, and for PlayStation in 2001. It features BMX rider T.J. Lavin on the cover.

== Reception ==
Reception

Aggregate scores
Aggregator	Score	
Aggregator	GBC	PS
GameRankings	61%	50%
Metacritic	N/A	47/100

Review scores
Publication	Score	
Publication	GBC	PS
AllGame	N/A	2.5/5
Consoles +	N/A	70%
Game Informer	7/10	N/A
GameSpot	N/A	2.7/10
GameZone	N/A	6.8/10
IGN	3/10	4.5/10
Official U.S. PlayStation Magazine	N/A	2/5

The PlayStation version received "generally unfavorable reviews" according to the review aggregation website Metacritic.
