= Warhammer 40,000: Kill Team =

2011 video game

- Developer: THQ Digital Studios UK
- Publisher: THQ
- Director: Richard Badger
- Programmer: Mat Draper
- Artists: Richard Thomas; Stuart Jennett
- Series: Warhammer 40,000
- Platforms: PlayStation 3 Xbox 360; Microsoft Windows
- Release: Xbox 360; July 13, 2011; PlayStation 3: NA: August 2, 2011; EU: August 10, 2011; Windows; May 22, 2014
- Genre: Shooter
- Modes: Single-player, multiplayer

Warhammer 40,000: Kill Team is a top-down shooter game with twin-stick control, set in the Warhammer 40,000 future fantasy universe. Players play as Space Marines attempting to halt an Ork invasion spaceship, facing orks and, later, Tyranids. Four Space Marine classes are playable Sternguard Veteran, Techmarine, Vanguard Veteran and Librarian. The first two focusing on Shooting the later two on melee. The game supports single player and same screen multiplayer modes.

The game included a bonus weapon for the use in multiplayer mode in the Warhammer 40,000: Space Marine, obtained by completing a level.

The game was developed and released by THQ for the Xbox 360 in July 2011 and for the PlayStation 3 in August 2011. A Microsoft Windows port was developed by UK based company D3T Ltd and released in May 2014.

== Reception ==
Reception

Aggregate score
Aggregator	Score	
Aggregator	PS3	Xbox 360
Metacritic	65/100	67/100

Review scores
Publication	Score	
Publication	PS3	Xbox 360
Destructoid	N/A	6/10
Eurogamer	8/10	8/10
GamePro	N/A	3/5
GameSpot	6/10	6/10
GamesRadar+	N/A	3.5/5
GameZone	7/10	N/A
IGN	6.5/10	6.5/10
Joystiq	N/A	3.5/5
PlayStation Official Magazine – UK	7/10	N/A
Official Xbox Magazine (US)	N/A	7.5/10
Metro	N/A	5/10

The PlayStation 3 and Xbox 360 versions received "mixed or average reviews" according to the review aggregation website Metacritic.

James Stephanie Sterling of Destructoid called the Xbox 360 version a "decent little shooter for fans of the franchise", and noted that the game was not designed for single-player mode, while criticizing the lack of online multiplayer. GameSpot's Carolyn Petit praised the title's mindless fun and compelling environment while taking issue with the shallow gameplay, local-only co-op, cheap deaths, and poor checkpoint placement. Nathan Grayson of GamesRadar+ liked the Xbox 360 version's quick, violent twin-stick combat, unique classes, and customization but disliked the repetitive gameplay, short runtime, and pace-breaking tutorialization. Arthur Gies of IGN wrote, "Arcade shooters shouldn't be boring, and they shouldn't be needy and pushy, and Kill Team is often all of the above."
