= The Ren & Stimpy Show: Time Warp =

1994 video game

- North American cover art
- Developer: Sculptured Software
- Publisher: THQ
- Director: Jeff Peters
- Series: The Ren & Stimpy Show
- Platform: Super Nintendo Entertainment System
- Release: November 1994
- Genre: Beat 'em up
- Modes: Single-player, multiplayer

The Ren & Stimpy Show: Time Warp is a beat 'em up video game developed by Sculptured Software and published by THQ for the Super Nintendo Entertainment System. An adaptation of the Nickelodeon cartoon series The Ren & Stimpy Show, the plot involves the titular duo attempting to collect 47 million Gritty Kitty proofs of purchase in order to win a time machine from Muddy Mudskipper.

The game features ten levels based on episodes early episodes of the show and cooperative multiplayer. It was released in November 1994. It received an overall lukewarm response from critics.

== Gameplay ==
The Ren & Stimpy Show: Time Warp features ten stages. The game is a beat 'em up, consisting of basic attacks like Ren's slap and Stimpy's hairball attack. The game features some references to the show, such as "The Happy Happy Joy Joy Song".

== Development and release ==
Time Warp was developed by Sculptured Software with assistance from publisher THQ's Black Pearl Software division. Black Pearl was founded in 1992 by former Atari Corporation's executive Lawrence Siegel and was absorbed into THQ the following year. Siegel recalled that THQ president Jack Friedman licensed as many intellectual properties as possible for game tie-ins during that period, including The Ren & Stimpy Show. The game's director, Sculptured's Jeff Peters, stated that Time Warp was "a fun project" but wished there had been more time to work on it. Time Warp was released for the SNES in November 1994. It was the third game based on The Ren & Stimpy Show released within one year.

== Reception ==
Reception

Review scores
Publication	Score
Consoles +	89%
Computer and Video Games	88%
Game Players	47%
Hyper	69%
Next Generation	1/5
Official Nintendo Magazine	84/100
Player One	90%
Super Play	51%
Total!	59%
Electronic Games	B+
Games World	78/100
Power Unlimited	80%
Super Gamer	80%
VideoGames	8/10

The Ren & Stimpy Show: Time Warp garnered average reviews from critics. The reviewers of Electronic Gaming Monthly praised the game's animations and various attacks, but stated that the controls "could be tweaked up a little more". Next Generation reviewed the game, rating it one star out of five, and stated that "When Nickelodeon fired creator John Kricfalusi, the heart and soul were sucked out of the pair. This game puts the final nail in the coffin."
