= Mohawk & Headphone Jack =

1996 video game

- Developer: Solid Software
- Publishers: NA: Black Pearl Software; EU: THQ
- Platform: Super NES
- Release: NA: August 1996; EU: March 27, 1997
- Genre: 2D action platformer
- Modes: Single-player, multiplayer

Mohawk & Headphone Jack (alternately written as Mo Hawk & Headphone Jack) is a 1996 2D rotational game released for the Super Nintendo Entertainment System.

The game was developed by American studio Solid Software, published by THQ and distributed by Electro Source. It was programmed by industry veteran D. Scott Williamson. The game spins around and around wildly in a circle, also changing the rotation of the map, and making it difficult to continue in the right direction. Rock music plays in the background as one or two players attempt to negotiate a treacherous series of platforms throughout the game's 14 levels. The game's likeness was based on Sonic the Hedgehog.

== Gameplay ==
Gameplay screenshot

The aim of each level is to collect enough CDs in order to open the exit to the next level. When the required number has been reached, the CD number in the bottom left-hand corner sounds an alert and begins flashing. At this point, the exit appears on the map as a flashing X (not to be confused with the player's current location). There are different coloured CDs worth different numbers of points, as well as large CDs that unlock different audio tracks (the final one being "Elephant Funk"). Every second level ends with a boss, and leads to a different world upon completion.

Mohawk's health is represented by yellow triangles; each time he is hit by an enemy, the number goes down (maximum of five). However, spikes bring instant death. He can also collect floating balls (maximum of three) which allow him to explode, killing all enemies on screen. Mohawk can become a variety of forms, including wheelie, springs, angel and mer-hawk.

== Reception ==
Reception

Review scores
Publication	Score
Game Informer	5/10
Game Players	71%
GameFan	73/100, 40/100, 60/100
HobbyConsolas	79/100
Next Generation	3/5
Superjuegos	68/100
Super Play	57%
Total!	(UK) 75/100, (DE) 3+
Nintendo Acción	70/100
Nintendo Magazine System	94/100
Super Power	74%
VideoGames	7/10

Mohawk & Headphone Jack received average reviews. Nintendo Power highlighted the unique gameplay and large levels, but considered the uneven graphical quality to be a negative. GamePro's Captain Squideo found the gameplay unique, but warned players that the game's fast-moving rotating screen is enough to cause nausea. Next Generation praised the well-designed map screen, but felt the game was too focused on navigation, citing a lack of tough enemies and being populated by only a few easy-to-kill enemies, while also ridiculing the character design.
