= Hot Wheels: Track Attack =

2010 video game

- North American Wii cover art featuring Twin Mill III and Bone Shaker
- Developer: Firebrand Games
- Publisher: THQ
- Platforms: Nintendo DS, Wii
- Release: NA: November 23, 2010; AU: November 25, 2010; EU: November 26, 2010
- Genre: Racing
- Modes: Single-player, multiplayer

Hot Wheels: Track Attack is an arcade-style racing video game, developed by Firebrand Games, and published by THQ. It was released in 2010 for Wii and Nintendo DS.

== Gameplay ==
The gameplay of Hot Wheels Track Attack revolves around the player racing a Hot Wheels car in a variety of events in order to unlock new cars, tracks and events. Players start with a small section of cars to race with and a limited number of events to compete in, but as players progress through the game, and earn medals for completing events, they unlock new cars, tracks, and events. Every race track in the game has blue tokens scattered throughout it, players collect these tokens by driving over them and can use them to buy additional upgrades for their cars. The in-game race tracks are filled with elements, such as ramps, loops, and obstacles that are made to resemble actual Hot Wheels toys.

== Reception ==
GamingXP gave the game a positive score, while Cubed3 gave the game a mixed score.
