= Attack of the Killer Tomatoes (1991 video game) =

- Developers: Imagineering; Equilibrium (GB)
- Publishers: Toy Headquarters; Altron
- Programmers: Rob Harris; Dan Filner (GB)
- Artists: Frank Lam; Rick Incrocci (GB)
- Composers: Mark Van Hecke (NES); Amy Dyson (GB)
- Platforms: Nintendo Entertainment System, Game Boy
- Release: NES: EU: 1991; NA: January 1992; Game Boy: EU: 1992; NA: January 1992; JP: March 19, 1993
- Genre: Platform
- Mode: Single-player

Attack of the Killer Tomatoes is a 2D platform game developed by Imagineering and released in 1991 for the NES. A Game Boy version was released in 1992 and although it uses the same cover as the original NES game, it is not a port of that version. The Game Boy version was developed by Equilibrium and published by THQ in Europe and the US. It was also released in Japan, where it was published by Altron in 1993.

The game is based on the children's cartoon Attack of the Killer Tomatoes: The Animated Series, which itself was based on the movie franchise Attack of the Killer Tomatoes.

== Gameplay ==
The game's protagonist is Chad Finletter, a young boy who is on a quest to stop the evil scientist Dr. Putrid T. Gangreen from unleashing his Doomsday Tomato. During his journey he must fight through legions of mutant tomatoes, although this is a feat he will take on alone as the citizens of San Zucchini are too afraid of the mutant tomatoes to aid him.

Much like other platform games of its time, the main method of killing the enemies is to jump on them, in this case squashing them, or breaking them into smaller tomato enemies. There are several bosses to take on including Zoltan, Beefstake, Mummato, Fang, Ketchuck and Tomacho.
