= Bob the Builder: Bob's Castle Adventure =

2003 video game

Bob the Builder: Bob's Castle Adventure is a 2003 video game based on the television series Bob the Builder. It was developed by Absolute Studios and released by THQ. The game follows Bob as he visits a castle while completing various activities.
