= Brunswick Circuit Pro Bowling 2 =

2000 video game

- North American box art
- Developer: Adrenalin Entertainment
- Publisher: THQ
- Series: Brunswick Circuit Pro Bowling
- Platform: PlayStation
- Release: NA: February 10, 2000; EU: March 2000
- Genre: Ten pin bowling
- Modes: Single player, multiplayer

Brunswick Circuit Pro Bowling 2 is a ten-pin bowling game released for PlayStation in 2000. It is the sequel to Brunswick Circuit Pro Bowling. It featured more characters (now including female characters), an easier throw system and many others.

== Reception ==
Reception

Aggregate score
Aggregator	Score
GameRankings	72%

Review scores
Publication	Score
AllGame	4/5
GamePro	3/5
GameSpot	7.1/10
IGN	8/10
PlayStation Official Magazine – Australia	4/10
PlayStation Official Magazine – UK	3/10
Official U.S. PlayStation Magazine	4/5
Play	44%

The game received above-average reviews according to the review aggregation website GameRankings.
