= Brunswick Circuit Pro Bowling =

1998 video game

- Developers: Adrenalin Entertainment (PC, PS), Point of View (N64)
- Publisher: THQ
- Platforms: Nintendo 64, PlayStation, Microsoft Windows
- Release: NA: September 29, 1998 (PC, PS); PAL: November 1998 (PS); Nintendo 64: NA: December 22, 1999
- Genre: Ten pin bowling
- Modes: Single player, multiplayer

Brunswick Circuit Pro Bowling is a sports video game released for Microsoft Windows and PlayStation in 1998 and the Nintendo 64 in 1999.

== Gameplay ==
These are the following game modes:

- Exhibition
- Skins
- Tournament
- Career
- Practice
- Cosmic

There are different lane conditions and different balls that react differently (the actual bowling balls, however, were all reactive, though several balls in the game are depicted as straight balls) as well as a physics engine that simulates real-life bowling physics.

The game includes a create-your-own-bowler feature. There are also Brunswick Pro Staff members such as:

- Mike Aulby
- Chris Barnes
- Parker Bohn III
- Steve Jaros
- Johnny Petraglia
- Ricky Ward
- Walter Ray Williams Jr.
- Mark Roth
- Randy Pedersen
- Mike Miller

== Development ==
The N64 version of the game was showcased at E3 1999.

== Reception ==
Reception

Aggregate score
Aggregator	Score
GameRankings	PC: 66% PS: 78%

Review scores
Publication	Score
AllGame	N64: 2/5; PC: 4.5/5
Computer Games Strategy Plus	PC: 3/5
Computer Gaming World	PC: 4/5
EP Daily	PS: 6/10
Game Informer	N64: 5.25/10; PS: 7.25/10
GameFan	N64: 183/200
GamePro	PS: 4/5 (Note: GamePro gave the PlayStation version 3.5/5 for graphics, 2.5/5 for sound, 4.5/5 for control, and 4/5 for overall fun factor.)
GameSpot	PC & PS: 7.4/10
Hyper	PC: 60/100
IGN	N64: 7.3/10; PC: 6.8/10; PS: 9/10
Next Generation	PS: 4/5
Nintendo Power	N64: 7.3/10
Official U.S. PlayStation Magazine	PS: 3.5/5
PC Gamer (US)	PC: 89%
PC Zone	PC: 58%
Play	PS: 62%
N64 Gamer	N64: 14%
Playstation Plus	PS: 45%

The PlayStation version received favorable reviews, while the PC version received average reviews, according to the review aggregation website GameRankings. Brunswick Circuit Pro Bowling's biggest supporters called the game addictive and the most accurate Bowling simulation ever. More lukewarm reviewers, written by critics uninterested in bowling, suggested only hardcore fans of the sport may enjoy the game. Although acknowledging how true the simulation was to Bowling, Play journalist Tom Sargent and Game Informer's Jay Fitzloff found that to be a detriment given how lame the real-life experience is.

Jules Grant of The Electric Playground wrote that while there were different difficulty levels, there was no explanation of game rules and ball physics for those new to Bowling. Finding Bowling "one of the least interesting sports in existence", N64 Gamer journalists Arthur Adam and Narayan felt the simulation failed to provide anything worthwhile for even devotees of the sport, suggesting the only thing that "may excite a few nerds" was the incorporation of real-life players.

A common highlight was the game's realistic simulation of the sport, particularly with the physics. PC Gamer critic Joel Durham Jr. noted that the complexity of the pin movements led to varying, unexpected results: "Once in a while you’ll get lucky and a downed pin will roll into that last remaining pin for a strike; other times, you'll think you nailed the pocket but wind up with a split."

Positive comments were made on the features, such as the high amount of them. Durham Jr. and AllGame's Michael L. House claimed that the different oil patterns and gameplay modes, such as practice, incentivized players to improve their skills. Wrote Durham Jr., "you'll be yearning to raise your average just a little bit, or trying to nail those three strikes you need in the tenth to break 200". GameSpot's Jeff Gerstmann praised the video clips about the bowlers, calling them "the most hilarious gaming moments in recent memory", and recommended even non-Bowling fans to buy the game just to see them. Game Informer enjoyed the replay option unusual in other games, and the Cosmic Bowling feature "because it's just too gaudy not to like". IGN's Tal Blevins also loved Cosmic Bowling, calling it one of the game's best modes.

Some reviewers generally found the presentation unspectacular. Reviews of the PC version from Jonah Falcon of Computer Games Strategy Plus and Scott A. May of Computer Gaming World found the graphics to take too little advantage of the 3D acceleration hardware. Blevins was repulsed by the still background crowd and little amount of sound effects, suggesting commentary audio should've been incorporated to spice up the experience. Game Informer also disliked the lack of commentary, was annoyed by the repetitive crowd sound effects, found the player character animations limited, and noted there is "little happening onscreen, yet somehow the graphics are still choppy". Adam condemned the graphics as blurry and plain, specifically criticizing the cardboard-cutout audience, the "utter bollocks" design of the bowlers, and puking at the neon-colored Cosmic Bowling alley. Grant and GamePro's Air Hendrix, although just as lukewarm, opined it looked and sounded the best a Bowling simulation could.

Falcon and Grant targeted the player characters. Grant disliked the limited options of bowler customization, particularly when it came to faces, clothing colors, and the absence of female characters. Falcon was outraged by the fact that there were no females, given that "bowling is one sport in which women are truly on par with the men, and have mixed pairs (like tennis and golf)". Additionally, he called out their "creepy" faces as well as the inability to vary body types, thus making the characters too similar to each other.

However, the visuals and sound were not without compliment, the player character animations a common highlight. Blevins applauded the soundtrack, particularly its variety of styles, which "ranges from funky fuzz guitar jams that remind me of Interstate '76 to AC/DC inspired heavy-metal licks". GameSpot's Jeff Gerstmann praised the use of several camera angles and "surprisingly good" music, and Cam Shea noted the ball and pin reflections and "spot on" sound effects.

Criticism was targeted toward the simple controls and setup. Smith and AllGame critic Anthony Baize argued the gameplay amounted to nothing more than pressing a single button frequently. PC Zone's Craig Vaughan criticized the two meters' "sweet spots", which made the challenge less skill-based. Grant, May, Hendrix and Durham Jr., on the other hand, claimed that, despite the simple controls and setup, the experience was made complex and "smooth" by aspects such as realistic and unpredictable pin physics, differing levels of ball responses to the controls, and changing oil patterns between bowling alleys.

== Brunswick Circuit Pro Bowling 2 ==
A sequel, Brunswick Circuit Pro Bowling 2, was only released for the PlayStation. It featured more characters (now including female characters), an easier throw system and many others.

== See also ==
- Brunswick Pro Bowling
