= Warhammer 40,000: Squad Command =

2007 video game

- Developer: Ubisoft RedLynx
- Publisher: THQ
- Producer: Miika Tams
- Designer: Leo Kihlman
- Programmer: Sebastian Aaltonen
- Artists: Antti Ilvessuo; Ville Anttonen
- Composer: Jarno Sarkula
- Series: Warhammer 40,000
- Platforms: PlayStation Portable, Nintendo DS
- Release: PSP: NA: November 12, 2007; EU: November 23, 2007; AU: November 29, 2007; DS: AU: December 6, 2007; EU: December 7, 2007; NA: December 17, 2007
- Genre: Turn-based tactics
- Modes: Single-player, Multiplayer

Warhammer 40,000: Squad Command is a turn-based tactics game set in the Warhammer 40,000 universe, released in 2007 for the PlayStation Portable and Nintendo DS. It was developed by Ubisoft RedLynx. The game features three Space Marine Chapters pitted against three Legions of Chaos (two and two for the DS) battling it out on the planet of Ruhr III. The game features units from the tabletop wargame.

== Gameplay ==
=== Single player ===
The single-player campaign follows the Imperium's Ultramarines over the course of 15 missions as they fend off an incursion by the Word Bearers Legion of Chaos marines on the planet Ruhr III.

=== Multiplayer ===
The multiplayer function can support up to eight players on local wireless connection or globally via Wi-Fi. There are nine different maps and players choose between three Space Marine chapters or three Chaos Legions to side with and battle against.

The DS version has a versus download play option, featuring four different chapters to choose from.

=== Features ===
Squad Command uses a turn-based gameplay system to mimic the play of the tabletop wargame. It features destructible 3D environments and over 20 weapons.

Squad Command uses Hit Points (HP) and Action Points (AP). Hit Points are used to calculate damage to a unit. When a unit's HP is reduced to zero they are removed from the battle as a casualty. Action Points represent the time a unit has to act in a round, and are expended when the unit moves or uses a weapon. Movement uses up varying amounts of AP depending on the distance moved, whereas weapons have a minimum amount allowable. The player can use more APs to aim a shot to increase accuracy. This is depicted by a band of fluctuating color, which tightens and darkens as more APs are spent. Terrain is destructible, allowing for sufficiently powerful weapons to destroy an object and simultaneously damage enemies taking cover behind it.

If a unit ends its turn with enough AP to fire their weapon they enter "Overwatch" mode during the enemy's turn. In Overwatch the first enemy unit that enters the Overwatch unit's line-of-sight is fired upon.

Some heavy weapons lower the amount of AP a unit may use in a turn, to simulate their weight and complexity.

== Reception ==
Reception

Aggregate score
Aggregator	Score	
Aggregator	DS	PSP
Metacritic	57/100	67/100

Review scores
Publication	Score	
Publication	DS	PSP
1Up.com	C+	B−
Eurogamer	7/10	7/10
Game Informer	N/A	7.5/10
GamePro	N/A	4/5
GameSpot	4.5/10	6.5/10
GameSpy	N/A	3/5
GameZone	5.8/10	N/A
Hardcore Gamer	1.25/5	N/A
IGN	4.5/10	5.4/10
Nintendo Power	8/10	N/A
PlayStation Official Magazine – UK	N/A	6/10
Pocket Gamer	N/A	3.5/5

The game received "mixed or average reviews" on both platforms according to the review aggregation website Metacritic. Eurogamer said of the PSP version: "It could and should achieve so much more - but frankly it achieves enough by making a specialist subject matter and a specialist genre as fun and accessible as it does."
