= Sky Sports Football Quiz =

2001 video game

- PlayStation cover
- Developer: Hothouse Creations
- Publisher: THQ
- Series: Sky Sports Football Quiz
- Platforms: PlayStation, Windows
- Release: EU: December 7, 2001
- Genre: Quiz

Sky Sports Football Quiz is a 2001 football quiz video game released for the PlayStation and Windows. The game was developed by Hothouse Creations and published by THQ. It is the first game in the Sky Sports Football Quiz series.

== Gameplay ==
Sky Sports Football Quiz is a quiz game that tests the player's knowledge of football divided into categories such as divisions, eras, stadiums, teams and tournaments. The game features then Sky Sports presenter Kirsty Gallacher in the role of quizmaster and has a database of over 4,500 questions as well as audio clips from Sky matches.

The player is able to choose between four modes: Penalty Shootout, where the player has to answer questions correctly to score goals against their opponent with five questions asked in either an league format or an single-elimination tournament. Man of the Match where the player/players take turns attacking and defending by answering questions as quickly as possible. In League Championship, the player selects a Premier League team to manage throughout an entire 38-match football season and each match consists of two questions. In Dream Team, the player forms a 11-player team in a 4–4–2 formation by answering questions on a given subject. The player earns money based on how fast they answer the question correctly.

League Championship and Dream Team are single-player games whereas Penalty Shootout and Man of the Match can be played as multiplayer games.

== Development ==
The game was developed by Hothouse Creations and was published by THQ for the PlayStation and Windows platforms in 2001.

== Reception ==
Dave Woods of PC Zone awarded the game a score of 78%, comparing it favourably to Championship Manager Quiz, arguing that it had "better graphics, easier questions and more game formats", but criticised it for the "cardinal sin of repeating questions". Official PlayStation Magazine described the title as "a treat for stat-happy football freaks", giving a score of 7/10. The Independent's David Gordon wrote that while the game might not have a broad appeal "its addictive gameplay plays other quiz games off the park." Writing for the Bournemouth Daily Echo, James Hanslip said the title would appeal just to devoted football enthusiasts and that it "gets too boring too quickly" despite the abundance of questions. Thorstein Carlskov of Svenska PC Games called it "an excellent product" but cautioned that it could get too difficult for Continental European players.
