= Danny Phantom: The Ultimate Enemy =

2005 video game

- North American box art
- Developer: Altron
- Publisher: THQ
- Director: Yoshihiro Tanaka
- Producer: Yoshihiro Tanaka
- Programmers: Yoshihiro Tanaka; Keisuke Ota; Mai Kiroba
- Artists: Daisuke Nakano; Hiroki Takahashi; Kenta Kuraishi; Wataru Akaogi; Tomoya Hiwatari
- Composer: Tomoyoshi Sato
- Series: Danny Phantom
- Platform: Game Boy Advance
- Release: NA: September 7, 2005; AU: April 27, 2006; EU: May 26, 2006
- Genre: Side-scroller
- Mode: Single-player

Danny Phantom: The Ultimate Enemy is a 2005 video game developed by Altron and published by THQ for the Game Boy Advance console. It is based on the episode "The Ultimate Enemy!" from the television series Danny Phantom and is the first video game for the series. Players play the role of Danny Phantom in his adventure to save Amity Park from a grim future where he has become evil.

== Story ==
Ten years in the future, Dan Phantom, Danny Phantom's evil older-self, confronts Valerie Gray and tears down Amity Park's ghost shield. In the Ghost Zone, the Observers take notice of the destruction and employ Clockwork to make sure Danny never becomes evil.

In the present, Danny is under pressure with the upcoming Career Aptitude Test (C.A.T.). After returning home from school, Danny defeats Box Lunch, the daughter of the Box Ghost and the Lunch Lady, but causes the Nasty Burger restaurant to explode. Danny then finds a medallion that Box Lunch leaves behind and Mr. Lancer's C.A.T. answer booklet. Back in Danny's room, Tucker examines the medallion, only for a fusion of Skulker and Technus to appear from the future. After using the defeated SkulkTech's medallion, Danny, Sam, and Tucker arrive in Clockwork's lair where he reveals himself and battles Danny. The trio then conclude that Danny's turning point to becoming evil is cheating on the C.A.T., and escape to the future before Clockwork can defeat Danny.

After traveling to the future, Danny battles Valerie until Sam and Tucker stop her. Dan Phantom intervenes, and Danny urges Sam and Tucker to take off the time medallions so they can quickly return to the present. Dan fuses the time medallion inside Danny's body, trapping him in the future, and throws him into the Ghost Zone. After finding Vlad's ghost portal, Vlad explains how Dan was created from using his Ghost Gauntlets on Danny. Vlad uses the gauntlets to remove the time medallion so he can return to the present.

Danny rushes to Nasty Burger to learn that his turning point to becoming evil is supposed to be his family and friends dying in an explosion there. Danny defeats Dan using his Ghostly Wail and traps him in the Fenton Thermos. Danny becomes weakened and unable to save his friends and family, but Clockwork appears and sets everything right again. At school the following day, Danny returns the test booklet to Lancer and agrees him to take the make-up exam the following week, preventing the tragic future.

== Reception ==
Reception

Aggregate score
Aggregator	Score
GameRankings	65.00%

Review scores
Publication	Score
GameZone	5.5/10
IGN	7.5/10

Danny Phantom: The Ultimate Enemy received mixed reviews upon release.
