= THQ =

American video game company

THQ Inc.
- Final logo, used from 2011 to 2013
- Type: Public
- Traded as: Nasdaq: THQI (1991–2012); OTC Pink: THQIQ (2012–2013)
- ISIN: US8724434035
- Industry: Video games
- Founded: April 1990; 36 years ago in Calabasas, California, US
- Founder: Jack Friedman
- Defunct: January 23, 2013; 13 years ago
- Fate: Chapter 11 bankruptcy
- Headquarters: Agoura Hills, California, US
- Area served: Worldwide
- Key people: Brian Farrell (chairman, CEO); Jason Rubin (president)
- Products: List: Bratz series; Company of Heroes series; Darksiders series; De Blob series; Destroy All Humans! series; MX vs. ATV series; Red Faction series; Saints Row series; SpongeBob SquarePants series; Warhammer 40,000 series; WWE series

THQ Inc. was an American video game company based in Agoura Hills, California. It was founded in April 1990 by Jack Friedman, originally in Calabasas, and became a public company the following year through a reverse merger takeover. Initially working in the toy business, it expanded into the video game business through several acquisitions before shifting its focus away from toys entirely. THQ continued its trend of acquiring companies throughout the 2000s.

The company published both internally created and externally licensed content in its product portfolio. THQ's internally created game series included Darksiders, De Blob, Destroy All Humans!, MX vs. ATV, Red Faction, and Saints Row, among others. The company also held exclusive, long-term licensing agreements with sports and entertainment content creators, such as Disney/Pixar, DreamWorks Animation, Nickelodeon, and WWE.

After years of financial struggles, stock value drop, and debt, THQ filed for Chapter 11 bankruptcy in December 2012 and commenced liquidation of its assets the following month. Several properties were auctioned to other companies, while the remaining staff were laid off. The "THQ" trademark was eventually acquired by developer Nordic Games (which had also acquired some of THQ's auctioned-off properties) in 2014 and assumed the name "THQ Nordic" in 2016, while continuing a variety of its franchises under said name.

== History ==
=== Background and foundation (1990–1999) ===
Former logo, used from 2000 to 2011

THQ Inc. was founded by LJN co-founder Jack Friedman in April 1990. "THQ" is an initialism for "Toy Headquarters". THQ acquired New Ventures, a division of Broderbund, in September 1990. In 1991, Trinity Acquisition Corp, a NASDAQ-listed special-purpose acquisition company (SPAC), agreed to acquire and merge with THQ in a reverse merger takeover. The deal was a stock swap valued at about $33 million, with THQ's shareholders owning 51.7% of the new entity. THQ's name was retained for the new company, its ticker symbol was changed to "THQI", and Friedman was named as its president.

In 1992, THQ and Nickelodeon decided to begin their relationship with their line of video games based on the television show The Ren & Stimpy Show for Nintendo game consoles.

THQ then acquired video game developer Black Pearl Software of Chicago in 1993. Following the acquisition, THQ would use the Black Pearl Software name for its Sega games, while the Malibu Games name would be used for the Nintendo games. In mid 1993, the company partnered with Malibu Comics to develop video games based on the Ultraforce, but never came to fruition, with one of these instead went to Sony Imagesoft.

THQ withdrew completely from the toy business in 1994 to focus solely on video game production. Around the same time, the company entered into a deal with Electronic Arts to license five titles for various consoles. Jack Friedman then left the company in 1995 to co-found the toy manufacturer Jakks Pacific.

At the Winter CES 1995, THQ signed an expanded deal with Electronic Arts to develop games for its 16-bit and 8-bit home consoles and handheld titles. From then on, the Black Pearl Software name would be used for 8-bit and 16-bit games, while THQ introduced the Kokopeli Digital Studios brand name for its 32-bit games.

In 1997, THQ was reincorporated as a Delaware Corporation, and in 1999 acquired San Jose video game developer Pacific Coast Power & Light. Also in 1997, the company expanded its deal with Nickelodeon to secure the video game licensing rights to the television series Rugrats.

In June 1998, the company entered into a ten-year 50/50 joint venture with Jakks Pacific (entitled THQ/Jakks Pacific LLC) to acquire the WWF (later WWE) video game license, previously held by Acclaim Entertainment. The deal, which would begin in October 1999, would correspond with two titles per year that THQ would handle product development and sales for.

In 1999, it signed a deal to publish Power Rangers video games. Also that year, it signed a licensing agreement with British game developer Codemasters to bring its titles to its handheld market. On February 17, 1999, THQ announced an agreement with Nickelodeon to publish video games from the Rugrats franchise.

=== Company growth and acquisitions (2000–2009) ===
In February 2000, THQ faced a class action lawsuit over a violation of federal security laws due to nondisclosure of material information. In September of the same year, the company expanded its internal product development capabilities with the acquisition of Volition located in Champaign, Illinois. Since then, THQ's internal studio system grew to eleven studios across the globe with distinct capabilities across all viable gaming platforms. Some of these studios, such as Relic Entertainment, Vigil Games, Blue Tongue Entertainment, Juice Games, Kaos Studios and Volition, worked on games for next generation consoles as well as PCs. THQ went on to acquire Vigil Games in 2006.

In 2000, THQ signed a deal with Fox Interactive to bring five of the titles to the Game Boy Color market, such as the Croc franchise. In April 2000, THQ announced an agreement with Warner Bros. Interactive Entertainment to publish video games based on the Scooby-Doo franchise. In October 2000, THQ acquired the rights to publish Tetris games in a licensing agreement with The Tetris Company. In October 2000, the company signed a deal with Nickelodeon to secure the console and handheld game rights to SpongeBob SquarePants and Rocket Power. In 2001, THQ obtained an extended agreement with Nickelodeon to produce video games based on its franchises, as well as computer game rights to Rugrats, SpongeBob SquarePants and Rocket Power and console and computer rights to other Nickelodeon shows like Jimmy Neutron: Boy Genius and The Wild Thornberrys. The agreement also covered games based on original intellectual properties, such as Tak and the Power of Juju, with the potential that THQ would release a game first, followed by an animated cartoon on Nickelodeon. In 2002, THQ signed a deal with Disney Interactive and Pixar to publish video games based on Pixar films. In 2004, THQ signed an agreement with MGA Entertainment to publish video games based on the Bratz fashion doll line. Also in 2004, THQ's deal with Nickelodeon was extended. In 2008, THQ announced a deal with DreamWorks Animation, replacing Activision as DreamWorks' video game licensing partner.

On May 10, 2007, THQ reported its highest annual sales figures and net profits ever for the fiscal year which ended on March 31. THQ's revenues reached over $1 billion. In March 2008, THQ announced the development of the world's first ever cheerleading game using the Wii Balance Board. Not long after, on November 3, 2008, the company closed five of its internal studios: Paradigm Entertainment, Mass Media Inc., Helixe, Locomotive Games, and Sandblast Games. In 2009, huge declines in sales prompted THQ to form a strategic plan to cut $220 million in annual costs by 2010 and invest in "fewer, better bets." Previously in 2007, THQ had a $68-million profit and $1 billion in revenue, which put it within range of its rival Activision. Many of its big-budget games sold poorly due to the Great Recession, despite having favorable reviews. Its hold on kids' games based on Nickelodeon television shows and Pixar movies slipped as kids turned to free online games playable on the Internet. With shares down 86% from the previous year and a market value of only $173 million, THQ had the possibility of being acquired by other companies. In March 2009, THQ spun off Heavy Iron Studios and Incinerator Studios as independent companies, and announced it was looking to sell Big Huge Games. Two months later in May 2009, THQ agreed to sell Big Huge Games to 38 Studios. In August 2009, THQ acquired Midway Studios San Diego for $200,000. The sale of the studio included all assets, except for the TNA Impact! video game. In December 2009, following many lawsuits between the three companies, THQ signed a standalone eight-year deal with the WWE, replacing the THQ/Jakks Pacific joint-venture deal.

=== Reorganization, financial struggles (2010–2012) ===
In February 2010, THQ announced that Juice Games and Rainbow Studios would be part of a reshuffle, and would now bear the title THQ Digital Warrington and THQ Digital Phoenix, respectively. The merger reportedly led to 60 job losses between THQ's US Rainbow studio and the UK Juice Game's studio.

In August 2010, THQ unveiled the uDraw GameTablet, a $70 accessory for Nintendo's Wii console that let gamers draw and play on their television screens. The white, 9-by-7-inch peripheral houses a Wii Remote on the left, with a doodle pad and tethered stylus on the right. THQ said more software for the uDraw would launch every couple of months.

In January 2011, THQ sold off its THQ Wireless division to a Swedish mobile company called 24MAS. On January 12, 2011, THQ unveiled its new logo. In March 2011, THQ, after its game Homefront was released, suffered a 26% stock drop. The large drop was speculated to be a result of Homefront's poor reception. On June 13, 2011, THQ announced the closure of Kaos Studios (the developer of Homefront) and THQ Digital Warrington (formerly Juice Games).

On July 27, 2011, THQ announced it was dropping the long-running Red Faction franchise. This was believed to be due to the poor reception over the latest game in the franchise, Red Faction: Armageddon. In the same year on August 9, 2011, THQ announced it would shift its development focus away from licensed kids and movie-based titles by closing down THQ Studio Australia and Blue Tongue in order to focus on "high-quality owned IP." The company also closed down THQ Digital Phoenix (formerly Rainbow Studios), thus dropping the MX vs. ATV franchise.

In November 2011, a uDraw for the PlayStation 3 and Xbox 360 was released. However, it was a commercial failure, and is considered one of the main causes of the financial woes that broke up the company.

In January 2012, THQ announced that it was exiting the licensed kids game business to focus on adult core gaming, but would continue to sell previously released titles. In February 2012, THQ also discontinued the uDraw GameTablet for the same reason.

In May 2012, THQ reported a net loss of $239.9 million for the fiscal year ending March 31, 2012. The loss was $100 million more than the previous fiscal year's loss of $136.1 million. That same month, Jason Rubin was appointed president of the company.

THQ filed a notice with the SEC on May 25 for a June 29 stockholder's meeting, where THQ asked stockholders to approve a reverse split of the company's common stock. On June 4, 2012, THQ announced a deal to turn over its license for UFC games to Electronic Arts (EA). In July 2012, THQ reported that its stockholders had approved the 1-for-10 reverse share split of its common stock to avert a delisting from the NASDAQ.

=== Bankruptcy and liquidation, THQ Nordic (2012–2013) ===
On November 13, 2012, THQ reported that it could not repay a $50 million loan from Wells Fargo, and were on the verge of Chapter 11 bankruptcy. With its stock price plummeting from early November values bordering on $3 down to $1.16 and with long-term liabilities of $250 million, THQ was forced to delay the release dates of its flagship titles Company of Heroes 2 and Metro: Last Light to March 2013. On November 29, 2012, THQ partnered with Humble Bundle to launch the Humble THQ Bundle in an effort to raise more money. By December 12, 2012, THQ sold nearly 800,000 bundles, raising around $5 million; THQ President Jason Rubin also made a purchase, spending $11,050 on the bundle. On December 19, 2012, just days after the Humble THQ bundle ended, THQ filed for Chapter 11 bankruptcy with the intention of selling THQ and all of its assets to Clearlake Capital with Centerview Partners handling the sale. Skip Paul, a former colleague of Jason Rubin, helped orchestrate the proposed stalking horse bid from Clearlake Capital Group.

However, the bid was ultimately denied by Judge Mary F. Walrath and creditors instead approved an individual auction of THQ's properties, which went ahead on January 22, 2013, one day prior to closure. At the auction, the Homefront franchise was acquired by Crytek (and was later acquired by Koch Media), Relic Entertainment and the video game rights to the Warhammer 40,000 series were sold to Sega, and the publishing rights to Turtle Rock Studios' Evolve and the WWE series were acquired by Take-Two Interactive. Ubisoft acquired THQ Montreal and the publishing rights to South Park: The Stick of Truth while Volition and the publishing rights to the Metro and Saints Row franchises were acquired by Koch Media. Vigil Games and THQ's publishing unit were still included in the Chapter 11 case, although all employees related to these entities were laid off. In a posting on Twitter on January 23, PlatinumGames' producer Atsushi Inaba expressed interest in acquiring the Darksiders franchise from THQ.

On February 26, THQ announced that it would sell off its remaining properties – the Darksiders, Homeworld, Red Faction, and Destroy All Humans! franchises, as well as its licensed and original properties – in a court-approved auction which would be held from April 1 to 15, with the process completed by May. Around the same time, THQ shut down the servers to the 2012 remake of Nexuiz, which was developed by IllFonic. In June 2013, Interplay Entertainment acquired the rights to the Freespace franchise from THQ.

All of THQ's remaining franchises, including the remainder of its original IPs (aside from Homeworld, which was acquired by Gearbox Software, and Drawn to Life, acquired by 505 Games) and licensed software, were auctioned to Nordic Games for $4.9 million in April 2013. The Nickelodeon game license was acquired by Activision. This would later expire, with Nickelodeon licensing out its franchises through various smaller publishers, including Nordic.

Creditors initially said the proposed sale of THQ in the bankruptcy court benefited current THQ management, including Rubin. Presiding Judge Walwrath called these criticisms a "conspiracy theory" on record. Creditors ultimately released THQ management, including Rubin, of any malfeasance in the company's official plan of liquidation.

The liquidation of THQ also affected other studios; British developer Blitz Games Studios shut down in September 2013, citing financial difficulties. The company's CEO Philip Oliver said that the demise of THQ, who was a major client for the studio, was one of the major contributing factors to the closure.

On June 12, 2014, Nordic Games announced that it had acquired the THQ trademark, allowing the studio to publish games under the THQ name. In August 2016, the company was renamed THQ Nordic in an effort to better associate itself with the historic brand.

== Subsidiaries ==
=== Development ===
| Name | Location | Acquired/established | Divested | Fate |
|---|---|---|---|---|
| Black Pearl Software | Chicago | June 1993 | —N/a | Intent to dissolve stated in September 1997; in dissolution by November 2000 |
| Heliotrope Studios | Guilford, Connecticut | August 2, 1996 | May 1998 | Dissolved due to THQ's acquisition of GameFX |
| GameFX | Arlington, Massachusetts | May 1, 1998 | —N/a | In dissolution by November 2002 |
| Locomotive Games | Santa Clara, California | May 24, 1999 | November 3, 2008 | Renamed from Pacific Coast Power & Light in April 2005; closed by THQ |
| Heavy Iron Studios | Los Angeles | September 1999 | March 2009 | Spun off into an independent company |
| Genetic Anomalies | Lexington, Massachusetts | December 13, 1999 | —N/a | —N/a |
| Volition | Champaign, Illinois | August 31, 2000 | January 23, 2013 | Sold to Deep Silver as part of THQ's bankruptcy proceedings |
| Helixe | Burlington, Massachusetts | July 2000 | November 3, 2008 | Closed by THQ |
| Cedar Ridge Construction | Grass Valley, California | May 2001 | 2001 | Merged into Pacific Coast Power & Light |
| THQ Digital Studios Phoenix | Phoenix, Arizona | December 21, 2001 | August 9, 2011 | Renamed from Rainbow Studios in February 2010; closed by THQ |
| Sandblast Games | Kirkland, Washington | February 2002 | November 3, 2008 | Formerly named Cranky Pants Games; closed by THQ |
| Outrage Games | Ann Arbor, Michigan | March 2002 | 2003 | Closed by THQ |
| THQ Studio Australia | Brisbane | 2003 | August 9, 2011 | Closed by THQ |
| Relic Entertainment | Vancouver | April 2004 | January 23, 2013 | Sold to Sega as part of THQ's bankruptcy proceedings |
| Concrete Games | San Diego | 2004 | January 23, 2008 | Closed by THQ |
| Blue Tongue Entertainment | Melbourne | November 17, 2004 | August 9, 2011 | Closed by THQ |
| Kaos Studios | New York City | February 3, 2006 | June 13, 2011 | Closed by THQ |
| THQ Digital Studios Warrington | Warrington | March 6, 2006 | June 13, 2011 | Renamed from Juice Games in February 2010; closed by THQ |
| Vigil Games | Austin, Texas | March 17, 2006 | January 23, 2013 | Closed as part of THQ's bankruptcy proceedings |
| Incinerator Studios | Carlsbad, California | July 18, 2006 | March 2009 | Spun off into an independent company |
| Paradigm Entertainment | Dallas | July 25, 2006 | November 3, 2008 | Closed by THQ |
| Mass Media Games | Moorpark, California | February 2, 2007 | November 3, 2008 | Closed by THQ |
| Big Huge Games | Timonium, Maryland | January 18, 2008 | May 27, 2009 | Sold to 38 Studios |
| Universomo | Tampere | May 2007 | March 2, 2010 | Closed by THQ |
| THQ San Diego | San Diego | August 12, 2009 | June 4, 2012 | Formerly known as Midway San Diego; closed by THQ |
| THQ Montreal | Montreal | October 19, 2010 | January 23, 2013 | Sold to Ubisoft as part of THQ's bankruptcy proceedings |

=== Publishing ===
| Name | Location | Acquired/established | Divested | Fate |
|---|---|---|---|---|
| THQ Entertainment | Kaarst | December 2, 1998 | —N/a | Renamed from Rushware in December 2000 |
| THQ Wireless | —N/a | May 2001 | February 8, 2011 | Sold to 24MAS |
| ValuSoft | Waconia, Minnesota | July 1, 2002 | April 25, 2012 | Sold to Cosmi Corporation |
| XDG (External Development Group) | —N/a | March 2006 | —N/a | —N/a |
| Elephant Entertainment | Minneapolis | April 1, 2008 | —N/a | —N/a |

== See also ==
- List of THQ games
