= Joe Whyte =

American actor and artist

- Born: Joseph Walter White; April 18, 1961 (age 63); Los Angeles, California, U.S.
- Occupation(s): Actor, artist
- Years active: 1987–present
- Spouse: Kate Savage (m. 2005)

Joseph Walter Whyte (born April 18, 1961) is an American actor and artist.

== Career ==
Whyte started working at Walt Disney Animation Studios in 1995, and worked as a modeler and voiceover artist there until 2010. He is best known for voicing Chris Redfield in Resident Evil: The Remake, but has also had voices in many Disney animated films, including Tarzan, Home on the Range, Chicken Little, Meet the Robinsons and Prep and Landing, among others.

== Filmography ==
=== Film ===
Year	Title	Role	Notes
1987	Night Visitors	Tad Whitmore	
1989	Assault of the Party Nerds	T.K.	
1999	Tarzan	Jonathan (voice)	
1999	Tuesdays with Morrie	Acapella Singer #4	TV movie
2000	The Emperor's New Groove	Official (voice)	
2002	Help, I'm a Boy!	Olaf (voice)	English version
2004	Home on the Range	Vulture / Additional voices	
2005	Chicken Little	Acorn Mascot / Umpire / Rodriguez (voices)	
2006	Toot & Puddle: I'll Be Home for Christmas		
2007	Meet the Robinsons	Reporter (voice)	
2008	Bolt	Additional voices	
2009	The Princess and the Frog	Additional voices	
2012	Bed Bugs from Outer Space!	Newscaster	Short film
2015	Strange Magic		Uncredited
2015	Flash Gordon Classic	Hans Zarkov (voice)	
2017	Puppy!: A Hotel Transylvania Short	Tinkles (voice)	
2017	The Emoji Movie	Red Wagon (voice)	
2017	The Star	Scribe / Inn Keeper #2 (voices)	
2017	Olaf's Frozen Adventure	Additional voices	
2017	The Last Captain	Narrator (voice)	
2018	Hotel Transylvania 3: Summer Vacation	Tinkles (voice)	

=== Television ===
Year	Title	Role	Notes
1996	Quick Witz	Himself	
1998	Sports Night	Mountain Climber	Episode: "The Quality of Mercy at 29K"
1999	The Drew Carey Show	Barbershop Quartet Singer #3	Episode: "Drew's Reunion"
2002	General Hospital	Paul	Episode: "Episode #1.9947"
2003	Miss Match	Man	Episode: "The Price of Love"
2004	Rodney	Husband	Episode: "It's Up, It's Good"

=== Video games ===
Year	Title	Role
1999	Disney's Tarzan	Mungo
2001	SpongeBob SquarePants: SuperSponge	Mr. Krabs
2001	Tom Clancy's Ghost Recon	Additional voices
2001	SpongeBob SquarePants: Operation Krabby Patty	Mr. Krabs
2002	Treasure Planet: Battle at Procyon	Mr. Onyx
2002	Resident Evil	Chris Redfield / Richard Aiken
2002	The Sum of All Fears	Male team member
2002	SpongeBob SquarePants: Employee of the Month	Mermaid Man
2002	Red Faction II	Male voice
2002	Jimmy Neutron: Boy Genius	King Goobot / Yokian Annihilator / Yokian Enforcer
2003	SpongeBob SquarePants: Battle for Bikini Bottom	Mr. Krabs / Mermaid Man
2004	EverQuest II	Numerous characters
2004	The Lord of the Rings: The Battle for Middle-earth	Easterlings
2005	EverQuest II: Desert of Flames	Numerous characters
2005	Chicken Little	Rodriguez / Acorn Mascot / Umpire
2006	The Lord of the Rings: The Battle for Middle-earth II	Soldiers of Rhun / Easterlings
2006	The Lord of the Rings: The Battle for Middle-earth II: The Rise of the Witch-king	Soldiers of Rhun / Easterlings
2020	SpongeBob SquarePants: Battle for Bikini Bottom – Rehydrated	Mr. Krabs / Mermaid Man (archival recordings from the original game)

=== Production credits ===
Year	Title	Role	Notes
1980	America's Top 10	Gaffer	
1986	Celebrity Double Talk	Production assistant	
1988–1990	The $10,000 Pyramid	Production assistant	
1991	The $25,000 Pyramid	Production staff	2 episodes
1994	Sports on Tap	Production assistant	
1999	Tarzan	Assistant modeler	
2002	Treasure Planet	Modeler	
2004	Home on the Range	Additional layout artist	
2005	Chicken Little	CG modeler	
2007	Meet the Robinsons	CG modeler	
2008	Glago's Guest	Modeler	Short film
2008	Bolt	Modeler	
2009	The Princess and the Frog	Modeler	
2009	Prep & Landing	Modeler	
2010	Tangled	Modeler	
2015	Strange Magic	Senior pre-visualization artist	
2018	Mary Poppins Returns	Modeler	
