= SpongeBob SquarePants: Battle for Bikini Bottom =

2003 video game

- North American cover art
- Developers: Heavy Iron Studios; AWE Games (PC); Vicarious Visions (GBA)
- Publisher: THQ
- Director: Shiraz Akmal
- Producer: Kristian Davila
- Designer: Joel Goodsell
- Programmer: Jason Hoerner
- Artist: Joffery Black
- Composers: Jimmy Levine; Robert Crew; Alex Wilkinson
- Series: SpongeBob SquarePants
- Engine: RenderWare (Note: Home console adaptation only.)
- Platforms: Game Boy Advance; GameCube; PlayStation 2; Windows; Xbox
- Release: NA: October 29, 2003; EU: November 28, 2003
- Genres: Platform, action-adventure
- Mode: Single-player

SpongeBob SquarePants: Battle for Bikini Bottom is a 2003 platform game based on the Nickelodeon animated series SpongeBob SquarePants, developed by Heavy Iron Studios and published by THQ for the GameCube, PlayStation 2 and Xbox. Separate versions, developed by Vicarious Visions and AWE Games respectively, were released for the Game Boy Advance and Windows. While the versions released for consoles were 3D platform games, the Windows version of the game is a mini-game compilation, and the Game Boy Advance version is a 2D platformer.

All versions of the game feature an original storyline, in which the player attempts to defend Bikini Bottom from an invasion of robots created by Plankton with a machine called the Duplicatotron 3000, playing as SpongeBob in all versions, as well as Patrick and Sandy in the console versions. The series' voice actors reprise their roles, with the exception of Clancy Brown as Mr. Krabs and Ernest Borgnine as Mermaid Man, with both roles instead being voiced by Joe Whyte. The game was released on October 29, 2003, in North America and in Europe on November 28.

Battle for Bikini Bottom received mixed or average reviews according to Metacritic. Edge included the Game Boy Advance version on its list of top handheld video games of the 21st century. It was a commercial success. The game has gained a cult following and a large speedrunning community presence.

A remake of the home console version, titled SpongeBob SquarePants: Battle for Bikini Bottom – Rehydrated, was released on June 23, 2020. It was developed by Purple Lamp Studios and published by THQ Nordic for Nintendo Switch, PlayStation 4, Xbox One, and Microsoft Windows. It includes an all-new multiplayer mode.

== Gameplay ==
Patrick in Goo Lagoon. An enemy G-Love robot can be seen in the background.

=== Home console versions ===
The core gameplay of SpongeBob SquarePants: Battle for Bikini Bottom involves gathering collectibles in various areas around Bikini Bottom by crossing platforms and avoiding environmental hazards like spikes and flames. The player also faces the robots which have been attacking Bikini Bottom. Some areas require different characters to beat, as each character has unique abilities. The player can control SpongeBob, Patrick, and Sandy. Switching characters in console versions require the player to find a Bus Stop. Upon using it the current character will switch to another, and using it again will switch back to the previous character, giving the player an option of two characters in each level. The default character throughout the game is SpongeBob; Sandy and Patrick do not share any levels as playable characters.

The game is a 3D platformer, requiring players to collect three main types of items. "Shiny Objects" are the game's main currency and can be used to pay tolls within game areas or to buy golden spatulas from Mr. Krabs. 'Golden Spatulas' are used to grant access to new areas. They are hidden throughout the game and can also be earned by completing tasks set by Squidward Tentacles and several other characters from the cartoon. Patrick's 'Socks' are also spread throughout the game and he will reward SpongeBob with a Golden Spatula in exchange for 10 of his socks. SpongeBob can also blow bubbles to form different shapes as special attacks/moves which can be used to advance further in the game, and can learn two new bubble moves from Bubble Buddy as the game progresses.

The game also utilises props for puzzle-solving. Trampolines help the player bounce to further ledges or platforms, buttons activate certain things throughout the game, and pressure pads are like buttons; however, they are only active while the player stands on the pressure pad, or there is another object placed on top. There are also character-specific abilities, including Sandy being able to swing from Texas hooks, SpongeBob being able to dive downward on a bungee hook, and Patrick's ability to pick up and throw melons called "Throw Fruits" and ice cubes called "Freeze Fruits". Though some areas can be navigated by any character, several sections can only be completed with a specific character, due to each one having unique abilities. SpongeBob can create a bubble helmet for head-butting enemies. Patrick can throw objects at buttons, robots, and pressure pads, and can throw "Freeze Fruits" into the bodies of Goo to freeze them. Finally, Sandy can glide over large gaps and destroy enemies and objects with her lasso.

=== Windows version ===
The Windows version features a series of mini-games and greatly differs from the console versions. In the game, SpongeBob's friends have been captured, and to free them, the player must play multiple games while collecting objects, including a game show-style trivia game where he must score 500 points to free the character from the cage. The player then takes control of the freed character in a game where the character locates more objects and battles the robots. Once all items are collected (money, magic shop items, Mermaid Man and Barnacle Boy's gadgets, SpongeBob's clothes, and various pieces of a machine), SpongeBob must return the items to their rightful owners.

=== Game Boy Advance version ===
The gameplay for the GBA version also differs from the other versions, as it is a 2D platformer. Rather than being non-linear, like the home console versions, the GBA version is level-based, although still visits most of the locations from the home console versions. Combat is much more limited, done through blowing bubbles onto enemies to turn robots off or back on; robots cannot be permanently destroyed, as replacements will appear through a portal in their starting positions, so enemies are used to solving platforming challenges. SpongeBob can ride a seahorse named "Mystery" on certain levels. Like other GBA games of its era, it uses a password system rather than saves.

== Plot ==
=== Home console versions ===
In Bikini Bottom, Plankton, the evil genius owner of the Chum Bucket, has built a new machine called the Duplicatotron 3000 to produce an army of robots, which he plans to use to steal the Krabby Patty Secret Formula. After creating them, he realizes that the switch on the Duplicatotron has accidentally been set to "Don't Obey". This leads the robots to seize control of the Chum Bucket out of Plankton and wreak havoc all over Bikini Bottom.

Meanwhile, SpongeBob and Patrick are playing with toy robots and horses. SpongeBob and Patrick are bored with the toys and wish they could play with real robots. Patrick uses his "magic wishing shell", believing it will make their wish come true the following morning. SpongeBob wakes to find that his house has been trashed by real robots. He receives a fax from Mr. Krabs, stating that he would give SpongeBob a Golden Spatula for every certain amount of Shiny Objects he collects for him. Shiny Objects must be collected to open or activate various tolls throughout the game. Outside, SpongeBob finds a disappointed Plankton, who falsely claims that the robots appeared suddenly and kicked him out. Plankton convinces SpongeBob to help him back into the Chum Bucket by embarking on a perilous quest to find golden spatulas and get rid of the robots, secretly intending to regain control of them once back inside.

Every area in the game has a unique set of missions to collect Golden Spatulas including a main overarching mission. SpongeBob travels to Jellyfish Fields, where he finds that Squidward has been stung by jellyfish. He manages to defeat King Jellyfish in a battle and obtains some of his jelly for Squidward's stings. SpongeBob also helps Mrs. Puff by locating stolen steering wheels in Downtown Bikini Bottom, stolen paintings in Rock Bottom, and missing students in the Kelp Forest. King Neptune calls SpongeBob and Patrick to the Poseidome to defeat Robot Sandy. He then goes to the Mermalair, where he fights Prawn, one of Mermaid Man's archenemies. He also helps Mermaidman and Barnacle Boy several other times throughout the game. Other quests include completing tasks for Larry the Lobster, his pet snail Gary, and the Flying Dutchman, in other areas like Goo Lagoon, Sand Mountain, and the Dutchman's Graveyard (where Sandy beats the Dutchman in a fight). Later, SpongeBob and Sandy save Squidward from Robot Patrick.

SpongeBob then falls asleep, allowing him to enter his friends' dream worlds to search for more golden spatulas. After Plankton, SpongeBob, and his friends finally gain access to the Chum Bucket, they discover the gigantic Robot SpongeBob and learn that Plankton was responsible for making the robots. Plankton sets the switch on the Duplicatotron to "Obey" (by placing an Obey sign over the don't obey setting), only to find out that Robot Plankton has been controlling the robots instead. Robot Plankton remarks to SpongeBob that he has interfered in his plans for the last time, simply stating “SpongeBob, meet SpongeBob”. SpongeBob attempts to disable Robot SpongeBob's brain from the inside while fending off frequent attacks from Robot Plankton. Upon succeeding, SpongeBob hopes that Plankton learned his "lesson". The Duplicatotron produces several more Robot Planktons, which begin arguing among themselves. The game ends after SpongeBob says that their work is not done, as there are still many robots running amok in the city.

The game then cuts to The Spongeball Arena, where the player rolls around in ball form in a large arena, while the credits roll on the screen. If the player collects all 100 golden spatulas, the game ends with a special surprise cutscene of all the game's characters singing the theme song.

=== Game Boy Advance and Windows versions ===
In the Windows game, SpongeBob and Patrick have a robot tea party with toy robots and SpongeBob wishes upon "the first falling clam" that robots "were people too". The next day, Bikini Bottom gets attacked by an army of robots. Patrick, Sandy, Gary, Squidward, and Mr. Krabs are captured by robots and locked inside cages. SpongeBob works his way through Bikini Bottom, the Flying Dutchman's Graveyard, the Kelp Forest, the Chum Bucket, and the Mermalair to locate his friends and various objects stolen by the robots. After all locations' games are played, a video is unlocked for the end of the game where SpongeBob and Patrick discover that Plankton was the one behind the robot invasion. Plankton admits that it was his fault and that the robots are not listening to him and the only way to control the robots is to set the switch to "obey" mode. Instead, Patrick fools around with the machine, accidentally pulling its obey switch off, which turns off the machine and deprograms the robots. After SpongeBob and Patrick leave, Plankton tries to tell them that he will be back with another plan.

The Game Boy Advance version is a 2D platform game with four chapters, each containing seven levels, all of which have their own unique puzzles. In the game, Mr. Krabs thinks the robot invasion is putting him out of business, so his assignment for SpongeBob is to fight the robots to get into the Chum Bucket to shut down Plankton's Duplicatron.

== Reception ==
Reception

Aggregate scores
Aggregator	Score
GameRankings	GBA: 64% GC: 74% PS2: 73% Xbox: 72%
Metacritic	GC: 71/100; PS2: 71/100; Xbox: 70/100

Review scores
Publication	Score
IGN	7.3/10
NGC Magazine	32/100
Official U.S. PlayStation Magazine	4.5/5
Official Xbox Magazine (US)	8/10
GMR	8/10

SpongeBob SquarePants: Battle for Bikini Bottom received "mixed or average" reviews from critics, according to review aggregation website Metacritic. IGN praised the sound, graphical style, and wrote of the gameplay, "While it's generic collect, jump, and kill mechanics, the variety and general SpongeBob zaniness keeps things fresh." GMR gave praise to the game's camera system as being solid and adjustable and noting how the comic humor holds the standard platforming elements in place concluding "Like Bob himself, this game holds its water and is, in fact, remarkably fun." More harshly, NGC Magazine's Rob Pegley lamented that the game "manages to combine the hideous touchy-feel values of the programme with a poor plot, badly designed levels, ... some awful collision detection ... awful music and poor humour."

The game won numerous awards, including Favorite Video Game at the 2004 Kids' Choice Awards, and entered the Player's Choice, Platinum Hits, and Greatest Hits for GameCube, Xbox, and PlayStation 2 respectively. During the 7th Annual Interactive Achievement Awards, the Academy of Interactive Arts & Sciences nominated Battle for Bikini Bottom for "Console Children's Game of the Year", which was ultimately given to Mario Party 5.

The Game Boy Advance version sold an estimated 710,000 copies, while the PlayStation 2 version sold an estimated 880,000. In 2006, Edge ranked the Game Boy Advance version at number 34 on its list of "The Century's Top 50 Handheld Games", while placing the PlayStation 2 version at number 67 on its list of "The Top 100 Games of the 21st Century", both lists arranged by the number of copies sold.

== Remake ==
Years after the game's releases, it has gained a cult following, positive reappraisal from contemporary critics, and a large speedrunning presence, with Heavy Iron Studios expressing interest in a remake or sequel, as well as requests from the game's fans for a remake. This was granted nearly two decades after the game's original release, with the announcement of Battle for Bikini Bottom – Rehydrated on June 5, 2019, ahead of E3 2019, albeit by a different developer from the original game. The remake was developed by Purple Lamp Studios and published by THQ Nordic, featuring a new multiplayer mode. The remake was released 1 year later on June 23, 2020.

== See also ==
- SpongeBob SquarePants: Revenge of the Flying Dutchman
- The SpongeBob SquarePants Movie (video game)
- SpongeBob's Truth or Square (video game)
- SpongeBob SquarePants: The Cosmic Shake
- SpongeBob SquarePants: Titans of the Tide
