= SpongeBob SquarePants video games =

Licensed video games based on the SpongeBob SquarePants television series

- Genres: Action, ticket redemption, adventure, action-adventure, city-building, puzzle, sports, third-person shooter, racing, party, rail shooter, Open-world, platform
- Developer: List of developers: Vicarious Visions; Engine Software; AWE Games; Climax Development; BigSky Interactive, Inc.; Sega; Heavy Iron Studios; WayForward Technologies; Aspyr; Tantalus Media; Blitz Games; Altron; Blitz Arcade; The Fizz Factor; Barking Lizards Technologies; Sarbakan; ImPulse Games; Firebrand Games; Sabarasa Inc.; Kung Fu Factory; Behaviour Interactive; Behaviour Santiago; Old Skull Games; Purple Lamp Studios; PHL Collective
- Publisher: List of publishers: Activision; THQ; Nickelodeon; THQ Nordic; PlayTHQ; ValuSoft; Focus Multimedia; Sega; Outright Games
- Platform: List of platforms: Game Boy Color; Microsoft Windows; PlayStation; Arcade; GameCube; PlayStation 2; Xbox; Game Boy Advance; InteracTV DVD; macOS; Mobile game; Nintendo DS; PlayStation Portable; Wii; Xbox 360; PlayStation 3; Nintendo 3DS; iOS; Android; Wii U; PlayStation Vita; Nintendo Switch; PlayStation 4; Xbox One; Stadia; tvOS; iPadOS; PlayStation 5; Xbox Series X/S; Nintendo Switch 2
- First release: Legend of the Lost Spatula; March 15, 2001
- Latest release: SpongeBob SquarePants: Party; Decmber 16th 2027

The SpongeBob SquarePants video game series is a collection of video games and arcade games based on the Nickelodeon animated television series SpongeBob SquarePants and its film series with the same name. The television series' massive rise in popularity during the 2000s led to a myriad of video games that span different genres. Several of these games are based on concepts from specific episodes, two of which are based on theatrical releases. Some of these titles had multiple different versions developed for a variety of home consoles and handheld consoles. Until 2013, the vast majority of titles were published by THQ. From 2013 to 2015, the license for most titles was handed to Activision. The license is currently held by THQ Nordic. Video games based on the series have often received mixed reviews from critics, yet many of these titles have performed well in sales.

SpongeBob-related characters have appeared in numerous other Nickelodeon crossover video games as well, featured alongside other Nicktoons.

== Releases ==
Year	Title	Platform(s)			Acquired label(s)
Year	Title	Console	Computer	Handheld	Acquired label(s)
2001	SpongeBob SquarePants: Legend of the Lost Spatula	—N/a	—N/a	Game Boy Color	—N/a
2001	SpongeBob SquarePants: Operation Krabby Patty	—N/a	Windows	—N/a	—N/a
2001	SpongeBob SquarePants: SuperSponge	PlayStation	—N/a	Game Boy Advance	PlayStation Greatest Hits
2002	SpongeBob SquarePants: Employee of the Month	—N/a	Windows	—N/a	—N/a
2002	SpongeBob SquarePants: Revenge of the Flying Dutchman	PlayStation 2; GameCube	—N/a	Game Boy Advance	—N/a
2003	SpongeBob SquarePants Collapse (Note: Released on March 4, 2003.)	—N/a	Windows	—N/a	—N/a
2003	SpongeBob SquarePants Darts (Note: Released on October 8, 2003.)	—N/a	Windows	Mobile	—N/a
2003	SpongeBob SquarePants: Battle for Bikini Bottom	PlayStation 2; Xbox; GameCube	Windows	Game Boy Advance	PlayStation 2 Greatest Hits; Xbox Platinum Family Hits; GameCube Player's Choice
2004	SpongeBob SquarePants and Friends in Freeze Frame Frenzy (Note: Titled Nicktoons: Freeze Frame Frenzy in the North American release.)	—N/a	—N/a	Game Boy Advance	—N/a
2004	SpongeBob SquarePants Movin' with friends (Note: Titled Nicktoons Movin' in the North American release.)	PlayStation 2	—N/a	—N/a	—N/a
2004	SpongeBob SquarePants Typing	—N/a	Windows; Classic Mac OS; Mac OS X	—N/a	—N/a
2004	SpongeBob SquarePants: Krusty Krab Adventures	InteracTV DVD	—N/a	—N/a	—N/a
2004	The SpongeBob SquarePants Movie	PlayStation 2; Xbox; GameCube	Windows; Mac OS X	Game Boy Advance; Mobile	PlayStation 2 Greatest Hits; Xbox Platinum Family Hits; GameCube Player's Choice
2004	SpongeBob SquarePants Bowling (Note: Released on November 1, 2004.)	—N/a	Windows	Mobile	—N/a
2005	SpongeBob SquarePants: 3D Obstacle Odyssey (Note: Released on January 12, 2005.)	—N/a	Windows	—N/a	—N/a
2005	SpongeBob SquarePants: Lights, Camera, Pants!	PlayStation 2; Xbox; GameCube	Windows	Game Boy Advance	PlayStation 2 Greatest Hits; Xbox Platinum Family Hits; GameCube Player's Choice
2005	SpongeBob SquarePants and Friends: Unite! (Note: Part of a series called Nicktoons Unite!) (Note: Titled Nicktoons Unite! in the North American release.)	PlayStation 2; GameCube	—N/a	Game Boy Advance; Nintendo DS	PlayStation 2 Greatest Hits
2005	SpongeBob SquarePants: The Yellow Avenger	—N/a	—N/a	Nintendo DS; PlayStation Portable	PlayStation Portable Greatest Hits, Essentials
2006	SpongeBob SquarePants: Creature from the Krusty Krab	PlayStation 2; GameCube; Wii	Windows	Game Boy Advance; Nintendo DS	PlayStation 2 Greatest Hits
2006	SpongeBob and Friends: Battle for Volcano Island (Note: Titled Nicktoons: Battle for Volcano Island in the North American release.)	PlayStation 2; GameCube	—N/a	Game Boy Advance; Nintendo DS	—N/a
2006	SpongeBob SquarePants Diner Dash (Note: Released on December 18, 2006.)	—N/a	Windows; macOS	Mobile	—N/a
2007	SpongeBob and Friends: Attack of the Toybots (Note: Titled Nicktoons: Attack of the Toybots in the North American release.)	PlayStation 2; Wii	—N/a	Game Boy Advance; Nintendo DS	—N/a
2007	SpongeBob SquarePants: Bikini Bottom Bowling (Note: Only playable as an arcade game.)	—N/a	—N/a	—N/a	—N/a
2007	SpongeBob SquarePants Obstacle Odyssey 2: Time Trouble	—N/a	Windows	—N/a	—N/a
2007	SpongeBob's Atlantis SquarePantis	PlayStation 2; Wii	—N/a	Game Boy Advance; Nintendo DS	—N/a
2007	SpongeBob SquarePants: Underpants Slam (Note: Only available on Xbox Live Arcade.)	Xbox 360	—N/a	—N/a	—N/a
2008	SpongeBob Atlantis SquareOff	—N/a	Windows	—N/a	—N/a
2008	SpongeBob SquarePants: The Game of Life (Note: Released on March 21, 2008.)	—N/a	Windows	—N/a	—N/a
2008	SpongeBob SquarePants: Monopoly (Note: Released on May 26, 2008)	—N/a	Windows	—N/a	—N/a
2008	SpongeBob SquarePants Featuring Nicktoons: Globs of Doom	PlayStation 2; Wii	—N/a	Nintendo DS	—N/a
2008	Drawn to Life: SpongeBob SquarePants Edition (Note: Spinoff of 2007's Drawn to Life.)	—N/a	—N/a	Nintendo DS	—N/a
2009	SpongeBob Dinner Dash/SpongeBob Dinner Dash lite (Note: SpongeBob Dinner Dash would become SpongeBob Dinner Dash Deluxe On May 6, 2011, and SpongeBob Dinner Dash lite would become SpongeBob Dinner Dash also on May 6, 2011.)	—N/a	—N/a	iOS	—N/a
2009	SpongeBob vs. The Big One: Beach Party Cook-Off	—N/a	—N/a	Nintendo DS	—N/a
2009	SpongeBob's Truth or Square	Xbox 360; Wii	—N/a	Nintendo DS; PlayStation Portable	PlayStation Portable Essentials
2009	SpongeBob's Truth or Square: SpongeBob SquarePants	—N/a	Windows	—N/a	—N/a
2010	SpongeBob's Boating Bash	Wii	—N/a	Nintendo DS	—N/a
2010	SpongeBob for iOS (Note: Released on September 19, 2010)	—N/a	—N/a	iOS	—N/a
2011	SpongeBob SquigglePants	Wii	—N/a	Nintendo 3DS	—N/a
2011	SpongeBob Dinner Dash Deluxe and SpongeBob Dinner Dash (Note: Released on May 6, 2011.)	—N/a	—N/a	iOS	—N/a
2011	SpongeBob's Surf & Skate Roadtrip	Xbox 360	—N/a	Nintendo DS	—N/a
2011	SpongeBob SquarePants: the Clam Prix	—N/a	—N/a	Leapster Explorer	—N/a
2013	SpongeBob Moves In!	—N/a	—N/a	iOS; Android	—N/a
2013	SpongeBob SquarePants: Plankton's Robotic Revenge	PlayStation 3; Xbox 360; Wii; Wii U	—N/a	Nintendo DS; Nintendo 3DS	—N/a
2015	SpongeBob: Sponge on the Run	—N/a	—N/a	iOS; Android	—N/a
2015	SpongeBob HeroPants	Xbox 360	—N/a	PlayStation Vita; Nintendo 3DS	—N/a
2020	SpongeBob Krusty Cook-Off (Note: Released on February 4, 2020 for mobile, December 11, 2020 for Windows, April 29, 2021 for Nintendo Switch, September 27, 2022 for Netflix, and July 2, 2025 for PlayStation 4, Xbox One, PlayStation 5 and Xbox Series X/S.) (Note: Known on Netflix as SpongeBob: Get Cooking)	PlayStation 4; Xbox One; Nintendo Switch; PlayStation 5; Xbox Series X/S	iOS; iPadOS; Android	Windows (Microsoft Store)	—N/a
2020	SpongeBob: Patty Pursuit (Note: Released on May 28, 2020 for Apple Arcade)	tvOS	macOS	iOS; iPadOS	—N/a
2020	SpongeBob SquarePants: Battle for Bikini Bottom – Rehydrated	PlayStation 4; Xbox One; Nintendo Switch; Stadia	Windows	iOS; iPadOS; Android	—N/a
2021	SpongeBob’s Idle Adventures	—N/a	—N/a	iOS; iPadOS; Android	—N/a
2022	SpongeBob SolitairePants (Note: Released on November 25, 2022 for Apple Arcade)	tvOS	macOS	iOS; iPadOS	—N/a
2023	SpongeBob SquarePants: The Cosmic Shake	PlayStation 4; Xbox One; Nintendo Switch; PlayStation 5; Xbox Series X/S	Windows	iOS; iPadOS; Android	—N/a
2023	SpongeBob Adventures: In a Jam (Note: Also known as SpongeBob Farming.)	—N/a	—N/a	Android; iOS	—N/a
2023	SpongeBob Simulator	Roblox; Xbox One; Xbox Series X and Series S; PlayStation 4; PlayStation 5	Windows	Android; iOS	—N/a
2024	SpongeBob: Bubble Pop F.U.N. (Note: Released on September 17, 2024 for Netflix) (Note: This app has been removed from Android and iOS on July 14, 2025.)	—N/a	—N/a	Android; iOS	—N/a
2024	SpongeBob SquarePants: The Patrick Star Game	PlayStation 4; Xbox One; Nintendo Switch; PlayStation 5; Xbox Series X/S	Windows	—N/a	—N/a
2025	SpongeBob SquarePants: Titans of the Tide	Nintendo Switch; Nintendo Switch 2; PlayStation 5; Xbox Series X/S	Windows	—N/a	—N/a
2025	SpongeBob: Patty Pursuit 2 (Note: Released on December 4, 2025 for Apple Arcade)	tvOS	macOS	iOS; iPadOS	—N/a
2027	Spongebob Squarepants Party	Nintendo Switch 2 With Instruction Booklet PlayStation 5 Xbox One PlayStation 4 Xbox series X/S			
Notes:

Other video games including SpongeBob SquarePants
Year	Title	Platform(s)			Acquired label(s)
Year	Title	Console	Computer	Handheld	Acquired label(s)
2000	Nicktoons Racing	PlayStation	Windows	Game Boy Color; Game Boy Advance	—N/a
2001	Nicktoons Nick Tunes	—N/a	Windows	—N/a	—N/a
2002	Nickelodeon Party Blast	Xbox; GameCube	Windows	—N/a	—N/a
2003	Nickelodeon Toon Twister 3-D	—N/a	Windows	—N/a	—N/a
2004	Nicktoons Basketball	—N/a	Windows	—N/a	—N/a
2004	Nicktoons: Freeze Frame Frenzy	—N/a	—N/a	Game Boy Advance	—N/a
2004	Nicktoons: Movin'	PlayStation 2	—N/a	—N/a	—N/a
2005	Nicktoons Unite!	PlayStation 2; GameCube	—N/a	Game Boy Advance; Nintendo DS	PlayStation 2 Greatest Hits
2006	Nicktoons Winners Cup Racing	—N/a	Windows	—N/a	—N/a
2006	Nicktoons: Battle for Volcano Island	PlayStation 2; GameCube	—N/a	Game Boy Advance; Nintendo DS	—N/a
2007	Nicktoons: Attack of the Toybots	PlayStation 2; Wii	—N/a	Game Boy Advance; Nintendo DS	—N/a
2008	Nicktoons: Android Invasion	—N/a	—N/a	LeapFrog Didj	—N/a
2009	Nicktoons Nitro (Note: Only playable as an arcade game.)	—N/a	—N/a	—N/a	—N/a
2011	Nicktoons MLB	Wii; Xbox 360	—N/a	Nintendo DS; Nintendo 3DS	—N/a
2018	Nickelodeon Kart Racers	PlayStation 4; Xbox One; Nintendo Switch	—N/a	—N/a	—N/a
2018	Super Brawl Universe (Note: Released on August 3, 2018 for Android and on iOS on March 12, 2019.)	—N/a	—N/a	iOS; Android	—N/a
2020	Nickelodeon Kart Racers 2: Grand Prix	PlayStation 4; Xbox One; Nintendo Switch	Windows	iOS; Android	—N/a
2021	Madden NFL 21	PlayStation 4; PlayStation 5; Xbox One; Xbox Series X/S; Stadia	Windows	iOS; iPadOS; Android	—N/a
2021	Nickelodeon All-Star Brawl	PlayStation 4; PlayStation 5; Xbox One; Xbox Series X/S; Nintendo Switch	Windows	—N/a	—N/a
2022	Hot Wheels Unleashed (Note: SpongeBob Racing Season DLC was available from January 20 to March 29, 2022)	PlayStation 4; PlayStation 5; Xbox One; Xbox Series X/S; Nintendo Switch	Windows	—N/a	—N/a
2022	Nickelodeon Extreme Tennis (Note: Released on January 21, 2022 for Apple Arcade. Ported to home consoles in 2026 as Nickelodeon Extreme Tennis Next!)	PlayStation 5; Xbox One; Xbox Series X/S; Nintendo Switch	Windows; macOS; tvOS	iOS; iPadOS	—N/a
2022	Nickverse	Roblox; Xbox One; Xbox Series X and Series S; PlayStation 4; PlayStation 5	macOS	iOS; Android	—N/a
2022	Minecraft x SpongeBob DLC	Minecraft; Nintendo Switch; Xbox One; Xbox Series X and Series S; PlayStation 4; PlayStation 5	Windows	iOS; Android	—N/a
2022	Nickelodeon Kart Racers 3: Slime Speedway	PlayStation 4; PlayStation 5; Xbox One; Xbox Series X/S; Nintendo Switch	Windows	—N/a	—N/a
2022	Fall Guys (Note: SpongeBob costumes were available on December 1, 2022 for a limited time.)	PlayStation 4; PlayStation 5; Xbox One; Xbox Series X/S; Nintendo Switch; Windows		—N/a	—N/a
2023	PowerWash Simulator (Note: "SpongeBob SquarePants Special Pack" DLC was released on June 29, 2023)	PlayStation 4; PlayStation 5; Xbox One; Xbox Series X/S; Nintendo Switch	Windows	—N/a	—N/a
2023	Nickelodeon All-Star Brawl 2	PlayStation 4; PlayStation 5; Xbox One; Xbox Series X/S; Nintendo Switch	Windows	—N/a	—N/a
2023	Toca Boca	—N/a	—N/a	iOS, Android	—N/a
2023	Survivor.io	—N/a	—N/a	iOS, Android	—N/a
2023	Stumble Guys	—N/a	Windows	iOS, Android	—N/a
2023	Brawlhalla	PlayStation 4; Xbox One; Nintendo Switch	Windows, Mac	iOS, Android	—N/a
2023	Oh Baby! Kart	—N/a	Windows, Mac	—N/a	—N/a
2023	Epic Roller Coasters	PlayStation 5	Windows, Mac	—N/a	—N/a
2024	Brawl Stars	—N/a	—N/a	iOS; iPadOS; Android	—N/a
2024	Just Dance 2025 Edition	PlayStation 5; Xbox Series X/S; Nintendo Switch	—N/a	—N/a	—N/a
2025	Sonic Racing: CrossWorlds (Note: "SpongeBob SquarePants Pack" DLC was released on November 19, 2025)	Nintendo Switch; Nintendo Switch 2; PlayStation 4; PlayStation 5; Xbox One; Xbox Series X/S	Windows	—N/a	—N/a
2025	Nicktoons & The Dice of Destiny	PlayStation 5; Xbox Series X/S; Nintendo Switch	—N/a	—N/a	—N/a
2025	Fortnite	Nintendo Switch; Nintendo Switch 2; PlayStation 4; PlayStation 5; Xbox One; Xbox Series X/S	Windows	iOS; iPadOS; Android	

== Reception ==
Aggregate review scores
Game	GameRankings	Metacritic
Legend of the Lost Spatula	60.60%	—
Operation Krabby Patty	—	—
SuperSponge	(PS1) 68% (GBA) 67.83%	—
Employee of the Month	—	—
Revenge of the Flying Dutchman	53–75%: (PS2) 53.20% (GC) 72.60% (GBA) 75.29%	40–71: (PS2) 40 (GC) 66 (GBA) 71
Battle for Bikini Bottom	63–74%: (GC) 74.17% (PS2) 73.30% (Xbox) 72.05% (GBA) 63.62%	(GC) 71 (PS2) 71 (Xbox) 70
Freeze Frame Frenzy	60.20%	53
Movin' with Friends	53.33%	—
The Movie	52–72%: (GBA) 52.67% (Mobile) 68% (Xbox) 70.46% (GC) 70.90% (PS2) 71.89% (PC) 72.50%	67–75: (PC) 67 (GC) 73 (Xbox) 74 (PS2) 75
Lights, Camera, Pants!	53–75%: (Xbox) 53.67% (GC) 59.75% (PS2) 61.46% (GBA) 71.67% (PC) 75%	(PS2) 59 (Xbox) 57 (PC) 68
Unite!	53–64%: (GBA) 53.33% (PS2) 55.58% (DS) 57.33% (GC) 64%	(PS2/DS) 53
The Yellow Avenger	(DS) 62.67% (PSP) 58.45%	(DS) 67 (PSP) 48
Creature from the Krusty Krab Nighty Nightmare	56–72%: (GC) 69% (PS2) 62.44% (Wii) 58.83% (GBA) 72.50% (DS) 56.33%	56–74: (DS) 56 (PS2) 56 (Wii) 57 (GC) 74
Battle for Volcano Island	55–69%: (PS2) 55.88% (DS) 57.60% (GBA) 65.40% (GC) 69%	(PS2/DS) 59 (GBA) 69
Attack of the Toybots	57–67%: (GBA) 57% (Wii) 57.33% (PS2) 64.75% (DS) 67%	(DS) 54 (Wii) 60
Atlantis SquarePantis	59–72%: (PS2) 59.75% (Wii) 62.25% (DS) 66.60% (GBA) 72%	(DS) 64
Underpants Slam	52.33%	55
Globs of Doom	(DS) 66.50% (Wii) 58.83% (PS2) 57.50%	(DS) 48 (Wii) 47 (PS2) 39.33
Drawn to Life	71.08%	68
The Big One: Beach Party Cook-Off	58.20%	—
Truth or Square	(360) 40% (Wii) 68%	(360) 40
Boating Bash	(DS) 43% (Wii) 46.50%	—
SquigglePants	(Wii) 64.18% (3DS) 68.29%	(Wii) 59 (3DS) 64
Surf & Skate Roadtrip	(360) 60%	(360) 60
Moves In!	—	(iOS) 50
Plankton's Robotic Revenge	—	(Wii U) 40
HeroPants	—	(360) 20 (PS Vita) 58
Battle for Bikini Bottom – Rehydrated	–	66–71: (PC) 69 (PS4) 68 (Xbox One) 71 (Switch) 66
The Cosmic Shake	–	68–73: (PC) 71 (PS4) 70 (Xbox One) 68 (Switch) 73

The SpongeBob SquarePants video game series received mixed reviews from critics. Although the video game based on the movie is the highest rated according to Metacritic, Battle for Bikini Bottom is considered by fans to be one of the best video games in the series.

Edge declared Operation Krabby Patty as the 29th game in their list of "The Top 100 PC Games of the 21st Century" in 2006.

HeroPants was nominated for the "Favorite Video Game Award" at the Nickelodeon Kids' Choice Awards in 2016, but lost to Just Dance 2016. Employee of the Month was nominated by the editors of Computer Gaming World for the "Adventure Game of the Year" award in 2003, but the award was given to Uplink: Hacker Elite.

Lights, Camera, Pants! was nominated for the Best Animated Video Game title at the 33rd Annie Awards in 2005, but lost to Ultimate Spider-Man. Creature from the Krusty Krab was nominated for the Best Animated Video Game at the 34th Annie Awards in 2006, but lost to Flushed Away. It also won the award for Favorite Video Game at the 2007 Kids' Choice Awards.

The highest rated spongebob game according to metacritic is Spongebob Titians of the tide, meanwhile the lowest rated is Spongebob SquarePants featuring nick toons: Globs of doom

=== Sales ===
The PlayStation version of SuperSponge sold 1.06 million copies, becoming one of the console's best-selling games. Battle for Bikini Bottom sold over 1.25 million copies. Both games were added to the PlayStation Greatest Hits by Sony, and the latter was added to the Xbox Platinum Family Hits and the GameCube Player's choice by Microsoft and Nintendo, respectively.

By 2006, SpongeBob SquarePants video game series sales totaled 1.5 million copies sold, with Operation Krabby Patty having an estimated sales total of 490,000 copies.

Edge also ranked Revenge of the Flying Dutchman, Battle of Bikini Bottom, and The SpongeBob SquarePants Movie at numbers 34, 31, and 25 respectively in their list "The Century's Top 50 Handheld Games," based on the number of copies sold. The Game Boy Advance versions of The SpongeBob SquarePants Movie, Battle for Bikini Bottom, and Revenge of the Flying Dutchman sold an estimated total of 780,000, 710,000, and 740,000 copies, respectively.

By 2007, the video game series totaled more than 20 million copies shipped worldwide, making it one of the best-selling video game franchises. By 2010, the series reached more than 29 million copies shipped worldwide.

SpongeBob Moves In! peaked at #6 at the App Store Official Charts of Top Paid iPhone Apps, and on #4 at the Top Paid iPad Apps in 2013.

In June 2020, The NPD Group released a ranking of the Top 10 best-selling SpongeBob games in the United States as of May 2020, with The SpongeBob SquarePants Movie being in the number 1 spot followed by Battle for Bikini Bottom and Revenge of the Flying Dutchman.

On August 13, 2020, Rehydrated had sold over 1 million copies. And as of May 19, 2021, it reached more than 2 million copies.
