= SpongeBob SquarePants Featuring Nicktoons: Globs of Doom =

2008 action-adventure video game

- North American Wii cover art
- Developers: Incinerator Studios (Wii, PlayStation 2); Natsume Co., Ltd. (Nintendo DS)
- Publisher: THQ (Note: Released under the Play THQ label)
- Director: Joel Goodman
- Designers: Brian McInerny; Joseph Mauke
- Programmers: Mike Weldon; Timothy Parker
- Artists: Jeff Garstecki; Terrence Keller; Moïse Breton; Eric Lin
- Composer: Todd Masten
- Series: Nicktoons Unite!; SpongeBob SquarePants
- Platforms: Nintendo DS, PlayStation 2, Wii
- Release: NA: October 20, 2008; AU: October 23, 2008; EU: October 24, 2008; KR: December 11, 2008 (Wii and DS)
- Genre: Action-adventure
- Modes: Single-player, multiplayer

SpongeBob SquarePants Featuring Nicktoons: Globs of Doom, also known as SpongeBob SquarePants: Globs of Doom, or Nicktoons: Globs of Doom, is a 2008 action-adventure video game, it is a sequel to the 2007 video game Nicktoons: Attack of the Toybots, and the fourth and final installment in the Nicktoons Unite! series. Characters from The Adventures of Jimmy Neutron, Boy Genius, Danny Phantom, SpongeBob SquarePants, Invader Zim, and Tak and the Power of Juju appear. The original developers of the previous games for consoles, Blue Tongue Entertainment, did not return to create this installment.

== Gameplay ==
SpongeBob SquarePants Featuring Nicktoons: Globs of Doom is an action-adventure platforming game in which players take control of Nicktoons characters. The game is split into 6 worlds: Bikini Bottom, Zim's Town, Amity Park, Retroville, Pupununu Village, and Outer Space. Players use special Mawgu enhanced weapons to battle enemies, each with their own unique features.

== Plot ==
SpongeBob and Squidward's usual walk to work is disrupted when huge orange asteroids start raining down on Bikini Bottom. A chunk of goo falls on Squidward, causing him to be brainwashed by an alien creature called a Morphoid. He chases SpongeBob and Patrick like a zombie until Jimmy Neutron intervenes and takes them to the Mawgu Lair on Volcano Island. There they meet Danny Phantom, Tak, and a newly formed Evil Syndicate composed of Technus, Beautiful Gorgeous, Tlaloc, and Plankton. Zim and Dib arrive, with Zim joining the heroes because he is "curious", and Dib joining the Syndicate to not be on Zim's side. They make a plan to stop the Morphoid invasion, and the Wise Old Crab arrives to inform them about some technology in the lair. Jimmy uses the technology to equip everyone with weapons fitting their personality.

The group teleports to Bikini Bottom to free Gary, Squidward, and Patrick from the goo, battle an army of Morphoids, and defeat Bubble Bass, who grows gigantic and brainwashed after eating a goo-covered Krabby Patty. After being defeated, Bubble Bass vomits a large amount of goo onto SpongeBob, which leads to him intermittently speaking in an evil voice after returning to the lair. The Wise Old Crab informs them that a giant robot-like spacecraft called the Vessel of Portentia is hidden in the Mawgu Lair, and requires four special components to power it up. They then warp to Zim's town, where GIR is playing with the first component of the vessel, becomes corrupted by the goo, and runs off. The group free Ms. Bitters, Gaz, and Professor Membrane, battle GIR at Zim's house to retrieve the component, and more goo falls onto SpongeBob. After returning to the lair, the group discover that the absorption of goo in SpongeBob's body has created a wavelength enabling the leader of the Morphoids to talk through him.

In Amity Park, the gang frees Dash, Tucker, and Jazz, fight a corrupted Ghost Dog at a power plant to retrieve the second vessel piece, and more goo flies onto SpongeBob. Back at the lair, SpongeBob tells everyone that he saw a vision of Globulous Maximus, the ruler of the Morphoids. At Retroville, the group free Carl, Cindy, and Sheen, fight Jimmy's girl-eating plant at the mall, and SpongeBob gets covered by even more goo. They retrieve the third piece of the Vessel, and SpongeBob states that Globulous Maximus is only a few light-years away from Earth, preparing to send more gigantic Morphoids to destroy it. Finally, they go to Pupununu Village, free Jibolba and Jeera, find the final component of the vessel, and SpongeBob gets covered in goo again. At the Mawgu Lair, the voice of Globulous informs SpongeBob that he plans to "become him" because he is sick of his life. The team insert the pieces of the Vessel of Portentia and blast off into space. They confront and defeat Globulous Maximus, who turns out to be a large asteroid with floating arms and eyes. The Evil Syndicate, deciding that they could use Globulous for their own evil schemes, hijack the Vessel of Portentia and eject the heroes from the ship. Globulous opens up to the heroes, saying that he does not want to be used for evil, and has only been attacking various planets because he was distasteful of his form due to being a result of the "Big Sneeze" that created the universe, and took out his anger on others. When the heroes plan on how they're going to defeat the Syndicate, Globulous then morphs into a huge, orange, and cycloptic version of SpongeBob.

Depending on the player's actions during the final battle, one of two endings will occur. The "bad" ending is a cutscene of the Syndicate trapping Globulous in a giant glass jar. This requires a second player taking control of the villains' robot and defeating the first player on an incomplete save file. In the "good" ending, achieved by beating the final boss, Globulous and the heroes manage to defeat the Vessel of Portentia on the moon, leaving the villains stranded in space. Globulous returns the heroes to Earth and says that he will right the wrongs in the universe by taking the moniker "SpongeGlob". The heroes bid SpongeGlob farewell as he blasts off into space. SpongeBob lets out a sneeze and the goo finally exits from his body.

== Development ==
The music of Globs of Doom was composed by Todd Masten. Masten noted that the story of the game had a "real 1950s sci-fi feel" and thus incorporated the theremin into many of the game's tracks. Masten based most of the game's music on the existing franchise music but took several liberties including the use of heavy techno instruments in the scenes of the characters leaving the world and heading into space. Masten worked to give each environment and boss encounter a unique feel to help "build suspense and tension". Masten worked 7/4 sections into the main theme to "mix things up a bit". The game's closing theme is a variation of the opening theme played with more modern instrumentation.

== Reception ==
Reception

Aggregate scores
Aggregator	Score
GameRankings	66.40% (DS); 58.83% (Wii); 57.50% (PS2)
Metacritic	47/100 (Wii)

Review scores
Publication	Score
GameZone	7/10 (Wii); 4.5/10 (PS2)
IGN	5.5/10 (Wii)

Globs of Doom received mixed to negative reviews from critics. Louis Bedigian of GameZone described the Wii version as "a button-masher for gamers under 12" and decided that "it won't rock anyone's world, but if you know a kid who loves these Nicktoons characters and enjoys simple, battle-filled games, Globs of Doom is one of SpongeBob's better adventures." Angelina Sandoval, also of GameZone, said that "Globs of Doom could have been that extraordinary kid's title and SpongeBob SquarePants game but it just falls short in almost every way. It's also not a very fun game despite the variety of characters and co-op gameplay. If your young gamer loves all of these characters I highly recommend a rental instead." Adam Ballard of IGN concluded that "Ultimately, it's a subpar SpongeBob game with Nicktoons tacked on for good measure. Suffice it to say that no amount of licensed characters can save this game from its monotonous gameplay and wretched camera."
