= Nicktoons: Attack of the Toybots =

2007 action-adventure video game

- PAL cover art for Nintendo Wii
- Developers: Blue Tongue Entertainment (Wii, PS2); Natsume Co., Ltd. (DS); Firemint (GBA)
- Publisher: THQ
- Director: Robert Blackadder
- Designers: Phil Anderson; Trevor Gamon
- Programmer: Alister Hatt
- Artists: Julian Lamont; Tom Zuber
- Composer: Mick Gordon
- Series: Nicktoons Unite! SpongeBob SquarePants
- Platforms: Game Boy Advance, Nintendo DS, PlayStation 2, Wii
- Release: NA: October 23, 2007; EU: November 9, 2007; AU: November 17, 2007; JP: December 20, 2007; (Wii and DS versions only)
- Genre: Action-adventure
- Modes: Single-player, multiplayer

Nicktoons: Attack of the Toybots (known as SpongeBob to Nakamatachi: Toybot no Kougeki in Japan) is an action-adventure video game developed by Blue Tongue Entertainment and published by THQ for the Wii and PlayStation 2. Natsume Co., Ltd. developed an abridged version for the Nintendo DS while Firemint also did for the Game Boy Advance.

The game is an installment in the Nicktoons Unite! series, serving as a sequel to the 2005 game Nicktoons Unite! and the 2006 game Nicktoons: Battle for Volcano Island. The game features a dozen playable characters from various Nicktoons, including SpongeBob SquarePants, Invader Zim, Danny Phantom, The Adventures of Jimmy Neutron, Boy Genius, The Fairly OddParents, My Life as a Teenage Robot, Rocko's Modern Life, The Ren & Stimpy Show, Catscratch, El Tigre: The Adventures of Manny Rivera, and THQ's Tak and the Power of Juju.

== Gameplay ==
Nicktoons: Attack of the Toybots gameplay includes playing as two Nicktoon characters in some levels and piloting an operational mech suit (created by Jimmy Neutron) in others. Players journey through Bikini Bottom, Amity Park, the Ghost Zone (GBA version only), Fairy World, Pupununu Village (handheld version only), Retroville (handheld version only), and Calamitous' Lair (console version only), as well as the Toybot Factory, which is divided into multiple segments.

== Plot ==
In the opening cutscene, Professor Calamitous appears on a reality show called "The Biggest Genius", claiming that after feeding fairies Krabby Patties, they emit a magical gas that, when combined with ghost energy, can be used as a form of fuel for his army of "Toybots," evil toy duplicates of abducted and scanned Nicktoons. Meanwhile, in Bikini Bottom, SpongeBob and Patrick are delivering a truckload of several million Krabby Patties to a processing plant. Upon their arrival, a robot sucks up all the Krabby Patties, and Patrick, unintentionally, in the process; SpongeBob gives chase, and eventually finds his way into the factory.

After fighting his way through the factory, SpongeBob finds Patrick vacuum-packed like a toy. After freeing Patrick, they meet Tak of the Pupununu People, who claims to have been abducted and scanned. The 3 later meet with Timmy Turner, Stimpy, Rocko, GIR, Jenny/XJ-9 and Jimmy Neutron, who were also abducted. Together, the group meets ChadBot, Calamitous' robot assistant, and assist him in collecting "master models" of the various Toybots; after collecting enough of them, ChadBot allows Jimmy to contact Danny, who reveals that Calamitous' toy army has taken over his house to use the Ghost Portal's energy. Jimmy tells Danny and Sam to meet him and the other heroes at Amity Park's EvilToyCo outlet; once they arrive, the group uses large mech suits to battle the Saucer Men(which Calamitous has been using to abduct the heroes from their worlds), before heading to Fairy World. Patrick frees Jorgen Von Strangle from a glass prison to destroy the Fairy Harvester, and the group leaves to confront Calamitous.

The heroes then unexpectedly enter The Biggest Genius' filming set, where ChadBot is revealed to be the winner. The host reveals to Calamitous that ChadBot's creation of the Toybot fuel formula and his collection of master models resulted in his win. ChadBot credits the heroes for his rise to success, before shaving Calamitous' mustache off using his prize.

== Reception ==
Reception

Aggregate scores
Aggregator	Score
GameRankings	65% (GBA)
Metacritic	54/100 (DS); 60/100 (Wii)

Review scores
Publication	Score
GameZone	7.2/10 (DS); 6.9/10 (PS2)
IGN	7/10 (DS); 6/10 (Wii)

Nicktoons: Attack of the Toybots received "mixed or average reviews". Meghan Sullivan of IGN gave the Wii version of the game a score of 6 out of 10, stating that "Nicktoons: Attack of The Toybots is by no means a stellar game, but if you're a parent looking to entertain your kid for a few hours while you go out, then this might do the trick. Otherwise pass on this and wait for something better." Jack DeVries of IGN gave the Nintendo DS version of the game a score of 7 out of 10, concluding that "This is the best Nicktoons game yet. I know, that isn't saying much since Unite and Battle for Volcano Island kind of sucked. And really, this isn't a stellar title. It gets pretty repetitive and it's not very long. But for fans of Nickelodeon cartoons, it's got enough characters and unlockables to be pretty appealing. The minor voicework is just enough to be neat, and with multiplayer and so many characters, it's actually a game that could be played multiple times. I just wish Rocko was a playable character." The Wii version of the game received a score of 60 out of 100 from Metacritic based on 4 reviews, while the Nintendo DS version of the game received a Metacritic score of 54 out of 100 based on 4 reviews.

== Sequel ==
The game was followed by SpongeBob SquarePants Featuring Nicktoons: Globs of Doom for the Nintendo DS, PlayStation 2 and Wii on October 20, 2008.
