= SpongeBob SquarePants: Underpants Slam =

2007 video game

- Xbox Live cover art
- Developer: Blitz Arcade
- Publishers: THQ (until 2013); THQ Nordic (2018)
- Director: John Jarvis
- Producer: Team Bubble
- Designer: Jonathan Biddle
- Programmers: Michael Higgs; Duncan Fewkes; Alex May
- Artist: Rich Jones
- Composer: Matt Black
- Series: SpongeBob SquarePants
- Engine: BlitzTech
- Platform: Xbox 360 (XBLA)
- Release: December 26, 2007
- Genre: Action
- Modes: Single-player, multiplayer

SpongeBob SquarePants: Underpants Slam is an action puzzle video game developed by Blitz Arcade featuring licensed characters from SpongeBob SquarePants. The game was released on Xbox Live Arcade on December 26, 2007. The game, along with Screwjumper!, is publisher THQ's first game designed for download. It was delisted from the Xbox Live Marketplace in January 2013 after the bankruptcy of THQ. It was later relisted on September 24, 2018, by its successor company THQ Nordic, and was also made available on the Xbox One and Xbox Series X/S via backwards compatibility on November 15, 2021.

== Plot ==
A current storm has spread a shipment of the undergarments of Lord of the Sea Neptune's underwear, spreading them across the ocean floor. Neptune has called upon SpongeBob, Patrick, Mr. Krabs, Plankton, and Sandy to collect the lost undergarments, with a reward offered to the one who collects the most underwear.

== Gameplay ==
Screenshot of gameplay.

Players progress through 9 levels of play by collecting 99 pairs of underwear in each. Playable characters include SpongeBob SquarePants, Patrick Star, Eugene Krabs, Sheldon Plankton and Sandy Cheeks. Levels are populated by jellyfish, who can swim away with pairs of underpants. These stolen underpants can only be retrieved by attacking the jellyfish, failure to attack at the right moment results in an electrical shock. Most pairs of underpants are scattered around levels, though several are hidden in objects such as pipes and boxes which must be destroyed. Power-ups such as a magnet to draw in nearby bloomers can be collected throughout the levels, though some can have negative effects such as reversing the controls.

== Reception ==
Underpants Slam has a score of 55 on Metacritic and a score of 3.5 out of 5 on GamesRadar.
