= SpongeBob's Surf & Skate Roadtrip =

2011 video game

- Xbox 360 Cover
- Developers: Blitz Games (Xbox 360); Sabarasa Inc. (Nintendo DS)
- Publisher: THQ
- Director: Aaron Miller
- Producer: Team Quantum
- Designers: Becky Hewitt; Peter Theophilus
- Programmers: Duncan Fewkes; Matthew Hampton; Matthew Hayward
- Artists: Steve Andrew; Paul Bannister; Brian Hartley
- Writer: Stuart Maine
- Composer: Matt Black
- Series: SpongeBob SquarePants
- Platforms: Nintendo DS; Xbox 360
- Release: NA: November 8, 2011; AU: November 10, 2011; EU: November 11, 2011
- Genres: Adventure, sports
- Modes: Single-player, multiplayer

SpongeBob's Surf & Skate Roadtrip is a SpongeBob SquarePants video game based on SpongeBob's Runaway Roadtrip. The video game was developed by Blitz Games on Xbox 360 and Sabarasa Inc. on Nintendo DS and published by THQ. It is available for Nintendo DS and Xbox 360. It is the first SpongeBob game on Xbox to use Kinect. It was also the final Nickelodeon game published by THQ until SpongeBob SquarePants: Battle for Bikini Bottom – Rehydrated in 2020 under THQ Nordic.

== Plot ==
In Story Mode, SpongeBob and Patrick relive their crazy road trip to the beach through some slideshows leading into arcade-style play. In Challenge Mode, a player can do freestyle and explore a new never-before-seen world in Bikini Bottom.

== Reception ==
The game has received mixed reviews. Andrew Hayward of the Official Xbox Magazine reviewed the video game and wrote "Surf & Skate Roadtrip remains a decent Kinect pick for a few hours of amusement, especially for young SpongeBob fans." Mike of the 123Kinect.com gave the video game a 5/10 rating based on 123 reviews. He wrote "If you or your kids are fine with the foot deal, then its really a mediocre game, may give them something to do for a day or two but that will probably be it. I'd wait until it's in the bargain bin if you must have it." Common Sense Media's review of this video game stated that the game is fun but forgettable.

== See also ==
- List of skateboarding video games
- SpongeBob SquarePants video games
