= SpongeBob's Atlantis SquarePantis (video game) =

2007 video game

- North American Wii cover art
- Developers: Blitz Games (Wii, PS2); Altron (DS, GBA)
- Publisher: THQ
- Directors: Chris Viggers (Wii, PS2); Yuhei Fujita (DS, GBA)
- Producers: Team RocFISH (Wii, PS2); Yoshihiro Tanaka (DS, GBA)
- Designers: Mark Digger; Alex Johnson; Jon Law (Wii, PS2); Yuhei Fujita; Tomoya Hiwatari (DS, GBA)
- Programmers: Chris Bell; Steve Bond; Garry Hughes (Wii, PS2); Shimpei Echigo; Koji Kanagaki; Yohei Shimada (DS, GBA)
- Artists: Shakkel Alli; Malcolm Burke; Chris Hudson (Wii, PS2); Daisuke Nakano; Katsuhiko Hayashi; Yuki Hagino (DS, GBA)
- Writers: Myles McLeod; Stuart Maine (Wii, PS2)
- Composers: Matt Black; Todd Baker; Simon Barford; Richard Blackley; Edward Hargrave; Peter Ward (Wii, PS2); Tomoyoshi Sato (DS, GBA)
- Series: SpongeBob SquarePants
- Platforms: Game Boy Advance; Nintendo DS; Wii; PlayStation 2
- Release: Nintendo DS, Game Boy Advance: NA: October 23, 2007; EU: February 8, 2008 (DS); AU: February 28, 2008 (DS); JP: June 26, 2008 (DS); PlayStation 2: NA: October 23, 2007; EU: February 8, 2008; Wii: NA: November 12, 2007; EU: February 14, 2008; AU: February 28, 2008
- Genre: Action-adventure
- Modes: Single-player, multiplayer

SpongeBob's Atlantis SquarePantis is a 2007 video game based on the 2007 TV movie of the same name which aired as a special episode of the television series SpongeBob SquarePants. The Wii and PlayStation 2 versions were developed by Blitz Games. The Game Boy Advance and Nintendo DS versions were developed by Altron. The Wii, PS2 and Game Boy Advance versions received mixed reviews, though the DS version was received more positively.

== Plot ==
The game begins with SpongeBob and his friends in medias res escaping from Atlantis. Meanwhile, Plankton rampages around Atlantis with a tank he "borrowed" until he comes across the gang. SpongeBob and Patrick begin to remember how they got into this situation. They have a flashback that starts with them blowing bubbles until they get trapped in a big bubble that carries them into a cave (only the flashback is featured in the Nintendo DS and Game Boy Advance versions of the game, not the introduction). The duo make their way through the cave, avoiding ghost pirates while searching for ladders to venture deeper into the caverns, where they find the missing half of the Atlantean Amulet. Patrick thinks it is related to SpongeBob's ancestors because of the word "antis" on it. They bring it to the Bikini Bottom Museum to see what it is, taking pictures of exhibits and taking down tourists and security blocking the way. Squidward is shocked to see that they found the other half of the amulet. Sandy and Mr. Krabs tag along while walking in the museum. Squidward conjoins the two halves and the path to Atlantis is revealed: the path is a flying bus. The bus is powered by song, and the group starts to sing to get to Atlantis. The bus crash-lands along the way due to a mistake on Patrick's part, forcing the gang to drive it around the city to find the bus pieces and tool kits needed to fix it.

After repairing the bus and arriving at Atlantis, the group is greeted by the Lord Royal Highness (or LRH). LRH gives them a tour around the Atlantean palace, during which they have to avoid traps that were set around Atlantis for some reason. Mr. Krabs begins to collect some treasure to take with him with some help from Sandy and her bubble-catching gun. Squidward poses for the artists in the art studio. Unbeknownst to them, Plankton hid in the Atlantis bus compartment on the way there. He plans to use the Atlantean weapons, the most advanced of all time, to destroy SpongeBob and his friends and take over the world. After getting out of the bus, he sneaks around Atlantis and makes his way to the weapon room.

While taking pictures of attractions (dealing with tourists and Atlantean guards blocking the way), Patrick accidentally destroys the oldest living bubble. He tells the truth to LRH, who shows them the real bubble. Squidward reminds them that the bubble that Patrick destroyed was a prop for tourists. Patrick again accidentally pops it for real, angering LRH. The group make a run for it, in which they must evade Atlantean forces while searching for paper clips to unlock doors. Later, Sandy uses Squidward as a gun to take down the soldiers. Plankton rampages around the city in his tank just like in the beginning and confronts the gang, ending the flashback. He fires his weapon, but is shocked to see it shoots ice cream. LRH captures Plankton, believing he is a talking speck, and displays him as both a replacement for the recently destroyed bubble and the national treasure of Atlantis. He then orders one of his soldiers to get rid of the amulet so that the troublemakers can't return. The soldier makes his way across Atlantis to the dumpster and tosses the amulet into it. The gang then heads home back to Bikini Bottom on board the bus.

== Gameplay ==
=== Console versions ===
The main characters (SpongeBob, Patrick, Sandy, Squidward, Mr. Krabs, and Plankton) have different abilities, most often, these abilities are related to them in one way or another. SpongeBob can use his spatula to flip things and open a portcullis. Patrick can lift other characters or an anchor and throw them over to another platform and then pull him across. Squidward, on the other hand, uses the tentacles on his feet to run across moving carpets and on treadmills to break open doors or a portcullis. Mr. Krabs uses his pockets to attract him to money and sometimes clear path by absorbing the money. He can also get across platforms by being attracted to the money across. Sandy uses her lasso to get over the gaps by grabbing bridge handles and opening the bridges herself by pulling the lasso. She can also grab things or other characters. Plankton does not have any special moves and can only be played as in certain missions, in two of them, he drives the green tank.

=== Handheld versions ===
The main characters (except Plankton) are controlled in pairs. Upon finding a changing station, the player can choose which two characters to control. These characters have different abilities when one character picks up the other and then presses L and the character that is being held does a special move. (For example, if SpongeBob picks up Sandy and the player presses L, Sandy will flip in the air and do an exploding karate chop. This only works with the Nintendo DS version of the game.)

== Reception ==
Reception

Aggregate scores
Aggregator	Score			
Aggregator	DS	GBA	PS2	Wii
GameRankings	66%	72%	60%	62%
Metacritic	64/100			

Review scores
Publication	Score			
Publication	DS	GBA	PS2	Wii
GameZone	8.3/10	6.9/10	5/10	5/10
IGN	6/10		5.1/10	5.3/10

According to Metacritic, the Nintendo DS version received "mixed or average reviews". On GameRankings, the PlayStation 2, Wii, Nintendo DS, and Game Boy Advance versions of Atlantis SquarePantis hold ratings of 60%, 62%, 66%, and 72%, respectively. An IGN review of the DS version was headlined "SpongeBob actually managed to be boring." Likewise, the most-criticized aspects of all versions were the clunky camera control, the lackluster AI, and the annoying method of having to return to the start of the level to switch characters. It was also called "too short" and "too easy" for older gamers. An IGN review of the Wii version called the game "second-rate", "sloppy", "tedious", and "really boring". The graphics were criticized for being "bland". The PlayStation 2 version was criticized for the same reasons but was given a slightly lower rating, because IGN wrote that Wiimote controls spice up the shooting games.
