= SpongeBob SquarePants: The Yellow Avenger =

2005 video game

- European PSP box art
- Developer: Tantalus Media
- Publisher: THQ
- Director: David Hewitt
- Producer: John Szoke
- Designers: David Hewitt; Clint Reid
- Programmer: Robert Walkley
- Artists: Adam Moder; Matthew Chapman
- Composer: Martin Schioeler
- Series: SpongeBob SquarePants
- Platforms: Nintendo DS; PlayStation Portable
- Release: Nintendo DS: NA: November 7, 2005; EU: November 25, 2005; PlayStation Portable: NA: March 8, 2006; EU: April 13, 2006
- Genres: Platformer, adventure
- Modes: Single-player, multiplayer

SpongeBob SquarePants: The Yellow Avenger is a SpongeBob SquarePants video game developed by Tantalus Media and published by THQ for Nintendo DS and PlayStation Portable. It is the first SpongeBob game to be released on both consoles.

== Plot ==
While on his way to see Patrick, SpongeBob sees the Dirty Bubble rush by with a captured Barnacle Boy. SpongeBob calls Mermaid Man to help rescue him and they follow the Dirty Bubble to a laundromat. Unfortunately, during the confrontation, SpongeBob accidentally puts the Dirty Bubble into a washing machine with the Mermaid Man's belt, which causes him to split into countless dirty bubbles. SpongeBob acquires Mermaid Man's powers when he wears the belt. SpongeBob has to stop villains such as Man Ray, The Sinister Slug, Jumbo Shrimp, Atomic Flounder, and the Dirty Bubble, using Mermaid Man's powers to save Bikini Bottom. The story is divided into Acts, each with a different villain trying to wreak havoc on Bikini Bottom: Man Ray wants to flood Goo Lagoon; Sinister Slug has an evil plan to stop a talent show; Jumbo Shrimp, with the help of Plankton, creates a machine to shrink people; the Atomic Flounder causes chaos in Industrial Park; and the Dirty Bubble (who has become whole again) returns with the machine the Jumbo Shrimp used in the third act. He plans to hit SpongeBob with more Little Dirty Bubbles. Once the Dirty Bubble is defeated, SpongeBob returns the belt to Mermaid Man as he and Barnacle Boy return to retirement.

== Reception ==
Reception

Aggregate score
Aggregator	Score	
Aggregator	DS	PSP
Metacritic	67%	48%

Review scores
Publication	Score	
Publication	DS	PSP
GameZone	7.5/10	5/10
IGN	7.7/10	5.7/10

On the review-aggregating website Metacritic, the DS version has a 67 percent score, indicating "Mixed or average reviews", while the PSP version has a 48 percent, indicating "Generally unfavorable reviews".

Ed Lewis of IGN praised the graphics and music of the PSP version, but criticized its "sparse and uninspired" sound effects, as well as, "Confusing menus, lack of guidance, and the creepiest loading screen that's been seen in a long, long while." Lewis also criticized the repetitive gameplay, writing, "If the levels were linear and you went through the game once these would be a fun challenge, but there's lots and lots and lots of backtracking involved and much of it can't be skipped."

Marc Nix of IGN wrote a positive review of the DS version, favorably comparing gameplay to Indiana Jones and the Fate of Atlantis for its "unique mix of action and exploring." Nix called the game "a visual treat" and praised it for utilizing the system's touchscreen to creatively interact with objects. However, Nix criticized the game for some difficult gameplay and for not utilizing voice-overs from the stars of the television series.

Louis Bedigian of GameZone criticized the PSP version, writing that its worlds "feel empty" and that the game would only appeal to "kids with patience, kids who aren't bored by running and jumping in a bland environment." Bedigian praised some of the graphics, but criticized the game's long and repetitive loading times: "At least three of my first 15 minutes with this game were reserved for load times. That's potentially 12 minutes of loading for every hour of gameplay." Bedigian enjoyed the game's story but criticized the lack of voice-overs: "Without voice-overs, and with bland objectives that aren't overly fun, mission explanations are told through text. Lengthy, uninviting paragraphs that will surely turn off the game's target audience."

Anise Hollingshead of GameZone wrote a positive review of the DS version, praising its humor, its voiceovers, its use of the DS touchscreen, and its graphics, writing that it "is drawn exactly like the TV show." Hollingshead noted that the addition of minigames would have increased the game's overall enjoyment and replayability, but wrote, "Exploration and conversation are what players will experience the most, which is a welcomed change from most handheld games. It's fun to just explore with SpongeBob and talk to his silly friends."
