= SpongeBob HeroPants =

2015 video game

- North American cover art
- Developer: Behaviour Santiago
- Publisher: Activision
- Series: SpongeBob SquarePants
- Engine: Unity
- Platforms: Nintendo 3DS; PlayStation Vita; Xbox 360
- Release: NA: February 3, 2015; EU: March 26, 2015
- Genres: Action-adventure, platform
- Modes: Single-player, multiplayer

SpongeBob HeroPants is a 2015 action-adventure platform game based on the animated film The SpongeBob Movie: Sponge Out of Water. Developed by Behaviour Santiago and published by Activision, it was released on February 3, 2015 in North America and on March 26, 2015 in Europe for the Nintendo 3DS, PlayStation Vita (cross-compatible with PlayStation TV), and Xbox 360.

== Gameplay ==
All characters have a simple attack and can use a "Burger Blaster" for a long range attack. A meter will constantly fill up which will allow for the selected character to enter Superhero Mode, which will allow a special attack to replace the Burger Blaster until the meter empties.

== Plot ==
The game takes place sometime after the events of Sponge Out of Water. It begins with SpongeBob walking to the Krusty Krab and thinking he's going to have a "normal" day at work. Later, SpongeBob opens the front door of the Krusty Krab and then notices that Sandy and Patrick are coming along too. When Patrick, SpongeBob, and Sandy enter the Krusty Krab, Mr. Krabs, Plankton, and Squidward are getting chased around by random objects and SpongeBob states things are going not normal at all. SpongeBob thinks it's Plankton causing this, but suddenly, Bubbles (voiced by Jeff Bennett) comes out of a space triangle and tells SpongeBob and his friends that Plankton isn't responsible and explains that someone is using the last page of the magic book to make weird things happen (while the book was destroyed in the film, the final page was not) as well making duplicates of the page. He then holds up a feather and writes in one of the clone pages he found, which suddenly gives SpongeBob and his friends temporary superhero powers that can save Bikini Bottom from a mysterious group of enemies someone created and recover the other clone pages.

After tangling with Plankton's Giant Robot and Squidasaurus Rex, SpongeBob and his friends discover that SpongeBob is the one who caused the not normal events, judging by the handwriting, as the last page somehow entered his mind. Plankton then writes on one of the pages they found, having him, SpongeBob, and the others to enter SpongeBob's mind to get the last page and wake SpongeBob up (in which he had fallen asleep when everyone else went into his mind). After the last page is collected, the gang exits SpongeBob's mind and begins to celebrate. Bubbles then appears again to get the collected pages and depending on the amount of pages that have been collected in the game, one of the two alternate endings is shown.

If all pages are not collected, Bubbles gives the gang Plankton's time machine from the film so they can retrieve the last few pages. Then, a Patricksaurus comes and tries to kill the gang, so they quickly escape in the time machine. If all pages are collected, Bubbles gives them the time machine so the gang can relive any moment from their exciting day. Bubbles then invites the gang to watch him breakdance, to which all of the characters leave except for SpongeBob and Patrick.

== Development ==
The game was announced on October 18, 2014. A trailer for the game was released on January 6, 2015.

== Reception ==
Marc Saltzman of Common Sense Media gave it 2 out of 5 stars stating, "unless you're a huge SpongeBob SquarePants fan who can't wait for this game to appear in the bargain bin of your favorite game store, there isn't anything too exciting here." Spanish site Atomix said the game "would be an acceptable game if we saw it in a PlayStation One, but now it's unacceptable."

=== Accolades ===
The game was nominated at the 2016 Kids' Choice Awards for Favorite Video Game for that year.

List of awards and nominations
Award	Category	Recipient(s) and nominee(s)	Result
Nickelodeon Kids' Choice Awards	Favorite Video Game	N/A	Nominated
