= SpongeBob vs. The Big One: Beach Party Cook-Off =

2009 video game

- Developer: The Fizz Factor
- Publisher: THQ (Note: Released under the Play THQ label)
- Director: Marshall Andrews
- Producer: Joye Price
- Designers: Marshall Andrews; Christopher Mosconi
- Programmer: Jim Martin
- Artist: David Genet
- Composer: Noel Gabriel
- Series: SpongeBob SquarePants
- Platform: Nintendo DS
- Release: NA: March 3, 2009; AU: March 5, 2009; EU: March 6, 2009
- Genre: Action
- Modes: Single-player, multiplayer

SpongeBob vs. The Big One: Beach Party Cook-Off (Released in Europe as SpongeBob SquarePants: Frantic Fry-Cook) is an action video game developed by The Fizz Factor and published by THQ.

== Gameplay ==
The game consists of cooking mini-games, similar to Cooking Mama, and restaurant management. The player oversees the staff of Planktons as they work to fill the orders of the day. Occasionally, the player will be asked to help a Plankton complete a task by playing a mini-game representing a cooking activity. In all, there are 25 different mini-games that are used to represent tasks like slicing, stirring, whisking, and garnishing. The game also has a multiplayer mode, in which the player who prepares the dish in the least amount of time is the winner. While the Planktons do most of the work during the regular shifts, challenges where the player must prepare an entire recipe on their own are unlocked after a few shifts. The player can also buy new recipes, manage the menu, and decorate the restaurant.

== Plot ==
Both Mr. Krabs and Plankton want to cook for Jack Kahuna Laguna's beach party. Since they can't come to an agreement, Jack demands a competition to see which cook is the best. The winner would get to serve their food at the party. SpongeBob is adamant on the Krusty Krab winning but he needs help since they don't have much staff. Plankton's cousins want to help him, but since he won't pay them anything, SpongeBob recruits them and tells them that Mr. Krabs will pay if they want to help him in the competition throughout the game, players will play through 5 "Episodes", each with a new judge (such as Gene, Mermaid Man and Barnacle Boy, Kevin the Sea Cucumber, and King Neptune) after every three workdays, and a new theme for the Krusty Krab. Plankton will attempt to sabotage their efforts either by replacing the products with his own and copying their recipes. The player will then need to help SpongeBob train a group of Plankton's cousins to become the best chefs in Bikini Bottom. Throughout the game, the player helps SpongeBob and his friends train them to cook multiple foods like the Krabby Patty, Fried Seaweed Sandwiches, and many more. The player works on a daily schedule to serve a number of customers before being done for the day. Each customer asks for certain orders that players must fulfill by performing several mini-games related to the dish. High-scoring dishes receive larger tips, which can be used to buy more recipes or skills for the plankton helpers. SpongeBob eventually wins the challenge, leaving Plankton in defeat.

== Development and release ==
On January 12, 2009, THQ announced that the game was being developed and would be released later that year. It is based on the episode SpongeBob SquarePants vs. The Big One. The game was released on March 3, 2009, the same day as the episode's DVD release.

== Reception ==
Reception

Review score
Publication	Score
Common Sense Media	3/5

Reviewing the game for Common Sense Media, Erin Bell wrote: "The game stays true to the series, and there's no objectionable content to speak of – besides the fact that the Planktons are being paid far less than minimum wage."
