= Nicktoons Unite! =

2005 action-adventure video game

- North American GameCube cover art
- Developers: Blue Tongue Entertainment (PS2, GC); Climax Action (GBA, DS)
- Publisher: THQ
- Director: Kevin Chan
- Designers: Trevor Gamon; Nick Hagger; Drew Morrow
- Programmer: Alister Hatt
- Artist: Julian Lamont
- Composers: Stephan Schütze (PS2, GC); Matthew Simmonds (GBA, DS)
- Series: Nicktoons Unite! SpongeBob SquarePants
- Platforms: PlayStation 2, GameCube, Nintendo DS, Game Boy Advance
- Release: GameCube, Game Boy Advance, PlayStation 2: NA: October 26, 2005; PAL: March 3, 2006; Nintendo DS: NA: January 10, 2006; PAL: March 3, 2006
- Genre: Action-adventure
- Modes: Single-player, multiplayer

Nicktoons Unite! (also known as SpongeBob SquarePants and Friends: Unite! in PAL regions) is a 2005 action-adventure video game featuring characters and levels from SpongeBob SquarePants, Danny Phantom, The Adventures of Jimmy Neutron, Boy Genius, and The Fairly OddParents. The game was developed by Blue Tongue Entertainment (PS2, GC) and Climax Action (GBA, DS) and published by THQ. An Xbox version was also announced but was never released.

In the game, the player can control SpongeBob SquarePants, Danny Phantom, Jimmy Neutron, and Timmy Turner as they work together to stop an evil plan concocted by villains from each character's series.

== Gameplay ==
In the console version, all four characters are on-screen at the same time. The player has the option to switch between them, with the non-selected characters being automatically controlled. The console version also offers multiplayer, where up to four players can control and switch between the characters as well. Each character has several abilities for specific situations, such as SpongeBob's pillar-destroying Bubble Bombs, Danny's glass-breaking Ghostly Wail, Timmy's water-freezing Freeze Glove, and Jimmy's long-range Neutron Flare. Jimmy's dog Goddard can be found in all four worlds, including the level that takes place inside himself, to upgrade the player's weapons and abilities.

The Nintendo DS version is a 3D platformer where the player controls one of the four characters at a time, which can be selected at any moment via the touchscreen. The Game Boy Advance version is a 2D platformer in which the player must alternate between the two characters given at the beginning of the level in order to progress. It uses pre-rendered 3D sprites based on the models of the Nintendo DS version.

== Plot ==
The game opens with SpongeBob discovering that Plankton is taking over Bikini Bottom with gigantic vacuum machines. Goddard exits a portal behind SpongeBob's house, and displays a message to him from Jimmy Neutron. Following Goddard through the portal, he meets Jimmy Neutron, Timmy Turner, and Danny Phantom in Jimmy's lab. Jimmy coats SpongeBob with self-regenerating moisture to keep him from dehydrating outside of water. Jimmy explains that his latest invention, the Universe Portal Machine, has been copied by Professor Calamitous, who has formed a Syndicate with Plankton, Vlad Plasmius, and Denzel Crocker, and are already stealing energy from their worlds.

SpongeBob and the Nicktoons attempt to teleport into Casper High, but arrive in Vlad's castle, where he reveals that his ghost portal is siphoning energy from the Ghost Zone, and has captured Danny's parents. Vlad knocks the group out and imprisons them in the Ghost Zone Prison. Befriending the Box Ghost, the heroes escape after defeating Walker. Danny leads the heroes to the Fenton Works ghost portal, and meet Sam Manson and Tucker Foley. Upon returning to the castle, the gang destroy the portal's generators. Danny possesses his father and uses his Ghost Gauntlets to pummel Vlad, but ends up escaping.

The heroes' then travel to Bikini Bottom, using Jimmy's air gum to breathe underwater. Sandy sends them to Jellyfish Fields to meet Patrick, but is sucked into a jellyfish-capturing harvester. After destroying the harvesters, the group find themselves on the Flying Dutchman's ship. Danny persuades him to let them go in exchange for bringing back his old crewmates. Upon arriving at the Chum Bucket, they free Patrick and the jellyfish. On the roof, they battle Plankton piloting a gigantic robotic crab to rescue Mr. Krabs, and learn that the villains have been extracting energy to power a Doomsday Machine.

In Dimmsdale, SpongeBob and the Nicktoons infiltrate and shut down the power to Crocker's golden fortress. They then head to Fairy World, where they encounter Jorgen von Strangle, free the fairies, and defeat Crocker piloting an exosuit at The Big Wand.

The group then return to Jimmy's lab and meet Cindy Vortex. Jimmy then realizes that Calamitous has planted a flea-bot in Goddard to spy on him. The heroes use Jimmy's shrink ray to shrink down to enter Goddard, defeat the flea-bot, and hack it to locate Calamitous' lair. The heroes defeat the Syndicate, and SpongeBob unplugs the Doomsday Machine, thus, saving the Nicktoon universes all thanks to him. With Calamitous in prison, Jimmy gives the heroes each a Neutron Recaller in case of a future incident, and they part ways.

== Reception ==
Reception

Aggregate score
Aggregator	Score
Metacritic	53/100 (PS2/NDS)

Review scores
Publication	Score
GameSpot	5.6/10 (DS)
GameZone	6.8/10 (PS2); 6/10 (GBA); 6.5/10 (DS)
IGN	5/10 (DS)
PlayStation Official Magazine – UK	4/10

All versions of the game received generally mixed reviews, being mostly criticized for the monotony of the gameplay. In an IGN review, Mark Bozon gave the DS version of the game 5/10 stars, stating the crossover concept had been done "far better in previous games." In a more positive review for the PlayStation 2 version, Gamezone opined that "while somewhat repetitious, the linear design and simple control schemes will draw players along and it is not hard to work through the levels." Review aggregator Metacritic gave the PlayStation 2 version of the game a score of 53 out of 100, based on eight reviews.

== Sequels ==
The game has spawned three sequels: Nicktoons: Battle for Volcano Island (2006), Nicktoons: Attack of the Toybots (2007), and SpongeBob SquarePants Featuring Nicktoons: Globs of Doom (2008).

In 2025, a new game called Nicktoons & The Dice of Destiny was released.
