= SpongeBob SquarePants: Legend of the Lost Spatula =

2001 video game

- North American cover art
- Developers: Vicarious Visions; Engine Software
- Publisher: THQ
- Director: Chris Degnan
- Designers: Chris Degnan; Brent Boylen
- Programmers: Jan-Lieuwe Koopmans; Ruud van de Moosdijk; Ivo Wubbels
- Artist: Jorge Diaz
- Composer: Manfred Linzner
- Series: SpongeBob SquarePants
- Platform: Game Boy Color
- Release: NA: March 5, 2001; EU: May 4, 2001
- Genre: Action
- Mode: Single-player

SpongeBob SquarePants: Legend of the Lost Spatula is a 2001 platform action video game developed by Vicarious Visions and published by THQ for the Game Boy Color handheld game console. It is the first video game to be based on SpongeBob SquarePants. The game's story centers on SpongeBob SquarePants, a sea sponge who lives in the undersea town of Bikini Bottom and works for Mr. Krabs as the fry cook of the Krusty Krab fast food restaurant. SpongeBob is destined to become the ocean's greatest fry cook, and must embark on a quest to retrieve a golden spatula from the Flying Dutchman, a pirate ghost. The game features platforming-style gameplay, as well as many characters from the television series.

== Gameplay ==
SpongeBob SquarePants: Legend of the Lost Spatula is a single-player action game. The player takes on the role of SpongeBob, traversing 11 levels in search of the Flying Dutchman's Golden Spatula in order to become the ocean's greatest short-order cook.

The levels generally consist of straightforward platforming challenges, but there is also combat including 4 boss battles. Much of the combat and puzzle-solving elements of the game are centered around collecting tools/weapons and swapping between them.

== Story ==
While riding his bike, SpongeBob discovers a statue which has a base that resembles a stove. Informing Mr. Krabs of this discovery, he explains that the statue is used to dedicate a legendary fry cook who wields a golden spatula, which is in the ruins of a collapsed civilization now controlled by the Flying Dutchman. Krabs urges SpongeBob to find the spatula just so he can make a fortune. SpongeBob begins his journey to search for the missing stove dials that will open the way to the spatula. Once he finds them all, he uses them to open the statue's base and enters the Flying Dutchman's domain. There, the Flying Dutchman challenges SpongeBob, who prevails and claims the golden spatula. As SpongeBob begins serving up a large supply of Krabby Patties with the golden spatula, Mr. Krabs is able to make a large amount of money in turn.

== Reception and legacy ==
Reception

Aggregate score
Aggregator	Score
GameRankings	60.60%

Review scores
Publication	Score
GameSpot	3.8/10
IGN	6/10
Nintendo Power	2.5/5

The game has received mixed reviews. Frank Provo of GameSpot said "One could argue that SpongeBob SquarePants: Legend of the Lost Spatula is geared toward the younger audience of the TV series, which would explain the game's simplified gameplay and lack of variety. However, while the plot is endearing and the characters will no doubt appeal to the series' fans, there is no evidence to suggest that children would actually enjoy playing a game this unremarkable – let alone adults". Provo criticized the game for its "simplified gameplay" and "lack of variety", but gave praise to the graphics, saying the game "at least looks decent". Jon Griffith of IGN complimented the game as a "decent platformer" with "large levels, multiple objectives, and amusing characters" but criticized it for its password saving system, confusing level design, and difficulty in certain aspects of gameplay.

There have been many more games released under the SpongeBob SquarePants IP, frequently featuring the Golden Spatula and platforming gameplay established in this title.
