= SpongeBob SquarePants: Lights, Camera, Pants! =

2005 video game

- North American box art
- Developers: THQ Studio Australia (PS2, GC, Xbox); WayForward Technologies (GBA); AWE Games (PC)
- Publisher: THQ
- Directors: Jon Cartwright; Dave MacMinn (PS2, GC, Xbox); Marc Gomez (GBA)
- Producers: Jon Cartwright (PS2, GC, Xbox); Michael Dubose (PC); Derek Dutilly (GBA)
- Designers: Craig Duturbure (PS2, GC, Xbox); Marc Gomez (GBA)
- Programmers: Timothy Groth (PS2, GC, Xbox); Keith Verity (PC); Larry Holdaway (GBA)
- Artists: Donnie Madsen; Steve Middleton (PS2, GC, Xbox); Craig Kelly (PC); Renee Lee; Jacob Stevens (GBA)
- Writers: Craig Duturbure; Dave MacMinn (PS2, GC, Xbox); John Casamassina (PC); James Burkes; Marc Gomez (GBA)
- Composers: Charlie Brissette; Hamilton Altstatt (PS2, GC, Xbox); Joe Abbati (PC); Martin Schioeler (GBA)
- Series: SpongeBob SquarePants
- Engine: RenderWare (PS2, GC, Xbox)
- Platforms: Xbox; PlayStation 2; GameCube; Game Boy Advance; Microsoft Windows
- Release: PlayStation 2 & Xbox: NA: October 19, 2005; EU: October 21, 2005; PC, GameCube & Game Boy Advance: NA: October 19, 2005; EU: November 18, 2005
- Genre: Party
- Modes: Single-player, multiplayer

SpongeBob SquarePants: Lights, Camera, Pants! is a video game based on the TV series SpongeBob SquarePants. It was released in October 2005 for the Xbox, PlayStation 2, GameCube, Game Boy Advance, and Microsoft Windows, Versions for the Nintendo DS and PlayStation Portable were also announced, but were never released. It is the first SpongeBob SquarePants title to feature multiplayer mini-games, similar to the Mario Party video game series.

== Gameplay ==
=== Home console versions ===
In the home console versions of the game, the city of Bikini Bottom is producing an anniversary show of The New Adventures of Mermaid Man & Barnacle Boy, executive produced by Gill Hammerstein (voiced by Nolan North), in which the titular SpongeBob SquarePants wishes to play as the starring role. SpongeBob must compete with the other characters in the series – namely Patrick Star, Squidward Tentacles, Eugene H. Krabs, Sandy Cheeks, and Sheldon J. Plankton – in order to impress the talent scouts and land the lead role of the villain.

The game includes 30 unique minigames (referred to as "auditions") that have different play style and objectives, though the common goal is to get the highest points. Each location has a quota that must be matched to win the role; if no one has enough points to match the quota after three minigames, they have to play again, choosing one of the three to repeat. Each minigame is based on an area or location in Bikini Bottom. Every location has three minigames within it. There are a total of 8 locations for a total of 24 minigames that are played through story mode. The other six are unlockable bonus minigames. Examples of the minigames include a driving test, whose goal is to finish the first through three driving courses; a jailbreak, whose goal is to free as many prison inmates as possible without getting caught; and a rhythm minigame, whose goal is to match the short and long musical notes that travel toward a marker. There are two types of minigames: the free-for-all type, where all players compete against each other, and the 2-vs-2 type, where players are divided into two teams of two.

The game features six playable characters: SpongeBob, Squidward, Sandy, Plankton, Patrick, and Mr. Krabs. Before the game starts, the player has to choose one of the six characters, then choose whether to have up to three other players join or add AI-controlled opponents. All characters are available from the start and have only aesthetical differences in minigames, e.g. SpongeBob is marked yellow; they have no gameplay advantage over each other. However, the player has the option to choose gameplay difficulty in three different options (Easy, Med, Hard), and also set the AI opponents' difficulty in three options (Silly, Norm, Smart).

==== Game modes ====
In Story Mode, the players are required to obtain a certain number of popularity points to move through the eight locations in the game. If no characters achieve enough points, the minigames will have to be replayed until one of them passes the mark. If two or more characters achieve the same number of points, a tiebreaker game will be played to determine the winner, depending on how many of them are tied. Additionally, each location also ranks the number of points all four characters obtain; having the highest means that that particular character becomes the main star of the location's film segment. Once all eight locations are passed, the movie clips are combined to form a full-length cinematic.

There are three phases of Story Mode: Bronze, Silver, and Gold. The movies produced are the same; the difference lies in the number of points required to pass a location. Each phase also has its own action figures and artworks unlocked by fulfilling a certain objective and attaining a certain score, respectively, in a specific minigame. The game will warn the player when attempting to proceed to the next phase, since there is no way to go back to an earlier phase other than starting over from the Bronze phase; once the player choose to enter a new phase, all figures and artworks from the previously completed phase not yet collected will remain locked.

The game also includes Tournament mode, in which four players can compete in a tournament of up to five minigames. Also included is Single Audition, in which four players can compete in a single minigame. Any minigame that has been unlocked can be played in either mode. All three Story Mode phases also apply to Tournament and Single Audition, giving the players a chance to obtain figures and artwork they missed out on in Story Mode.

=== Movie ===
Once a Story Mode phase is completed, a full 30-minute-long film is available to view.

The film is the result of the wins in the audition games. In the episode of The New Adventures of Mermaid Man and Barnacle Boy, they get arrested by a police officer for being accused of stealing the Sand Stadium. In prison, they meet their foes, Man Ray and the Dirty Bubble, but find themselves teaming up with their arch rivals to save Bikini Bottom from their biggest foe yet; the Sneaky Hermit - whose goal is to take over Bikini Bottom by stealing every building and putting them on his back. Man Ray and the Dirty Bubble think the idea is crazy and only agree to help the heroes because the Hermit also stole their lairs. Eventually, the Hermit has taken every building in Bikini Bottom except for the Sea Needle, which is locked in place by a literal key lock. Mermaid Man cluelessly informs the Hermit that he can use window-washing platforms to get up and unlock the building. The heroes chase the Hermit with the window-washing platforms to stop him. Having gotten advice from a hunter in Jellyfish Fields, Barnacle Boy suggests to Mermaid Man to stop the Hermit by making him sneeze, thus dropping all of the buildings back into place. Mermaid Man uses pepper he got from the Krusty Krab to do so and the Hermit is defeated. At the end of the movie, Man Ray and the Dirty Bubble choose to remain evil and run off to continue doing dirty deeds against the citizens, while Mermaid Man and Barnacle Boy drive off to the Sand Stadium in their Invisible Boatmobile, ending the segment.

=== PC version ===
The PC version of the game is a point-and-click adventure, with the main objective being to find actors for the TV show.

=== Game Boy Advance version ===
In the Game Boy Advance version, Gil Hammerstein and his crew are going to film a special episode of The New Adventures of Mermaidman & Barnacleboy, but the two heroes are missing, so SpongeBob and his friends volunteer to find them. They are also offered roles for the special episode. The Game Boy Advance version is split into four worlds – Mermalair, S.S. Rest Home, Goo Lagoon, and Sound Stage. Each world contains four levels, consisting of platforming levels, driving levels, and mini-games. By completing levels, some extra mini-games can be unlocked and in one level per world, the character who reaches the end of the level earns a role. After completing the four worlds, the Final Game is unlocked, allowing the player to play the events of the TV show through mini-games.

The main collectibles in the game are Golden Stars, which are used as in-game currency. The Golden Stars can be used to buy extra lives or mini-games. The Game Boy Advance version features four playable characters: SpongeBob SquarePants, Patrick Star, Sandy Cheeks, and Squidward Tentacles. While a character must be chosen before playing a level, the player can change characters any time in the game. Each character has their own set of abilities, akin to games such as Super Mario Bros. 2.

== Reception ==
Reception

Aggregate scores
Aggregator	Score				
Aggregator	GBA	GameCube	PC	PS2	Xbox
GameRankings	N/A	59.75%	75%	N/A	53.67%
Metacritic	N/A	N/A	68/100	59/100	57/100

Review scores
Publication	Score				
Publication	GBA	GameCube	PC	PS2	Xbox
Eurogamer	N/A	4/10	N/A	N/A	N/A
IGN	N/A	7/10	N/A	N/A	N/A

IGN gave the home console version a generally good review. They gave it 8.5 points on its presentation, saying, "Makes excellent use of the license. Great, humorous cinemas and a fun storyline. A decent selection of mini-games. Slick menus. Some minor load times." They gave 7+ points to the graphics of the game, the sound, and the gameplay. Criticism from IGN was focused on the dialogue being repetitive and the game lacking depth. IGN gave it a 7 overall rating. Meanwhile, GameRankings gave the Xbox, GameCube, and PC versions a 53.67, a 59.75%, and a 75% respectively. Metacritic was mixed toward this game with the PlayStation 2, Xbox, and PC versions getting a 59 out of 100, a 57 out of 100, and a 68 out of 100 respectively.
