= Nicktoons: Battle for Volcano Island =

2006 action-adventure video game

- North American GameCube cover art
- Developers: Blue Tongue Entertainment (PS2, GC); Halfbrick (GBA); Natsume (DS)
- Publisher: THQ
- Director: Robert Blackadder
- Designers: Phil Anderson; Trevor Gamon
- Programmer: Alister Hatt
- Artists: Julian Lamont; Tom Zuber
- Composers: Stephan Schütze (PS2, GC); Andrew Curnock (GBA)
- Series: Nicktoons Unite! SpongeBob SquarePants
- Platforms: GameCube, Nintendo DS, PlayStation 2, Game Boy Advance
- Release: 2006
- Genre: Action-adventure
- Modes: Single-player, multiplayer

Nicktoons: Battle for Volcano Island (also known as SpongeBob and Friends: Battle for Volcano Island in PAL regions) is an action-adventure game developed by Blue Tongue Entertainment (PS2, GC), Halfbrick (GBA), Natsume (DS), published by THQ, and it is the sequel to the 2005 video game Nicktoons Unite!. In this game, players assume the role of six playable characters from the Nickelodeon shows SpongeBob SquarePants, Danny Phantom, and The Fairly OddParents. The plot involves SpongeBob SquarePants, Patrick Star, Sandy Cheeks, Danny Phantom, Sam Manson, Timmy Turner, with Cosmo, and Wanda trying to protect the island from an all-new villain named The Mawgu. Jimmy Neutron, Tucker Foley, and Squidward Tentacles also appear, but as non-playable characters.

== Plot ==
In an island world called Volcano Island, a trio of crabs, led by the Wise Old Crab and his two assistants are gathering around a ritual at Summoner's Rock to summon 'The Nine' heroes to defeat their ancient enemy, the Mawgu. However, the Mawgu breaks the circle of summoning, scattering the nine heroes across the island. SpongeBob SquarePants and Danny Phantom end up being summoned in front of The Wise Old Crab. He tells them that he has summoned them here and tells them that the Mawgu has escaped from his prison and is seeking vengeance against the island. The Mawgu has created a terrible ooze corrupting everything and everyone that it touches. However, according to the crabs' legends, the "Chosen Ones" can rescue everyone from the Mawgu Ooze and defeat the Mawgu.

SpongeBob and Danny fight the Mawgu's minions, finding Timmy Turner, Sam Manson, Tucker Foley, Sandy Cheeks, Squidward Tentacles, and Patrick Star. They find one of Jimmy Neutron's communication devices, learning that the Mawgu's interruption of the ceremony left Jimmy back in his lab. Jimmy also reveals that the Mawgu had created a rift in time and space above the volcano which is siphoning energy from Retroville, Bikini Bottom, Dimmsdale, and Amity Park, to power himself; if this continues for too long, it will suck up their worlds and destroy the multiverse.

Using Jimmy's blueprints, Tucker sends the rest of the heroes to collect parts for a Rift Zipper, to seal the rift and stop the Mawgu. Once completed, the eight heroes enter the volcano and travel up into the rift, where the Mawgu awaits them. Sam, Tucker, Sandy, Timmy and Patrick keep the Mawgu busy while Danny, SpongeBob and Squidward ascend using the debris sucked in from the other worlds to the rift's core. The device drains the Mawgu of his strength, allowing the closing rift to seal him away forever. After being congratulated by the Wise Old Crab and the denizens of Volcano Island, the heroes then depart through a portal opened by Jimmy, sending them back to their rightful worlds.

== Reception ==
Reception

Aggregate score
Aggregator	Score
Metacritic	59/100 (PS2/NDS); 69/100 (GBA)

Review scores
Publication	Score
GamesMaster	4.8/10
GameZone	6.3/10 (NDS); 5.9/10 (PS2); 6/10 (GBA)
IGN	5.5/10 (NDS); 4.2/10 (PS2/NGC); 7/10 (GBA)
PlayStation Official Magazine – UK	6/10

The game was given mixed reviews. Metacritic gave the PlayStation 2 version 59%, the Game Boy Advance version 69%, and the DS version 59%.

== Sequel ==
The game was followed by Nicktoons: Attack of the Toybots a year later for the Game Boy Advance, Nintendo DS, PlayStation 2 and Wii on October 23, 2007.
