= Heavy Iron Studios =

American video game developer

Heavy Iron Studios, Inc.
- Type: Subsidiary
- Industry: Video games
- Predecessor: Chemistry Entertainment
- Founded: August 31, 1999; 26 years ago
- Headquarters: Manhattan Beach, California, US
- Key people: Lyle Hall (president, CEO)
- Products: See § Games developed
- Number of employees: 43 (2020)
- Parent: THQ (1999–2009); Keywords Studios (2021–present)
- Website: heavyiron.games

Heavy Iron Studios, Inc. is an American video game developer based in Manhattan Beach, California. It was founded in August 1999 within THQ after the publisher acquired Steve Gray's Chemistry Entertainment. As part of a series of cost reductions within THQ, Heavy Iron Studios was spun off as an independent company in June 2009. Keywords Studios acquired the developer in January 2021.

== History ==
Early during his career, Steve Gray worked for the visual effects companies Robert Abel and Associates, Rhythm & Hues, and Digital Domain. As Digital Domain was trying to get into the video game industry, Gray and the company's chief financial officer, Chris McKibbin, pitched their services to various larger video game companies. Although they were turned down due to Digital Domain's lack of experience in the field, Gray and McKibbin were offered positions at the game developer, EA Canada, which both accepted. Gray quickly discovered his dislike the studio's sports games and soon switched to Square USA, where he managed the development team for Parasite Eve. As the game was completed, Gray and several of the game's developers believed they could easily obtain publishing contracts from outside companies if they set up their own studio. In 1997, Gray established Chemistry Entertainment. The studio worked on several unreleased games, including a Godzilla game for Electronic Arts. Chemistry Entertainment was briefly part of Rainmaker Entertainment Group, which also housed Rainmaker Digital Effects, as Rainmaker Interactive. Eventually, the studio landed a deal with THQ for a game based on the Evil Dead franchise. Gray sold his studio to THQ, which then established Heavy Iron Studios as an internal developer on August 31, 1999. The finished game, Evil Dead: Hail to the King, was released in late 2000.

Following significant financial losses at THQ, the company announced that it would spin off several of its developers, including Heavy Iron Studios. The studio's independence was effective on June 1, 2009. Through a series of layoffs, its headcount was reduced from 120 to 60 by December. In September 2020, Keywords Studios announced that it had agreed to acquire Heavy Iron Studios with its 43 employees for US$13.3 million. The acquisition was complete on January 13, 2021.

== Games developed ==
Year released	Title	Platform(s)
2000	Evil Dead: Hail to the King	Microsoft Windows, Dreamcast, PlayStation
2002	Scooby-Doo! Night of 100 Frights	Xbox, PlayStation 2, GameCube
2003	SpongeBob SquarePants: Battle for Bikini Bottom	Xbox, PlayStation 2, GameCube
2004	The SpongeBob SquarePants Movie	Xbox, PlayStation 2, GameCube
2004	The Incredibles	Xbox, PlayStation 2, GameCube, Microsoft Windows, Mac OS X
2005	The Incredibles: Rise of the Underminer	Xbox, PlayStation 2, GameCube, Microsoft Windows, Mac OS X
2007	Ratatouille	Xbox 360, PlayStation 3
2008	WALL-E	Xbox 360, PlayStation 3, Wii
2009	Up	Xbox 360, PlayStation 3, Wii
2009	SpongeBob's Truth or Square	Xbox 360, Wii
2011	UFC Personal Trainer	Xbox 360, PlayStation 3, Wii
2012	Harley Pasternak's Hollywood Workout	Xbox 360, Wii
2012	Family Guy: Back to the Multiverse	Microsoft Windows, Xbox 360, PlayStation 3
2015	Fat City	Microsoft Windows, PlayStation 4, Xbox One, Wii U, OS X, PlayStation Vita, PlayStation VR, iOS, Android, Nintendo Switch
2017	Amazon Odyssey	Microsoft Windows (Requires HTC Vive)
2020	Pac-Man Mega Tunnel Battle	Stadia

== Games co-developed ==
Year released	Title	Platform(s)
2007	Ratatouille	Microsoft Windows, Mac OS X, Xbox, PlayStation 2, GameCube, Wii
2008	WALL-E	Microsoft Windows, Mac OS X, PlayStation 2, PlayStation Portable
2009	Up	Microsoft Windows, Mac OS X, PlayStation 2, PlayStation Portable
2012	Epic Mickey 2: The Power of Two	Wii U
2013	Disney Infinity	Microsoft Windows, Wii U, Wii, iOS
2014	South Park: The Stick of Truth	Microsoft Windows, Xbox 360, PlayStation 3, Xbox One, PlayStation 4, Nintendo Switch
2014	Disney Infinity 2.0: Marvel Super Heroes	Microsoft Windows, Wii U, iOS, Android
2015	Disney Infinity 3.0	Microsoft Windows, Wii U, iOS, Android
2016	Call of Duty: Infinite Warfare	Microsoft Windows, Xbox One, PlayStation 4
2016	The Martian VR Experience	Microsoft Windows (Requires either HTC Vive or Oculus Rift), PlayStation VR
2017	Call of Duty: WWII	Microsoft Windows, Xbox One, PlayStation 4
2017	Road Rage	Microsoft Windows, Xbox One, PlayStation 4
2017	Dreadnought	Microsoft Windows, PlayStation 4
2018	Ocean Casino	iOS, Android
2018	H1Z1	Microsoft Windows, PlayStation 4
2018	Star Wars: Jedi Challenges	iOS, Android
2019	The Grand Tour Game	Xbox One, PlayStation 4
2020	Marvel's Avengers	Microsoft Windows, Xbox One, PlayStation 4, Xbox Series X/S, PlayStation 5, Stadia
2020	Crash Bandicoot 4: It's About Time	Microsoft Windows, Xbox One, PlayStation 4, Xbox Series X/S, PlayStation 5, Nintendo Switch
2020	Call of Duty: Black Ops Cold War	Microsoft Windows, Xbox One, PlayStation 4, Xbox Series X/S, PlayStation 5
2021	Call of Duty: Vanguard	Microsoft Windows, Xbox One, PlayStation 4, Xbox Series X/S, PlayStation 5
2022	Call of Duty: Warzone	Microsoft Windows, Xbox One, PlayStation 4, Xbox Series X/S, PlayStation 5
2023	Call of Duty: Modern Warfare III	Microsoft Windows, Xbox One, PlayStation 4, Xbox Series X/S, PlayStation 5
2024	Call of Duty: Black Ops 6	Microsoft Windows, Xbox One, PlayStation 4, Xbox Series X/S, PlayStation 5
2025	Avowed	Microsoft Windows, Xbox Series X/S

== Cancelled games ==
Year	Title	Platform(s)	Notes
2000	Scooby-Doo! Night of 100 Frights	PlayStation	Early version of the game with a different plot and gameplay style.
2007	Toy Story 3	Xbox 360, PlayStation 3, Wii	Early rejected version. Final game was developed by Avalanche Software.
2008	SpongeBob SquarePants: Happiness Squared	PlayStation 2, Wii	Altered and retooled into SpongeBob's Truth or Square.
2010	Saints Row: The Cooler	Xbox 360, PlayStation 3	Fighting game spin-off of the Saints Row series that required the Kinect/PlayStation Move.
2010	Disney’s E-Ticket	Xbox 360	Early rejected version of what eventually became Kinect: Disneyland Adventures, developed by Frontier Developments.
2010	Family Guy: Road to Death	Xbox 360, PlayStation 3	Altered and retooled into Family Guy: Back to the Multiverse.
2011	Family Guy: Back to the Multiverse	Wii, Nintendo 3DS	Alternative versions of the game for Nintendo consoles with a different gameplay style.
