= SpongeBob SquarePants: SuperSponge =

2001 video game

- North American PlayStation box art
- Developer: Climax Group
- Publisher: THQ
- Composer: Matt Simmonds
- Series: SpongeBob SquarePants
- Platforms: PlayStation, Game Boy Advance
- Release: PlayStation; NA: September 20, 2001; EU: November 16, 2001; Game Boy Advance; NA: November 6, 2001; EU: November 23, 2001
- Genre: Platform-adventure
- Mode: Single-player

SpongeBob SquarePants: SuperSponge is a 2001 platform game based on the Nickelodeon animated television series SpongeBob SquarePants. Developed by Climax Development and published by THQ, it was released for the PlayStation on September 20, 2001, and for the Game Boy Advance on November 8, 2001.

In 2016, the source code and most of the development assets for the PlayStation version were sold on two DVDs, and the contents were released on the Internet Archive. Early source code for the Game Boy Advance version was later found and released in 2019.

== Gameplay ==
The game is divided into five worlds (listed as "chapters"): Bikini Bottom, The Center of the Earth (an underwater volcano), Prehistoric Bikini Bottom, Rock Bottom, and Industrial (the industrial district of Bikini Bottom). Each world is divided into four levels, which Barnacle Boy clears by collecting the desired object. In addition, the fourth level of every chapter has a boss enemy who must be defeated to progress.

Scattered through all the levels are spatulas. By collecting all 100 in a level, SpongeBob earns an extra life. In the PlayStation version, spatulas serve as Sonic the Hedgehog-style health measures for the player. If SpongeBob is touched by an enemy, he loses all of the collected spatulas, and if he is touched by an enemy without any spatulas, he loses a life. In the PlayStation version, there is a continue feature that shows Patrick alone at SpongeBob's house; he encourages the player to keep going on SpongeBob's quest by saying where his friends are and thinking they forgot his birthday. In the Game Boy Advance version, a separate health measure is used, which can be replenished by collecting items like Salty Fries, Salty Shakes, and Krabby Patties. Lives can also be obtained by finding underpants.

In the PlayStation version, by collecting a certain number of spatulas in every chapter, a secret level named "Six Clams Adventure Land" (a reference to the Six Flags amusement park) can be unlocked. In those levels, set in an amusement park, SpongeBob must ride through obstacles and collect all 25 flower tokens. These tokens can be used to buy props for Patrick's birthday party at the end of the game.

== Plot ==
It is Patrick's birthday, and SpongeBob wants to give him "the best present ever": a photo signed by his favourite superheroes, Mermaid Man and Barnacle Boy. However, the heroes want nothing more than to get rid of SpongeBob, so they send him to accomplish four tasks around Bikini Bottom. While searching for what the superheroes ask for, SpongeBob faces off against various bosses, including the Flying Dutchman. After returning from the fourth task, SpongeBob discovers that the television in Mermaid Man and Barnacle Boy's retirement home is broken, so he searches Bikini Bottom for repair tools. After finding the tools, SpongeBob returns to fix the television. Mermaid Man and Barnacle Boy, feeling grateful, finally give SpongeBob the autographs; however, the TV breaks again, angering the heroes. The game ends with Patrick thanking SpongeBob for the autographs and everyone wishing him a happy birthday.

== Development and re-releases ==
SpongeBob Squarepants: SuperSponge is the second SpongeBob game released on PlayStation, after Nicktoons Racing, which features SpongeBob as playable characters.

The Game Boy Advance version was later re-released on a Twin Pack cartridge bundled with SpongeBob SquarePants: Revenge of the Flying Dutchman, and a Triple Pack cartridge bundled with Tak and the Power of Juju and Rugrats: I Gotta Go Party in 2005.

== Reception and sales ==
Reception

Aggregate score
Aggregator	Score
GameRankings	(GBA): 67.83% (PS): 68%

Review scores
Publication	Score
4Players	(PS): 43%
AllGame	(GBA): 2.5/5 (PS): 2.5/5
Jeuxvideo.com	(GBA): 10/20
M! Games	(PS): 36%
Nintendo Power	(GBA): 2.4/5
Official U.S. PlayStation Magazine	(PS): 2/5

SpongeBob SquarePants: SuperSponge received mixed reviews since its release. The PlayStation's version received a 68% and the Game Boy Advance version a 67.83% on GameRankings. The PlayStation version of SuperSponge sold 1.06 million copies, becoming one of the console's best-selling games. The game was later reissued for PlayStation as a Greatest Hits title.

Reviewing the Game Boy Advance version of the game, Nintendo Power's five reviewers gave it mixed scores, with an average rating of 2.5 out of 5 stars, describing it as "basic".

== Legacy ==
In 2016, the complete source code and much of the game's development assets were sold on two DVDs, with the contents later uploaded and released on the Internet Archive in November 2016. Notably, the developmental assets contained drawings of SpongeBob characters engaging in explicit behaviour. Similarly, partial source code for the Game Boy Advance version of the game was also located and uploaded to the Internet Archive in December 2019.
