= SpongeBob SquarePants: Revenge of the Flying Dutchman =

2002 video game

- North American PlayStation 2 box art
- Developers: BigSky Interactive, Inc. (PS2, GC); Vicarious Visions (GBA)
- Publisher: THQ
- Directors: Vasken N. Sayre (PS2, GC); Jonathan Russell (GBA)
- Producers: Billy Joe Cain (PS2, GC); Di Davies (GBA)
- Designers: Vasken N. Sayre; Jeremy Arntson (PS2, GC); Jonathan Russell (GBA)
- Programmers: Mike Bowman; Waylon Calabrese; Paul Hyman; Jim McHugh (PS2, GC)
- Artists: Matt Scibilia; Grant Pimpler (PS2, GC)
- Composers: George Oldziey (PS2, GC); Martin Schioeler (GBA)
- Series: SpongeBob SquarePants
- Platforms: PlayStation 2, GameCube, Game Boy Advance
- Release: Game Boy Advance; NA: September 12, 2002; EU: March 14, 2003; PlayStation 2; NA: November 21, 2002; EU: March 14, 2003; GameCube; NA: December 17, 2002; EU: March 14, 2003
- Genres: Platform, action-adventure
- Mode: Single-player

SpongeBob SquarePants: Revenge of the Flying Dutchman is a 2002 platform game based on the animated series SpongeBob SquarePants, developed by Vicarious Visions and BigSky Interactive, Inc. and published by THQ for the GameCube and PlayStation 2, and Game Boy Advance. It was the last game to be developed by BigSky Interactive, Inc. The game was released in North America in late 2002, while in Europe it was released in early 2003. The Game Boy Advance version was also released on a Twin Pack cartridge bundled with SpongeBob SquarePants: SuperSponge in 2005.

== Gameplay ==
The home console versions consist of 3D platform gameplay. Playing as SpongeBob, the player gains several abilities throughout the game that are needed to progress. The player can alternate between abilities by entering tents set up in each level. Throughout each level, the player must locate and collect letter tiles. After each level is completed, the player must solve a sliding puzzle that forms a picture of where to locate the next treasure, each time that happens SpongeBob has a diving rod that would let him know if he (and the player) is close.

The Game Boy Advance version is a side-scrolling platform game with five worlds: SpongeBob's Home, Jellyfish Fields, Sandy's Treedome, the Krusty Krab, Doubloon Bonus World, and a final world on The Flying Dutchman's ship. All levels have SpongeBob looking for the ten treasures (which are unlocked with three keys) and doubloons. Upon completing the game, the player can replay all the levels to go back for what they missed.

== Plot ==
=== Home console version ===
A screenshot of the Jellyfish Fields level in the home console version

One day, SpongeBob wakes up and begins playing fetch with Gary, leading the snail to dig up a treasure chest. SpongeBob opens the chest and finds a bottle, which, upon rubbing it, scatters doubloons all over Bikini Bottom and releases The Flying Dutchman. The Dutchman tells SpongeBob that he will take Gary to work on his ship for all eternity for disturbing his rest. After briefly leaving to check on his ship, he makes good on this promise.

SpongeBob travels across seven locations to recover letter tiles; there are nine in each, which spell out his name, and each set leads to a treasure. These treasures, as explained by one of Squidward's books on "How to Defeat Evil Spirits", are personal possessions from when the Dutchman was alive, which can apparently weaken him. According to the book, collecting all seven will make SpongeBob immune to the Dutchman's hypnotizing spell, allowing him to put up a fight to save Bikini Bottom.

To collect the tiles, SpongeBob must complete a wide assortment of challenges and missions for other characters, such as delivering food for Mr. Krabs in Downtown Bikini Bottom, fixing Patrick's TV antenna, helping Sandy rid her treedome of bees and wasps after giving her a beehive (that he mistakes for an acorn) as a gift, winning a jellyfishing contest, beating all the games at Plankton's new amusement park "Chum World", and defeating Larry the Lobster and Sandy in karate matches.

As SpongeBob becomes increasingly impervious to the Dutchman's power, the Dutchman – satisfied with Gary's hard work, unlike that of his old crew – hypnotizes and kidnaps his other friends and terrorizes Bikini Bottom. The Dutchman attacks SpongeBob in his house by dropping heavy objects from his ship. Firing himself out of a cannon dropped by the Dutchman, SpongeBob winds up in the Dutchman's graveyard, where he exchanges doubloons with the Dutchman's disgruntled pirates for the use of their cannons and collects the seventh and final treasure.

Believing himself to now be immune to the Dutchman, SpongeBob boards the Dutchman's ship and rescues his friends but is confronted by the Dutchman. His cockiness is crushed by the omniscient narrator, who informs him that Squidward's book was out-of-date and that the new edition explains he is mostly immune to the Dutchman's magic, but not completely; while he is immune to the hypnosis spell, he is not immune to getting hurt. He fights the Dutchman anyway, and he sucks the Dutchman back into his bottle. Afterward, as the Dutchman's ship catches fire, SpongeBob escapes with his friends on a flying boat to celebrate at the Krusty Krab.

=== Game Boy Advance version ===
SpongeBob SquarePants is giving Gary a walk through Jellyfish Fields; Gary then smells Kelp Nip and runs off. After SpongeBob finds Gary, he finds a chest, opens it and finds a bottle. SpongeBob then opens the bottle and the Flying Dutchman appears. After SpongeBob mistakes the Dutchman for a genie that will grant him a wish, he tells SpongeBob to find his ten treasures and doubloons that got scattered around Bikini Bottom. SpongeBob does so, but the Dutchman ultimately abducts Gary, Patrick, Sandy, Mr. Krabs, and Squidward. After SpongeBob finds all of his friends on the Dutchman's ship, he battles the Dutchman himself. After the Dutchman is defeated, the player is given a list of wishes to choose from, each one depicting a screenshot of said wish. One of them involves giving SpongeBob his own TV show; when that one is chosen, a screenshot of the show's original logo appears.

== Reception ==
Reception

Aggregate scores
Aggregator	Score		
Aggregator	GBA	GameCube	PS2
GameRankings	75%	72%	53%
Metacritic	71/100	66/100	N/A

Review scores
Publication	Score		
Publication	GBA	GameCube	PS2
G4	6/10	N/A	N/A
GameZone	7.3/10	7.5/10	N/A
IGN	N/A	N/A	4/10
Nintendo Power	7.2/10	N/A	N/A
Nintendo World Report	N/A	6.5/10	N/A

On Metacritic, the GameCube version holds a score of 66 out of 100, while the Game Boy Advance version holds a score of 71, both indicating "mixed or average reviews". The GameCube version has a 72% rating on GameRankings, while the Game Boy Advance version has 75% on GameRankings. The PlayStation 2 version was met with a mostly negative reception due to a glitch that causes the game to freeze while loading. It has a 53% rating on GameRankings.

Anise Hollingshead of GameZone wrote a favorable review of the GameCube version; she praised the use of a checklist, saying it was "motivating and keeps players on track." However, Hollingshead criticized the game's crude background designs and concluded that while it was a "great game" for children, "Older fans of SpongeBob may want to just rent." Steven Hopper of GameZone wrote a generally positive review of the Game Boy Advance version, calling it an excellent game for young children that could also appeal to people of all ages who were fans of the television series. Ryan Jones of Nintendo World Report wrote a more mixed review of the GameCube version concluding: "The game has everything you could want if you are a huge SpongeBob fan, but the gameplay and graphics are far from perfect."

The game's frequent loading screens, featuring the same bubbles in the transitions from the animated series, were a subject of derision for reviewers.

Mark Ryan Sallee of IGN wrote a negative review of the PlayStation 2 version, criticizing it for its sluggish controls, annoying music tracks, Nintendo 64-style graphics, frequent and obnoxious loading screens, simplistic gameplay, somewhat tedious fetch quests, and the unnecessary use of a checklist (it made the game feel like a chore). Sallee ended his review saying: "...Yes, pre-school-aged kids will probably get a kick out of the game, though they'd likely be more entertained mowing down prostitutes in Grand Theft Auto." Play magazine also wrote a generally negative review, giving the game 2 out of 5 stars, citing its mediocre and sparse levels, bad models, and the fact that there are loading times where there should not be any.

The Game Boy Advance version sold an estimated 740,000 copies; in August 2006, the game was ranked at number 31 on Edge magazine's list of "The Century's Top 50 Handheld Games," arranged by the number of copies sold. Edge called it "yet another mediocre game that sold brilliantly because of the sponge on its cover," writing that: "Most major review outlets don't even cover these games as they know their opinion won't matter, and they're right – this game knew exactly where its audience was, and delivered right to them." Nintendo Power wrote a generally favorable review of the GBA version, citing the how: "Great graphics, goofy music and the entire kooky cast of the show add life of the deep-sea derring-do." G4 likewise called it: "A great example of how to translate an existing property into a videogame". The game won the 2003 Nickelodeon Kids' Choice Awards in the category Favorite Video Game.
