= Nicktoons: Freeze Frame Frenzy =

2004 video game

- North American cover art
- Developer: Altron
- Publisher: THQ
- Director: Yusuke Sato
- Producer: Yusuke Sato
- Programmers: Masahiro Horiguchi; Yoshio Umemoto
- Artists: Yusuke Sato; Yuhei Fujita; Yotaro Doi; Hidekazu Komori; Marika Tanimoto
- Composer: Tomoyoshi Sato
- Platform: Game Boy Advance
- Release: NA: September 27, 2004; EU: November 26, 2004
- Genre: Photography
- Mode: Single-player

Nicktoons: Freeze Frame Frenzy (also known as SpongeBob SquarePants and Friends in Freeze Frame Frenzy in PAL regions) is a video game for the Game Boy Advance based on various Nicktoons. The game was released for the Game Boy Advance in 2004. The gameplay is similar to that of Gekibo: Gekisha Boy, a PC Engine game about a photographer with cartoony graphics. A prototype of the cancelled PlayStation 2 version of the game, under the working title Nicktoons: Snap Shot, was discovered in 2021.

== Story ==
Characters from many Nickelodeon worlds have been misplaced into each other's worlds. Jimmy Neutron's mission is to fix the situation. He sends out Danny Phantom, Arnold Shortman, SpongeBob SquarePants, Tommy Pickles, Otto Rocket, and Timmy Turner to take photos of the misplaced characters with his new invention, the "Neutrino-Cam 4000", a camera that also functions as a teleporter, which will send them back to their own worlds.

As the player progresses, it becomes clear that Zim is the mastermind behind the whole mess, and Jimmy soon realizes that after the player has cleared all the levels. Jimmy flies off in his rocket to Zim's ship and stops the Irken's scheme. After taking a group photo, Zim works on his new plan to take over the world.

== Gameplay ==
In each level, the player has to meet a certain number of set points in order to progress. This is achieved by: photographing a certain number of out-of-place characters, photographing level-specific characters, photographing a certain number of characters intended for a specific universe (usually six), and photographing six of a certain paraphernalia within the level (i.e. jellyfish in Bikini Bottom).

The player does not necessarily have to accomplish all of these goals, but it is recommended that they focus mainly on photographing the misplaced characters; photographing and transporting these characters is worth 1,000 points each, while everything else is worth 10. However, the player gets bonus points if they clear the other objectives in addition.

Throughout the levels, the player's camera can be damaged by mechanical bolts rolling about on the ground, however the character can take a picture of it to dispose of it. If the bolt reaches the player, the characters themselves do not take damage from these (but bounce back), but ironically enough, the camera will, and should its energy meter be completely drained, it will break and Jimmy Neutron will have to repair it while the player is given the option to continue. The player will also fail a level if they are unable to reach the required goal score for that level.

At the end of each world, the character will face off with a robot boss built to resemble another character. In order to defeat the boss, the player will need to take photos of it several times, stunning them on the first camera flash and then delivering a blow with another flash. During the boss battles, the bosses will fling mechanical bolts which cause as much damage as the ones in the regular levels. Before each boss battle, the player's character and the boss will engage in a conversation that is different depending on which character the player is using. The conversation becomes lengthier if the player uses a character from the same show as the character whom the robot's appearance is based on.

== Reception ==
Reception

Aggregate score
Aggregator	Score
Metacritic	53/100

The game has received mixed to average reviews.
