= SpongeBob's Truth or Square (video game) =

2009 video game

- North American Xbox 360 cover
- Developers: Heavy Iron Studios (X360, Wii); Barking Lizards Technologies (PSP); Altron (DS)
- Publisher: THQ
- Director: Kirk Tome
- Producer: Diana Wu
- Designers: Brian McInerny; Scott Compton; Matt Ekins
- Programmer: Mark Price
- Artists: Dorothy Chen; Sean Ho; Robert Rose; St. John Colon
- Writer: Mr. Lawrence
- Composers: Steve Belfer; Sage Guyton; Jeremy Wakefield; The Blue Hawaiians; Jimmy Levine; Robert Crew; Alex Wilkinson; John O'Kennedy; Barry Fasman; Beth Ertz (Wii, X360, PSP); Tomoyoshi Sato (DS)
- Series: SpongeBob SquarePants
- Platforms: Wii, Nintendo DS, PlayStation Portable, Xbox 360
- Release: NA: October 26, 2009; EU: September 17, 2010
- Genres: Platform, Action-adventure
- Modes: Single-player, multiplayer

SpongeBob's Truth or Square is a 2009 video game based on the 10th SpongeBob SquarePants anniversary episode with the same title. It was released on October 26, 2009, for the Xbox 360, Wii, Nintendo DS and the PlayStation Portable. The game is developed by Heavy Iron Studios. Altron developed a Nintendo DS version of the game.

On November 15, 2021, the Xbox 360 version of the game was made backwards compatible on the Xbox One and Xbox Series X and Series S.

== Plot ==
While preparing to host a party honoring the "eleventy-seventh" anniversary of the Krusty Krab at his home (and on his own pay), SpongeBob has been entrusted by Mr. Krabs to keep the Krabby Patty formula safe. But two hours later, in all the excitement, SpongeBob forgets where he put the formula. Panicking, Spongebob slowly feels his happiness going away, which he tells Patrick it means he can't remember anything while sad. Plankton, overhearing, feigns sympathy and offers to help Spongebob find the formula. Believing Plankton, Spongebob accepts, going to the Chum Bucket later that night and straps to a machine. Little does SpongeBob know, however, that Plankton wants the formula for himself and has inserted shrunken robots into SpongeBob's memories to extract the precise location of the formula. But before Plankton could press the ON button for the controller, Spongebob fidgets, startling Plankton into dropping and breaking the remote. With the robots haywire, Plankton has no choice but to go inside SpongeBob's memories instead.

Inside, Plankton is in Spongebob's dream, which is the eleventy-seventh anniversary party the next day. Spongebob, unaware, begins talking to Patrick, and Patrick tried to cheer Spongebob up by reminding him the time they went jellyfishing. Inside the memory, Spongebob notices the haywire robots, but Plankton dismisses it, saying he didn't notice them due to all the fun he had. Defeating the robots and reaching the end of the memory allows Spongebob to collect a Happiness Object, a memento of the memory. Back at the party, Spongebob doesn't think he's happy enough to remember the formula location, so Sandy tries to cheer him up by reminding him the day they met (in the PSP version, Squidward, agreeing to help since Spongebob is more annoying sad, reminds Spongebob the talent show he arranged) Afterwards, Patrick reminds Spongebob the day they staged a fight to get into the Salty Spittoon, but Patrick is replaced by a giant Pat-Bot in the memory. Despite still having no memory of the formula's location, touched by his friends efforts, he is encouraged to try to be happy again.

Spongebob soon travels to more various environments as he relives his memories, such as getting his job as fry-cook, his first Christmas, jellyfishing with Patrick, meeting Mermaidman and Barnacleboy, Squidward's first Krabby Patty (where he fights Squid-Bot), his first 24-hour shift (where he is lost in Rock Bottom), and doing Karate with Sandy. Happy enough, he tells Patrick he believes the formula is in the Krusty Krab, before narrowing it down to the safe (since Mr. Krabs told him to put it somewhere "safe"). Waking up, Spongebob says his realization out loud in relief. Plankton hears this, however, and turns the entire Chum Bucket into one giant Plankton-Bot. However, during deployment, the antenna accidentally set the targeting system from the Krusty Krab to Bikini Bottom. Spongebob is ejected and forced to fight it as the Plankton-Bot wreaks havoc on the streets, fighting normal-sized robots along the way, before Plankton can regain the robot's controls.

After defeating Plankton, SpongeBob runs into Mr. Krabs, who was wondering why Spongebob wasn't preparing for the party the next day. Spongebob explains how he thought he lost the formula, but he was able to remember that the formula is in the safe. Unfortunately, they find the safe empty and the formula still missing. Panicking once again, Spongebob quickly discovers he never took it out of his back pocket the whole time. However, when he gives the paper to Mr. Krabs, he realizes that he gave him his lottery ticket and that the secret formula was in Mr. Krabs' back pocket the whole time, making SpongeBob babble in confusion, realizing that SpongeBob went through it all for nothing. Plankton overhears this, and also vents his frustration over ten years of failures, before tiredly deciding to try again tomorrow.

== Features ==
Players can turn SpongeBob into a Sledgehammer Smash to whack intruders, a WaterBob sponge to spew water, a giant spatula, a spinning blade (or a spinning pirate ship steering wheel), a MuscleBob BuffPants, or even an Explosive Cannon to aim and blast baddies. Players can reminisce through fan-favorite SpongeBob moments as the game draws upon "The 10 Happiest Moments of SpongeBob's Life" and story elements from the first and second seasons of the animated television series. In multiplayer mode, players can play as SpongeBob or with a friend playing as Plankton throughout the entire game on both the Wii and Xbox 360 platforms. Each system's cover art has a SpongeBob face. However, the facial expression shown is different between covers. Two levels are exclusive to the PSP and DS versions, Bikini Bottom and The Krusty Krab.

== Reception ==
SpongeBob's Truth or Square received generally mixed reviews. Corey Cohen of Official Xbox Magazine rated the game 4 out of 10 and considered it boring, while criticizing its "tedious" levels and "irritating" camera. Common Sense Media gave it a score of 4 out of 5 stars.
