= SpongeBob SquarePants: Employee of the Month =

2002 video game

- Artwork of the game released only for North America
- Developer: AWE Games
- Publisher: THQ
- Designer: Scott Nixon
- Composers: Joe Abbati; Will Pirkle
- Series: SpongeBob SquarePants
- Platform: Microsoft Windows
- Release: NA: September 20, 2002
- Genre: Point-and-click
- Mode: Single-player

SpongeBob SquarePants: Employee of the Month is a 2002 point-and-click adventure video game developed by AWE Games and published by THQ for Microsoft Windows. It is based on the television show SpongeBob SquarePants, which premiered on Nickelodeon in 1999.

The story focuses on SpongeBob SquarePants receiving two tickets to Neptune's Paradise, a theme park, but many unexpected things happen along the way.

== Gameplay ==
Employee of the Month is a point-and-click adventure game in which the player controls SpongeBob SquarePants. Gameplay consists of the player accomplishing various tasks and collecting items for citizens of Bikini Bottom. A treasure chest acts as an inventory for the player's items, which frequently must be combined to proceed forward. The player can also access a map of the current chapter. Animated cutscenes begin and end each level, and subsequently become available for viewing on the game's main menu. Several videotapes are hidden throughout the game; locating them unlocks special footage of the game's development.

== Story ==
The story focuses on SpongeBob "winning" two tickets to Neptune's Paradise, a theme park. But along the way many unexpected things happen, such as a storm hitting while on the bus to Neptune's Paradise and sending them into Rock Bottom.

Chapter 1: Employee of the Year After receiving the tickets to Neptune's Paradise, SpongeBob first serves a Krabby Patty for a grumpy customer and then is informed by the customer how to get to the park; to take a bus there. After his shift at the Krusty Krab is over, SpongeBob heads downtown where he meets Patrick to board the bus. Unfortunately, SpongeBob does not have money for bus tokens. SpongeBob goes to Goo Lagoon, the local beach, to find the Flying Dutchman's buried treasure to pay for tokens. After SpongeBob completes a series of tasks for various characters, he finds the Flying Dutchman's treasure, which is a chest entirely full of bus tokens. After SpongeBob completes several more tasks in order to convince a bus driver to agree to take them, he and Patrick depart for Neptune's Paradise.

Chapter 2: Hitting Rock Bottom SpongeBob and Patrick end up in Rock Bottom due to heavy rain, and the bus driver gets upset with SpongeBob and Patrick for getting him trapped there. He refuses to help SpongeBob any further until the weather clears up and SpongeBob gets left on his own. SpongeBob eventually learns that the rainstorm is being caused by Marlin the wizard, who is upset at a local weatherman for wanting to build a machine that can control the weather. Marlin feels threatened by the machine since controlling the weather is his job. After SpongeBob and Patrick destroy the weather machine, Marlin stops the rain and the pair continue their travel to Neptune's Paradise. However, the bus driver gets irritated more than he can handle with SpongeBob and Patrick's childish antics and eventually tricks them into getting off the bus back in Bikini Bottom before he drives away.

Chapter 3: Back to Square One Just as SpongeBob was about to give up, Patrick remembers that Sandy was building a rocket inside her treedome that can take them to Neptune's Paradise. SpongeBob tackles numerous challenges so as to prepare for the flight. SpongeBob needs his water helmet to enter Sandy's treedome. When he finds a sea snake in the helmet, he decides to use Squidward's clarinet to lure it out. However, Squidward is in a deep sleep, so SpongeBob uses a pair of Dream Glasses from Sardine's Sundries to enter his dreams, where he is partially transformed into Squidward himself. SpongeBob convinces Squidward to give him the clarinet, which SpongeBob uses to retrieve his water helmet from the sea snake. The gang then sets off again for Neptune's Paradise, but unbeknownst to them, Patrick accidentally breaks the oxygen pipe before the rocket tanks are completely filled.

Chapter 4: Bottoms Up! Sandy's rocket crashes in the affluent town of Bottoms Up. SpongeBob searches for oxygen fuel for the rocket. Sandy sends SpongeBob to get oxygen at Oxygen Springs Resort and Spa where the geyser hot-tubs use bubbles of oxygen. SpongeBob is denied access to the spring because he is not wearing a jacket. He sets off to find a jacket. Patrick searches for a bathroom after eating junk food. SpongeBob travels to a small wealthy city, Waverly Hills, to a fancy seafood restaurant inside a shipwreck. SpongeBob is loaned a jacket at the restaurant but is kicked out when he accidentally reveals that he is from Bikini Bottom. The waiter forgets to take back the jacket. After getting into the Springs and refilling the oxygen tanks, they leave for Neptune's Paradise.

Finale The gang finally gets to Neptune's Paradise, but an employee tells them that the park is closed for a private party. SpongeBob and Patrick show their tickets, but the employee reveals the tickets are for next week, which saddens the pair; however, the employee also reveals that it is their party, and they are allowed to enter. Inside the park, they meet all of the characters they met along the way, who seemed to have planned this for SpongeBob. They all then enjoy the rides and attractions.

== Release ==
The game was released in North America on September 22, 2002, and in the UK on February 7, 2003. Focus Multimedia later re-published the game in the UK as part of their "PC Fun Club" range which also includes other SpongeBob SquarePants games.

== Reception ==
Tom King of Adventure Gamers rated the game 3 out of 5, and praised its fun gameplay and colorful graphics, but also called it, "Very easy, and extremely short." King wrote, "The replay value is moderate to low; it took some 3.5 hours for me to complete, and although the game is certainly fun enough to play more than once, you're not going to see anything different. Were this game just a little longer, I would add a half-star to the score."

The editors of Computer Gaming World nominated SpongeBob SquarePants: Employee of the Month for their 2003 "Adventure Game of the Year" award, which ultimately went to Uplink: Hacker Elite. During the 6th Annual Interactive Achievement Awards, the Academy of Interactive Arts & Sciences nominated Employee of the Month for "Family Game of the Year", which was ultimately awarded to Mario Party 4.
