= List of roles and awards of Tom Kenny =

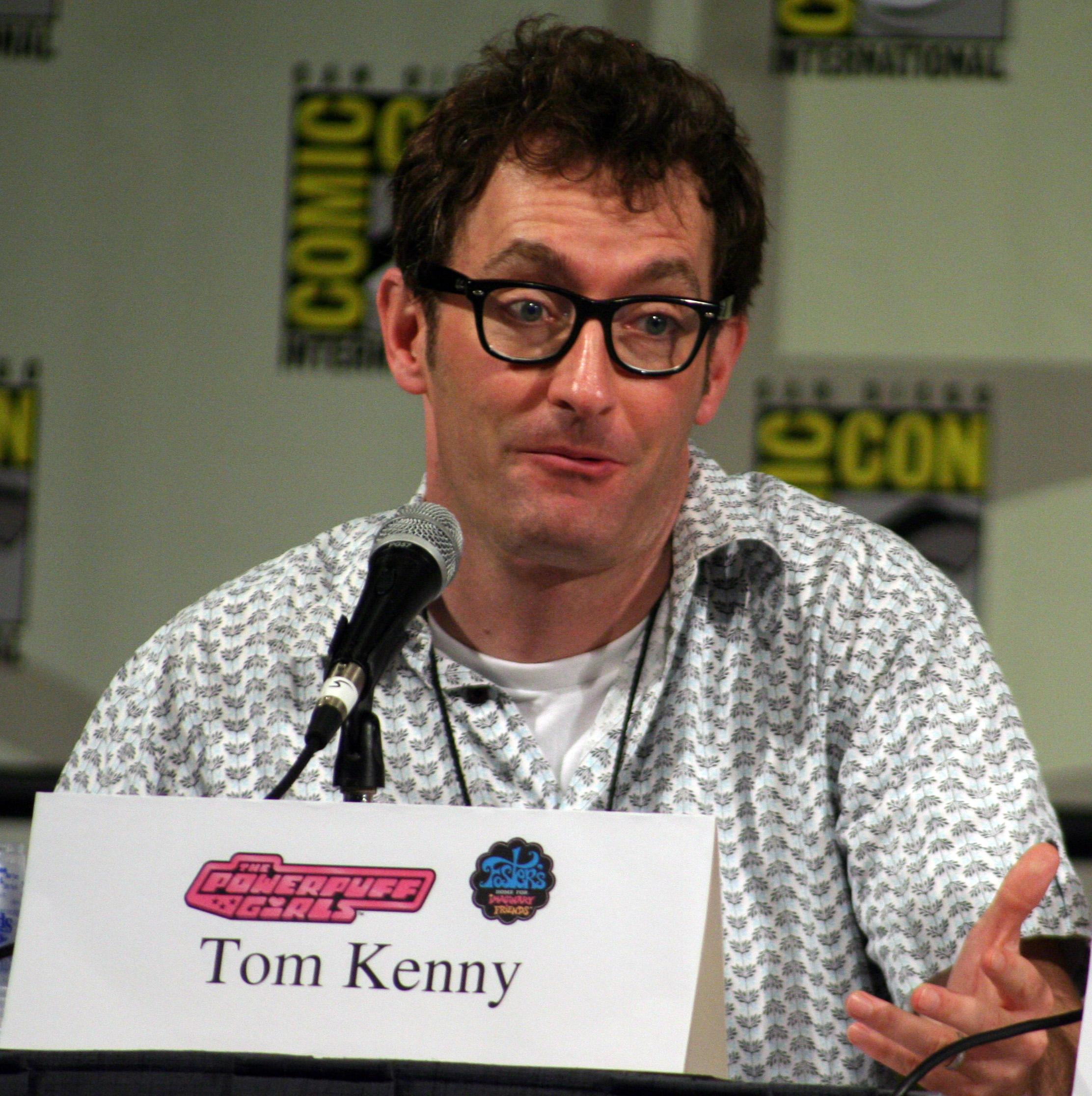
Kenny at the 2008 San Diego Comic-Con

American actor and comedian Tom Kenny has received many awards and nominations for his work in film, television, and video games. He is known for voicing the title character in the SpongeBob SquarePants franchise. In addition, Kenny has voiced many other characters in the series, including Gary the Snail, the French Narrator, and his live action portrayal as Patchy the Pirate whom Patchy was featured in various other appearances from the episodes "Christmas Who?" (2000) to "SpongeBob's Road to Christmas" (2021). His other roles include Heffer Wolfe in Rocko's Modern Life; Simon Petrikov / The Ice King in the Adventure Time franchise; the Narrator and Mayor in The Powerpuff Girls; Carl Chryniszzswics and Brother Ernie in Johnny Bravo; Dog and Cliff in CatDog; Hank and Jeremy in Talking Tom & Friends; Squanchy and Gene Gilligan in Rick and Morty; and Spyro from the Spyro the Dragon video game series. His live-action work includes the comedy variety shows The Edge and Mr. Show. He currently voices Hanna-Barbera characters such as Augie Doggie, Top Cat, Hardy Har Har, Ding-A-Ling Wolf, Undercover Elephant and Ricochet Rabbit.

Kenny has won two Daytime Emmy Awards and two Annie Awards for his voice work as SpongeBob SquarePants and the Ice King. Along with being nominated for over 30 Behind the Voice Actor Awards, winning voice actor of the year in 2016. Kenny often collaborates with his wife Jill Talley, who plays Karen on the aforementioned series.

== Voice acting roles ==
=== Animation ===
List of voice performances in animation
Year	Series	Role	Notes	Source
1993–96	Rocko's Modern Life	Heffer Wolfe, various voices		
1995	What a Cartoon!	Godfrey, Lab Geek, Sherwood, Man		
1995	Dr. Katz, Professional Therapist	Tom		
1995	Dumb and Dumber	Various characters		
1996–2003	Dexter's Laboratory	Valhallen, various characters		
1997–2004	Johnny Bravo	Carl Chryniszzswics, Brother Ernie, various characters		
1997–99	Cow and Chicken	Various characters		
1997–99	The Online Adventures of Ozzie The Elf	Various characters	TV special	
1998–99	I Am Weasel	Boo-Boo Bear, Doctor, Announcer, Timmy		
1998–99	Mad Jack the Pirate	Various characters		
1998–2005	CatDog	Dog, Cliff, others		
1998–2002	Oh Yeah! Cartoons	Various characters		
1998	The Wild Thornberrys	Joey	Episode: "Pat Joey"	
1998	Godzilla: The Series	N.I.G.E.L., Bill the Redneck Hunter, and other roles	2 episodes	
1998–2005	The Powerpuff Girls	Mayor of Townsville, Narrator, additional voices		
1999–2000	Dilbert	Asok, Ratbert, others		
1999–present	SpongeBob SquarePants	SpongeBob SquarePants, Gary, French Narrator, Patchy the Pirate, Jellyfish, others	Also voice director (season 9b-); Nominated – Annie Award for Outstanding Individual Achievement for Voice Acting by a Male Performer in an Animated Television Production (2001); Nominated – Annie Award for Outstanding Voice Acting in an Animated Television Production (2008); Annie Award for Outstanding Voice Acting in an Animated Television Production (2010); Emmy Award for Outstanding Performer in an Animated Program (2018 & 2020); Nominated – Emmy Award for Outstanding Performer in an Animated Program (2021); Nominated – Emmy Award for Outstanding Voice Directing for a Daytime Animated Series (2021); Nominated – Children's and Family Emmy Awards for Outstanding Voice Performance in an Animated Program (2022); Nominated – Children's and Family Emmy Awards for Outstanding Voice Performance in an Animated Program (2023)	
1999–present	Futurama	Yancy Fry, others		
1999–2002	Mission Hill	Wally Langford, others		
1999	Dexter's Laboratory: Ego Trip	Various characters		
2000	Harvey Birdman, Attorney at Law	Boo-Boo Bear, Elroy Jetson, Computer, Top Cat, Choo-Choo		
2001	The Zeta Project	Bogg	Episode: "Crime Waves"	
2001	The Flintstones: On the Rocks	Bowling Announcer, Bellboy, Mammoth Vendor, Bed Monkey	Television film	
2001	Horrible Histories	Jake	TV animation	
2001	Justice League	Search Leader	Episode: "Tabula Rasa"	
2001–02	What's with Andy?	Steve Rowgee Jr., Mayor Roth		
2001–04, 2017	Samurai Jack	Scaramouche, Chritchellite, others		
2001–04	The Cramp Twins	Wayne Cramp, others		
2001–2017	The Fairly OddParents	Cupid, others		
2002	Whatever Happened to... Robot Jones?	Cubik, T-shirt Kid, Cubers	Episode: "Cube Wars"	
2002	The Adventures of Jimmy Neutron: Boy Genius	Various characters		
2002	What's New, Scooby-Doo?	Various characters		
2002–08	Codename: Kids Next Door	Knightbrace, others		
2002–04	As Told by Ginger	Buzz Harris	3 episodes	
2003–04	Cartoon Monsoon	Various characters		
2003	The Grim Adventures of Billy & Mandy	Boo-Boo Bear, Wiggly, others		
2003	Stripperella	Special Agent 14, others		
2003	Home Movies	Additional voices	Episode: "Coffins and Cradles"	
2003	My Life as a Teenage Robot	Various characters		
2003	Duck Dodgers	Various characters		
2003	Abra-Catastrophe!	Cupid, Food Cart Guy, Fairy Sergeant, Another Kid	Television film	
2003	The Powerpuff Girls: 'Twas the Fight Before Christmas	Narrator, Elf, Little Boy	Television film	
2003, 2005	Teen Titans	Mumbo, Fixit	2 episodes	
2003–06	Xiaolin Showdown	Raimundo Pedrosa, Hannibal Roy Bean, Grand Master Dashi, additional voices		
2003–04	Crank Yankers	Larson Grier	Puppets	
2004	Dave the Barbarian	Pillage Master, Sweet Boy, Crystal Ball Narrator, Delivery Guy, Evil Lederhosen		
2004	Game Over	Glen, Arthur, Emcee, Cop		
2004	Megas XLR	Bot Wars Announcer, Alien, Dorky Fan, Auto Show Boy, Auto Show Onlooker		
2004	Rave Master	Griffon Kato		
2004	Brandy & Mr. Whiskers	Ed		
2004	As Told by Ginger: The Wedding Frame!	Buzz Harris	Released on video in US	
2004	Periwinkle Around the World	Periwinkle	Mini-series	
2004–06	Super Robot Monkey Team Hyperforce Go!	Gibson, various voices		
2004–08	The Batman	Penguin		
2004–09	Foster's Home for Imaginary Friends	Eduardo, others		
2005	Johnny Test	Dukey	Kids' WB Promo (2005)	
2005	Robot Chicken	Charlie Bucket, Walt Disney	2 episodes	
2005	Loonatics Unleashed	Gunnar the Conqueror	Episode: "Loonatics on Ice"	
2005	IGPX: Immortal Grand Prix	Benjamin Bright		
2005–06	The Fairly OddParents: Fairy Idol	Cupid, Fairy Newscaster, Government Agent, Bucky's Agent	TV special	
2005–07	A.T.O.M.	Mr. Lee, Spydah		
2005–08	Camp Lazlo	Scoutmaster Lumpus, Slinkman, others		
2005–08	My Gym Partner's a Monkey	Jake Spidermonkey, Henry Armadillo, others		
2006	Hi Hi Puffy AmiYumi	Maurice	Episode: "Jungle Prom"	
2006	Korgoth of Barbaria	Hargon, Henchman		
2006	Shorty McShorts' Shorts	Operator	Episode: "Dudley and Nestor Do Nothing"	
2006	The Emperor's Secret	Ville Itälä	English dub	
2006	Plastic Man in Puddle Trouble	Plastic Man	TV pilot short	
2006–07	Squirrel Boy	Leon		
2006–08	Class of 3000	Eddie, others		
2006–13	Handy Manny	Mr. Lopart, Pat, others		
2006–15	WordGirl	Dr. Two-Brains, TJ Botsford, Sheriff Warden Chalmers, others		
2007	SpongeBob's Atlantis SquarePantis	SpongeBob SquarePants, Gary, Patchy the Pirate	Television film	
2007	Grumpy Puppy: First Place Pup	Paxton J. Pig		
2007–08	Out of Jimmy's Head	Tux		
2007–09	Transformers: Animated	Starscream, Jetfire, Professor Isaac Sumdac, others		
2007–10	Chowder	Various characters		
2007–11	Back at the Barnyard	Various characters		
2008	Imagination Movers	Eddie the Monster, Farmhouse Mouse	Puppet	
2008–09	Betsy's Kindergarten Adventures	Carl O'Connor		
2008–09	Random! Cartoons	Bradwurst, Jerry	Episode: "Bradwurst"	
2008–11	Batman: The Brave and the Bold	Plastic Man, Deadshot, Mirror Master, 'Mazing Man, Babyface		
2009	Sit Down, Shut Up	Happy		
2009	The Powerpuff Girls Rule!!!	Mayor, Narrator, Dove	10th anniversary special	
2009	Wishology	Various characters		
2009	SpongeBob's Truth or Square	SpongeBob SquarePants, Gary, Patchy the Pirate, others	10th anniversary special	
2009–11	The Super Hero Squad Show	Iron Man, Captain America, Space Phantom, Sentinels, MODOK, others		
2010–18	Adventure Time	Simon Petrikov / The Ice King, others		
2010–13	Scooby-Doo! Mystery Incorporated	The Funky Phantom, The Chairman	Episode: "Mystery Solvers Club State Finals"	
2010	Lego Hero Factory	Daniel Rocka, Evo, Jetbug		
2010	Star Wars: The Clone Wars	Greedo, Nute Gunray, Silood, Tan Divo, Nahdar Vebb		
2010	The Cartoonstitute	Various characters		
2011	Pound Puppies	Chuckles, Dogcatcher	Episode: "Dog on a Wire"	
2011	The Cleveland Show	Dr. Fist	Episode: "Skip Day"	
2011–13	Dan Vs.	Crunchy		
2011–13	Generator Rex	Mr. Buchiner, Announcer, Fitzy Feakins		
2012	Mad	Various characters		
2012	Napoleon Dynamite	Curtis		
2012	The Legend of Korra	Referee	3 episodes	
2012	Dragons: Riders of Berk	Mulch, Sven, Amos, Chicken Feed Salesman		
2012–13	Green Lantern: The Animated Series	Zilius Zox, Salaak, Byth Rok, Anti-Monitor, Goblin		
2012–20	Doc McStuffins	Charlie, Purple Monster		
2012–17	Ultimate Spider-Man	Dr. Otto Octavius / Doctor Octopus, Adrian Toomes / Vulture, Wizard, Curt Connors, Whirlwind, Merlyn, others		
2012–17	Teenage Mutant Ninja Turtles	Dr. Tyler Rockwell, various characters		
2012–14	The High Fructose Adventures of Annoying Orange	Coconut, Malacorn, Announcer, Cutesie		
2012–15	Brickleberry	Woody, Dr. Kuzniak, others		
2013	Lego Marvel Super Heroes: Maximum Overload	Doctor Octopus	Web film series	
2013	My Science Fiction Project	Nutmeg, Pterodactyl 2	Pilot	
2013–14	Hulk and the Agents of S.M.A.S.H.	Doctor Octopus, Impossible Man		
2013–15	Henry Hugglemonster	Daddo, Grando		
2013, 2015	Avengers Assemble	Impossible Man, Whirlwind	2 episodes	
2013–16	Wander Over Yonder	Commander Peepers		
2014–18	Clarence	Sumo, others		
2014–23	Teen Titans Go!	Mumbo Jumbo, Magic God, Mockingbird, Powerpuff Girls Narrator		
2014	Ben 10: Omniverse	Groundskeeper Bezel	Episode: "Third Time's a Charm"	
2014	Lego DC Comics: Batman Be-Leaguered	Penguin		
2014–21	Talking Tom & Friends	Hank, others	Web series; voiced Jeremy starting with season 4	
2014–16	Mixels	Various characters		
2014–16	TripTank	Ricky the Rocketship, various characters		
2014–19	The Tom and Jerry Show	Various characters		
2014–present	Rick and Morty	Squanchy, Gene Gilligan, various characters	Recurring role	
2015	Turbo Fast	Judge Snail, Mac Slammer	Episode: "The Mighty Snails"	
2015	Breadwinners	Bear Ruffinbuff, SwaySway's dad	Episode: "Birds of a Feather"	
2015	Transformers: Robots in Disguise	Nightstrike, Cop	Episode: "Even Robots Have Nightmares"	
2015	Fresh Beat Band of Spies	Bo Monkey, Various characters		
2015	Pig Goat Banana Cricket	Various characters		
2015	Be Cool, Scooby-Doo!	Various characters		
2015–19	Niko and the Sword of Light	Mandok		
2015–19	Guardians of the Galaxy	Collector, additional voices		
2015–18	Miles from Tomorrowland	Leo Callisto, various characters		
2015–18	DC Super Hero Girls	Jim Gordon, Crazy Quilt, Sinestro, Lobo		
2015–17	The Mr. Peabody & Sherman Show	Various characters		
2015–16	Fresh Beat Band of Spies	Bo Monkey, Champ von Winnerchamp, various voices		
2016–17	Rolling with the Ronks!	Flash		
2016–17	Mighty Magiswords	Taunting Jester Magisword, Jack O'Lantern Frost	2 episodes	
2016–19	The Powerpuff Girls	Mayor of Townsville, Narrator		
2016	Star vs. the Forces of Evil	Bon Bon the Birthday Clown	Episode: "Bon Bon the Birthday Clown"	
2016	Toasty Tales	Pants	Amazon pilot series	
2016	Home: Adventures with Tip & Oh	Various characters		
2016–20	Trollhunters: Tales of Arcadia	Various characters		
2017–23	Puppy Dog Pals	A.R.F., various voices		
2017	Lego DC Super Hero Girls	Jim Gordon, Kryptomites		
2017	Billy Dilley's Super-Duper Subterranean Summer	Zeke, various voices		
2017	Apollo Gauntlet	Repulsis, others		
2017	Welcome to the Wayne	SpongeRobert RectangleShorts	Episode: "Like No Other Market on Earth"	
2017–19	The Stinky & Dirty Show	Monster Truck	Amazon Prime Series	
2017–19	Wacky Races	Bella, Finky Dalton, Dick Dastardly/Pop, Ricochet Rabbit, Scrappy-Doo		
2017–20	Ben 10	Xingo, Polar Twain	Recurring role	
2018	Spy Kids: Mission Critical	Golden Brain, Spurious Visage, Professor Küpkakke, Tom Thumb Thumb, Dave-Bot		
2018	The Adventures of Rocky and Bullwinkle	Colonel Boudreaux	3 episodes	
2018	Rise of the Teenage Mutant Ninja Turtles	Albearto, Ferry Captain, Director	2 episodes	
2018	We Bare Bears	Various voices		
2018–21	DuckTales	Fethry Duck, Dr. Atmoz Fear		
2018–21	Final Space	HUE, Kevin Van Newton		
2018–19	3Below: Tales of Arcadia	Dadblank, Foo Foo, Officer		
2018–22	Paradise PD	Chief Randall Crawford		
2018–22	Woody Woodpecker	Wally Walrus, various voices	Web series	
2019	Mickey Mouse	Moon	Episode: "Over the Moon"	
2019	SpongeBob's Big Birthday Blowout	SpongeBob SquarePants, Gary, Patchy the Pirate, others	20th anniversary special	
2019	Where's Waldo?	Shopkeeper	Episode: "A Wanderer in Paris"	
2019	Primal	Monkeys	Episode: "Terror Under the Blood Moon"	
2019	BoJack Horseman	Additional voices	Episode: "Feel-Good Story"	
2019	Bob's Burgers	Guy	Episode: "If You Love It So Much, Why Don't You Marionette?"	
2019	Adam Ruins Everything	Officer McQuack	Episode: "Adam Ruins Cops"	
2019–22	Victor and Valentino	Guillermo, various voices		
2019–20	Scooby-Doo and Guess Who?	Various voices		
2020	Harley Quinn	Clayface's Hand	Episode: "You're a Damn Good Cop, Jim Gordon"	
2020	Wizards: Tales of Arcadia	Lock, Dadblank	3 episodes	
2020	Star Trek: Lower Decks	Quimp, Malvus, Captain Anderson, Aurelian Husband, Kynk, Denobulan 1, Ferengi Goon		
2020	Solar Opposites	Wilkins Micawber, Ted Johnson, Mr. Dutch, The Janitor	3 episodes	
2020, 2023	Looney Tunes Cartoons	Mad Scientist	2 episodes	
2020–21	Adventure Time: Distant Lands	Simon Petrikov / The Ice King, additional voices	4 specials ("BMO", "Obsidian", "Together Again" and "Wizard City")	
2021–22	Kid Cosmic	Chuck		
2021–22	He-Man and the Masters of the Universe	Orko		
2021–24	Kamp Koral: SpongeBob's Under Years	SpongeBob SquarePants, Gary, French Narrator, Jellyfish, Campers	Also voice director	
2021–present	The Patrick Star Show	SpongeBob SquarePants, Gary, Ouchie, SpongeMonster, Various	Also voice director	
2022	Batwheels	Crash	3 episodes	
2023–present	Kiff	Gareth, Darryn, Trevor Angstrom, Various characters		
2023–present	Adventure Time: Fionna and Cake	Simon Petrikov / The Ice King		
2023	We Baby Bears	Landlord	Episode: "The Magical Box"	
2023	Frog and Toad	Mink, Firefly		
2023	The Loud House	Announcer, Ice Cream Man	Episode: "Can't Lynn Them All"	
2024	Batman: Caped Crusader	Firebug, Eel O'Brian, Various		
2025	Jellystone!	Mayor of Townsville, Narrator, Eduardo	Episode: "Crisis on Infinite Mirths"	
2026	Helluva Shorts	Mayor/Bigfoot, additional voices	Episode: "Mission: Bigfoot"	
2026	Family Guy	French Narrator, Smokey the Sockpuppet	Episode: "Viewer DMs"	
2026	Adventure Time: Side Quests	Ice King		

=== Theatrical and television films ===
List of voice performances in theatrical and television films
Year	Title	Role	Notes	Source
2001	Dr. Dolittle 2	Male Tortoise		
2002	The Powerpuff Girls Movie	Narrator, Mayor, Mitch, Snake, Lil’ Arturo, Punk, Cruncha Muncha, Ka-Ching Ka-Ching, Pappy Wappy		
2002	Eight Crazy Nights	Sharper Image Chair		
2004	The SpongeBob SquarePants Movie	SpongeBob SquarePants, Gary, Twins, Clay		
2005	Here Comes Peter Cottontail The Movie	Peter Cottontail, Junior, Antoine		
2005	Hoodwinked!	Tommy		
2006	The Ant Bully	Drone Ant, Ants		
2006	Codename: Kids Next Door - Operation Z.E.R.O.	Knightbrace, Mr. Wink		
2007	Happily N'Ever After	Amigo, Dwarf, Wolf, Messenger		
2007	Meet the Robinsons	Mr. Willerstein		
2007	Elf Bowling the Movie: The Great North Pole Elf Strike	Dingle Kringle, Rappelstiltskin, Pirate		
2008	Foster Home for Imagination Friends: Destination: Imagination	Eduardo, Belly Bob Norton		
2009	Transformers: Revenge of the Fallen	Wheelie, Skids		
2011	Winnie the Pooh	Rabbit		
2011	Transformers: Dark of the Moon	Wheelie		
2012	Back to the Sea	Ben		
2012	Zambezia	Marabou		
2012	Frankenweenie	New Holland Townsfolk		
2012	Hotel Transylvania	Skeleton Wife		
2014	Legends of Oz: Dorothy's Return	China Suiter		
2015	The SpongeBob Movie: Sponge Out of Water	SpongeBob SquarePants, Gary, Agreeable Mob Member, Waffle		
2015	Ant-Man	Hideous Bunny		
2016	The Laws of the Universe: Part 0	Ummite	Limited theatrical release	
2017	Transformers: The Last Knight	Wheelie		
2018	Charming	Blessing Fairy		
2018	Teen Titans Go! To the Movies	Machine Voice		
2018	The Laws of the Universe Part 1	Ummite		
2019	Rocko's Modern Life: Static Cling	Heffer, Chuck, additional voices		
2020	The SpongeBob Movie: Sponge on the Run	SpongeBob SquarePants, Gary, French Narrator		
2021	Extinct	Mozart, Sled Dogs		
2022	Guillermo del Toro's Pinocchio	Benito Mussolini, Right-Hand Man, Sea Captain		
2022	Pinocchio: A True Story	Geppetto		
2022	Popeye	Popeye	Tartakovsky left Sony Pictures in 2015 so status is now cancelled	
2023	The Magician's Elephant	Potato Seller, Minister of Defense, Tomas, Sgt. De Smedt, Driver, Stage Manager		
2023	Pinocchio and the Water of Life	Pinocchio, Ed		
2024	Woody Woodpecker Goes to Camp	Wally Walrus		
2024	Saving Bikini Bottom: The Sandy Cheeks Movie	SpongeBob SquarePants, Gary, Lil Frito, Puter, Various		
2025	Plankton: The Movie	SpongeBob SquarePants, Gary, French Narrator, Random Student		
2025	Order Up	SpongeBob SquarePants	Short film	
2025	The SpongeBob Movie: Search for SquarePants	SpongeBob SquarePants, Gary, Morning DJ		

=== Direct-to-video films ===
List of voice performances in direct-to-video films
Year	Title	Role	Notes	Source
2003	Scooby-Doo and the Legend of the Vampire	Lightning Strikes, Stormy Weathers, Barry, Harry, Lifeguard		
2003	The Animatrix	Operator		
2004	Kaena: The Prophecy	Zehos		
2005	Porco Rosso	Ferrari		
2005	Stuart Little 3: Call of the Wild	Forest Animals, Scouts		
2005	Aloha, Scooby-Doo!	Ruben Laluna, California Surfer, Tiny Tiki		
2005	Lil' Pimp	Hans Dribbler Announcer, Billy, Clancey, Adam 12 Cop		
2005	Tom and Jerry: Blast Off to Mars	Grob, Martian Guard, Gardener		
2005	Here Comes Peter Cottontail: The Movie	Peter Cottontail, Junior, Antoine		
2005	Tom and Jerry: The Fast and the Furry	Gorthan, Whale		
2005	The Legend of Frosty the Snowman	Mr. Tinkerton		
2005	The Batman vs. Dracula	Penguin		
2006	Re-Animated	Tux		
2007	Superman: Doomsday	Robot		
2007	Elf Bowling the Movie: The Great North Pole Elf Strike	Dingle Kringle		
2008	Unstable Fables: 3 Pigs and a Baby	Dr. Wolfowitz, Musical Comedy Wolf		
2009	The Haunted World of El Superbeasto	Rover, Otto, Old Man		
2010	Kung Fu Magoo	Dr. Malicio		
2010	Space Chimps 2: Zartog Strikes Back	Ham, Reporter		
2011	Quantum Quest: A Cassini Space Odyssey	General Ignorance		
2011	Twinkle Toes	Dad, others		
2011	Beverly Hills Chihuahua 2	Sebastian		
2012	Beverly Hills Chihuahua 3: Viva la Fiesta!	Sebastian		
2012	Dino Time	Borace, Guard, Tour Guide, Burger Attendant		
2012	Delhi Safari	Alex		
2014	Dragons: Dawn of the Dragon Racers	Silent Sven		
2015	The Flintstones & WWE: Stone Age SmackDown!	Additional voices		
2015	Lego DC Comics Super Heroes: Justice League vs. Bizarro League	Plastic Man, Penguin		
2015	Lego DC Comics Super Heroes: Justice League: Attack of the Legion of Doom	Penguin		
2016	Lego DC Comics Super Heroes: Justice League – Gotham City Breakout	Penguin		
2016	The Adventures of Panda Warrior	Manny Mantis, Bernie Hothead, Spinny		
2016	DC Super Hero Girls: Hero of the Year	Commissioner Gordon, Crazy Quilt		
2017	Lego Scooby-Doo! Blowout Beach Bash	Ron Holdout		
2017	Lego DC Super Hero Girls: Brain Drain	Gordon		
2018	Scooby-Doo! & Batman: The Brave and the Bold	Penguin, Plastic Man		
2018	Lego DC Comics Super Heroes: The Flash	Penguin, Plastic Man		
2018	Batman Ninja	Penguin, Samurai Captain		
2018	DC Super Hero Girls: Legends of Atlantis	Commissioner Gordon, Crazy Quilt		
2019	Justice League vs. the Fatal Five	Bloodsport		
2019	Batman vs. Teenage Mutant Ninja Turtles	Penguin, League of Assassins Ninja		
2019	Lego DC Batman: Family Matters	Gordon, Penguin		
2020	Lego DC Shazam! Magic and Monsters	Penguin, Perry White		
2020	Ben 10 Versus the Universe: The Movie	Polar Twain		
2021	Trollhunters: Rise of the Titans	Ricky Blank		
2021	DC Showcase: Blue Beetle	Dr. Spectro		
2022	Batman and Superman: Battle of the Super Sons	Green Arrow, Penguin		

=== Video games ===
List of voice performances in video games
Year	Title	Role	Notes	Source
1996	Nickelodeon 3D Movie Maker	Heffer Wolfe		
1999	CatDog: Quest for the Golden Hydrant	Dog, Cliff		
1999	Spyro 2: Ripto's Rage!	Spyro		
2000	Spyro: Year of the Dragon	Spyro, Sgt. Byrd		
2000	Nicktoons Racing	SpongeBob SquarePants, Dog	Archival audio	
2001	Nicktoons Nick Tunes	SpongeBob SquarePants		
2001	Final Fantasy X	Rin		
2001	SpongeBob SquarePants: SuperSponge	SpongeBob SquarePants, Gary, French Narrator		
2001	SpongeBob SquarePants: Operation Krabby Patty	SpongeBob SquarePants, Gary, French Narrator		
2001	Star Wars Rogue Squadron II: Rogue Leader	Biggs, Rebel Wingman, Transport Captain		
2002	SpongeBob SquarePants: Employee of the Month	SpongeBob SquarePants		
2002	Nickelodeon Party Blast	SpongeBob SquarePants, Dog		
2002	Spyro: Enter the Dragonfly	Spyro, additional voices		
2002	SpongeBob SquarePants: Revenge of the Flying Dutchman	SpongeBob SquarePants, Gary, French Narrator		
2002	The Powerpuff Girls: Relish Rampage	Mayor, Snake		
2003	Nickelodeon Toon Twister 3-D	SpongeBob SquarePants, Gary		
2003	Star Wars: Rogue Squadron III: Rebel Strike	Biggs Darklighter		
2003	SpongeBob SquarePants: Battle for Bikini Bottom	SpongeBob SquarePants, Gary, King Jellyfish, French Narrator		
2003	Scooby-Doo! Mystery Mayhem	Earl Milton, Johnny Channayapatra, Billy Bob, Mercenaries, Shermantech Scientists		
2003	Final Fantasy X-2	Rin		
2004	Samurai Jack: The Shadow of Aku	Slaves, Villagers, Kid		
2004	SpongeBob SquarePants: Typing	SpongeBob SquarePants, Gary, French Narrator		
2004	Nicktoons Movin'	SpongeBob SquarePants, Gary, French Narrator		
2004	The SpongeBob SquarePants Movie	SpongeBob SquarePants, Gary, French Narrator	Also Mac version in 2005	
2005	Teen Titans	Mumbo Jumbo		
2005	SpongeBob SquarePants: Lights, Camera, Pants!	SpongeBob SquarePants, Gary, French Narrator		
2005	Nicktoons Unite!	SpongeBob SquarePants, Gary, French Narrator		
2005	Codename: Kids Next Door – Operation: V.I.D.E.O.G.A.M.E.	Knightbrace, Common Cold, Skinny Candy Pirate		
2006	SpongeBob SquarePants: Creature from the Krusty Krab	SpongeBob SquarePants, Gary, French Narrator		
2006	Nicktoons: Battle for Volcano Island	SpongeBob SquarePants		
2006	Xiaolin Showdown	Raimundo Pedrosa		
2006	Cartoon Network Racing	Carl		
2006	Spongebob SquarePants: Nighty Nightmare	SpongeBob SquarePants		
2007	Brave: The Search for Spirit Dancer	Arnaluk		
2007	SpongeBob's Atlantis SquarePantis	SpongeBob SquarePants		
2007	Nicktoons: Attack of the Toybots	SpongeBob SquarePants		
2008	Lego Batman: The Videogame	Penguin, Riddler, Police Officers	Vocal Effects only, No Dialogue	
2008	SpongeBob SquarePants Featuring Nicktoons: Globs of Doom	SpongeBob SquarePants, Gary		
2009	SpongeBob's Truth or Square	SpongeBob SquarePants, Gary		
2009	FusionFall	Mayor of Townsville, Eduardo, Ice King		
2010	SpongeBob's Boating Bash	SpongeBob SquarePants, French Narrator		
2010	Marvel Super Hero Squad: The Infinity Gauntlet	Iron Man, MODOK		
2011	Marvel Super Hero Squad: Comic Combat	Iron Man, Captain America, MODOK		
2011	SpongeBob SquigglePants	Patchy the Pirate, SpongeBob SquarePants		
2011	Nicktoons MLB	SpongeBob SquarePants		
2011	SpongeBob's Surf & Skate Roadtrip	SpongeBob SquarePants		
2013	SpongeBob SquarePants: Plankton's Robotic Revenge	SpongeBob SquarePants, French Narrator		
2013	Marvel Heroes	Doctor Octopus, Morph		
2013	Lightning Returns: Final Fantasy XIII	Additional voices		
2014	Disney Infinity 2.0: Marvel Super Heroes	Doctor Octopus	Grouped under "Featuring the Voice Talents"	
2015	SpongeBob HeroPants	SpongeBob SquarePants		
2015	King's Quest	Merchant of Miracles		
2016	Lego Dimensions	Narrator, Ice King, Magic Man, Mayor of Townsville, Lumpy Space Citizen, Ghost Penguin Minions, Ice King Balloon	Grouped under "Voice Talents"	
2017	Prey	Medical Operator AI		
2018	Adventure Time: Pirates of the Enchiridion	Ice King, Candy Person, Flame Person, Mushroom Person		
2018	Spyro Reignited Trilogy	Spyro		
2019	Crash Team Racing Nitro-Fueled	Spyro, Dr. N. Brio / Additional Voices		
2019	Kingdom Hearts III	Rabbit		
2020	Samurai Jack: Battle Through Time	Scaramouche		
2020	Trollhunters: Defenders of Arcadia	Gut, Enrique, Gnomes		
2020	SpongeBob SquarePants: Battle for Bikini Bottom – Rehydrated	SpongeBob SquarePants, French Narrator, Gary, Jellyfish, King Jellyfish	Archival audio	
2021	Nickelodeon All-Star Brawl	SpongeBob SquarePants, Dog	Voiceover added in the June 2022 update	
2022	Final Space: The Rescue	HUE, S.A.M.E.S.		
2022	Nickelodeon Extreme Tennis	SpongeBob SquarePants, Dog		
2022	Nickelodeon Kart Racers 3: Slime Speedway	SpongeBob SquarePants, Dog		
2022	High on Life	Douglas/Dr. Joopy		
2023	SpongeBob SquarePants: The Cosmic Shake	SpongeBob SquarePants, Gary, French Narrator		
2023	Nickelodeon All-Star Brawl 2	SpongeBob SquarePants, Gary, King Jellyfish		
2024	SpongeBob SquarePants: The Patrick Star Game	SpongeBob SquarePants, Gary, King Jellyfish		
2025	Nicktoons & The Dice of Destiny	SpongeBob SquarePants, Gary, Dirty Bubble		
2025	SpongeBob SquarePants: Titans of the Tide	SpongeBob SquarePants, Gary, French Narrator, King Jellyfish		
2027	Spyro: A Realm Beyond	Spyro		

=== Other media ===
List of voice performances in other media
Year	Title	Role	Notes	Source
2003	Jimmy Neutron's Nicktoon Blast	SpongeBob SquarePants, Gary	Amusement park attraction	
2005	SpongeBob 4D	SpongeBob SquarePants, Sandels, Jellyfish	Amusement park attraction	
2012	Marvel Super Heroes 4D	Spider-Man	Amusement park attraction	

== Live-action roles ==
=== Feature films ===
List of live-action acting performances in feature films
Year	Title	Role	Notes	Source
1989	How I Got into College	B		
1991	Shakes the Clown	Binky the Clown		
1994	Plughead Rewired: Circuitry Man II	Guru		
2002	Run Ronnie Run!			
2003	Scary Movie 3	Alien		
2004	Comic Book: The Movie	Derek Sprang		
2004	Surviving Christmas	Man Wrapping Gift		
2005	Sky High	Mr. Timmerman		
2009	World's Greatest Dad	Jerry Klein		
2011	God Bless America		Uncredited cameo	
2017	Battle of the Sexes	Bob Sanders		

=== Television ===
List of live-action acting performances on television
Year	Title	Role	Notes	Source
1990–95	Friday Night Videos	"Music News" segments		
1992–93	The Edge	Various characters	Sketch comedy series	
1992	Medusa: Dare to Be Truthful	Bobo Kaufman	Television film	
1994	Attack of the 5 Ft. 2 In. Women	Director	Television film	
1995–98	Mr. Show	Cast member	Seasons 1–3; guest appearance season 4	
1995	Dead Weekend	Joe Blow	Television film	
1995	Out There	Man in Lobby	Television film	
1996	Malibu Shores	Debate Moderator	Episode: "Cheating Hearts"	
1996	Arli$$	Greg Reem	Episode: "Colors of the Rainbow"	
1996–97	Brotherly Love	Guest characters		
1997–98	Just Shoot Me	Persky	Recurring role, season 2	
2001	That '70s Show	Woofy the Dog	Episode: "Eric's Depression"	
2003	Windy City Heat	Santiago, the Gay Costume Designer	Television film	
2010	True Jackson, VP	Bingo	2 episodes	
2011	Big Time Rush	Patchy the Pirate	Episode: "Big Time Beach Party"	
2013	The Haunting Hour: The Series	Uncle Howee	Episode: "Uncle Howee"	
2015	W/ Bob and David	Cast member from Mr. Show	Netflix release	
2019	The SpongeBob Musical: Live on Stage!	Patchy the Pirate, French Narrator	TV musical adaptation	

List of other live-action appearances
Year	Title	Role	Notes	Source
2004–2013, 2021–present	Nickelodeon Kids' Choice Awards	Announcer, Presenter in some shows		
2004–2005	Jimmy Kimmel Live!	Himself		
2009	Square Roots: The Story of SpongeBob SquarePants	Himself	TV documentary	
2011	BrainSurge	Guest host	Ep. 223	
2013	I Know That Voice	Himself	Documentary on voice acting	
2020	Nickelodeon's Unfiltered	Toaster Face	Episode: "Cactus Pop Tarts!"	

== Awards and nominations ==
Year	Award	Category	Work	Result	Refs
2001	Annie Awards	Best Voice Acting by a Male Performer in an Animated Television Production	SpongeBob SquarePants	Nominated	
2008	Annie Awards	Best Voice Acting in an Animated Television Production	SpongeBob SquarePants	Nominated	
2010	Annie Awards	Best Voice Acting in an Animated Television Production	SpongeBob SquarePants	Won	
2012	Behind the Voice Actor Awards	Best Vocal Ensemble in a Feature Film	Winnie the Pooh	Nominated	
2012	Behind the Voice Actor Awards	Best Vocal Ensemble in a Feature Film	Transformers: Dark of the Moon	Nominated	
2012	Behind the Voice Actor Awards	Voice Actor of the Year	Himself	Nominated	
2013	Behind the Voice Actor Awards	Voice Actor of the Year	Himself	Nominated	
2013	Behind the Voice Actor Awards	Best Vocal Ensemble in a Television Series Children's/Educational	SpongeBob SquarePants	Nominated	
2013	Behind the Voice Actor Awards	Best Performance in a Narrating Role	SpongeBob SquarePants	Nominated	
2013	Behind the Voice Actor Awards	Best Vocal Ensemble in a New Television Series	Green Lantern: The Animated Series	Nominated	
2013	Behind the Voice Actor Awards	Best Male Vocal Performance in a Television in a Supporting Role Comedy/Musical	Adventure Time	Won	
2013	Behind the Voice Actor Awards	Best Male Vocal Performance in a Television in a Supporting Role Action/Drama	Ultimate Spider-Man	Nominated	
2014	Behind the Voice Actor Awards	Best Vocal Ensemble in a Television Series - Comedy/Musical	Adventure Time	Won	
2014	Behind the Voice Actor Awards	Best Male Vocal Performance in a Television Series in a Supporting Role - Comedy/Musical	Adventure Time	Won	
2014	Behind the Voice Actor Awards	Best Vocal Ensemble in a New Television Series	Henry HuggleMonster	Won	
2014	Annie Awards	Best Voice Acting in an Animated Television / Broadcast Production	Adventure Time	Won	
2015	Behind the Voice Actor Awards	Best Vocal Ensemble in a Television Series - Children's/Educational	Henry HuggleMonster	Nominated	
2015	Behind the Voice Actor Awards	Best Male Vocal Performance in a Television Series in a Supporting Role - Action/Drama	Ultimate Spider-Man	Nominated	
2015	Behind the Voice Actor Awards	Voice Actor of the Year	Himself	Nominated	
2016	Annie Awards	Best Voice Acting in an Animated Feature	The SpongeBob Movie: Sponge Out of Water	Nominated	
2016	Behind the Voice Actor Awards	Best Vocal Ensemble in a New Television Series	Fresh Beat Band of Spies	Nominated	
2016	Behind the Voice Actor Awards	Best Male Vocal Performance in a Video Game in a Supporting Role	King's Quest	Nominated	
2016	Behind the Voice Actor Awards	Best Male Lead Vocal Performance in a Feature Film	The SpongeBob Movie: Sponge Out of Water	Won	
2016	Behind the Voice Actor Awards	Best Vocal Ensemble in a Feature Film	The SpongeBob Movie: Sponge Out of Water	Nominated	
2016	Behind the Voice Actor Awards	Voice Actor of the Year	Himself	Won	
2016	Behind the Voice Actor Awards	Best Vocal Ensemble in an Anime Feature Film/Special	The Laws of the Universe Part 0	Nominated	
2016	Behind the Voice Actor Awards	Best Male Vocal Performance in an Anime Feature Film/Special in a Supporting Role	The Laws of the Universe Part 0	Nominated	
2017	Behind the Voice Actor Awards	Best Vocal Ensemble in a TV Special/Direct-to-DVD Title or Short	DC Super Hero Girls: Hero of the Year	Nominated	
2018	Behind the Voice Actor Awards	Best Male Vocal Performance in a Television Series in a Supporting Role	Samurai Jack	Nominated	
2018	Behind the Voice Actor Awards	Best Vocal Ensemble in a Television Series	Samurai Jack	Won	
2018	Behind the Voice Actor Awards	Best Vocal Ensemble in a New Television Series	Niko and the Sword of Light	Won	
2018	Behind the Voice Actor Awards	Best Vocal Ensemble in a Video Game	Prey	Nominated	
2018	Behind the Voice Actor Awards	Voice Actor of the Year	Himself	Nominated	
2018	Daytime Emmy Awards	Outstanding Performer in an Animated Program	SpongeBob SquarePants	Won	
2020	Daytime Emmy Awards	Outstanding Performer in an Animated Program	SpongeBob SquarePants	Won	
2021	Daytime Emmy Awards	Outstanding Performer in an Animated Program	SpongeBob SquarePants	Nominated	
2021	Daytime Emmy Awards	Outstanding Voice Directing for a Daytime Animated Series	SpongeBob SquarePants	Nominated	
2022	Syracuse Area Music Awards	Lifetime Achievement	Himself	Won	
2022	Syracuse Area Music Awards	Hall of Fame	Himself	Inducted	
2022	Kids' Choice Awards	Favorite Voice from an Animated Movie	The SpongeBob Movie: Sponge on the Run	Nominated	
2022	Children's and Family Emmy Awards	Outstanding Voice Performance in an Animated Program	SpongeBob SquarePants	Nominated	
2023	Children's and Family Emmy Awards	Outstanding Voice Performance in an Animated Program	SpongeBob SquarePants	Nominated	
