= Tom Kenny =

American actor and comedian (born 1962)

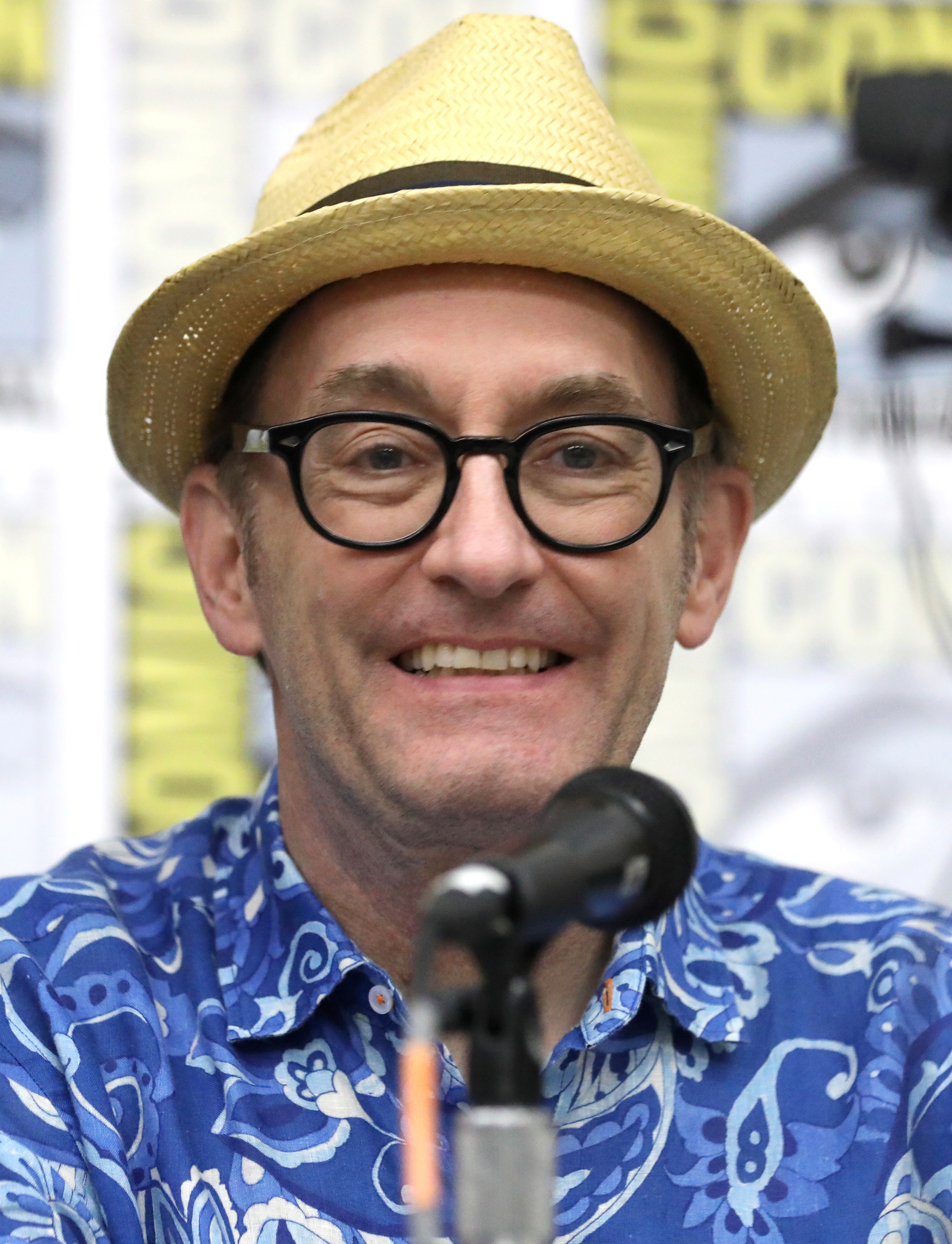
- Kenny at the 2023 San Diego Comic-Con
- Born: Thomas James Kenny; July 13, 1962 (age 64); Syracuse, New York, U.S.
- Occupations: Actor; comedian
- Years active: 1981–present
- Works: Roles and awards
- Spouse: Jill Talley (m. 1996)
- Children: 2
- Kenny's speaking voice On the conception of the musical adaptation of SpongeBob SquarePants

Signature
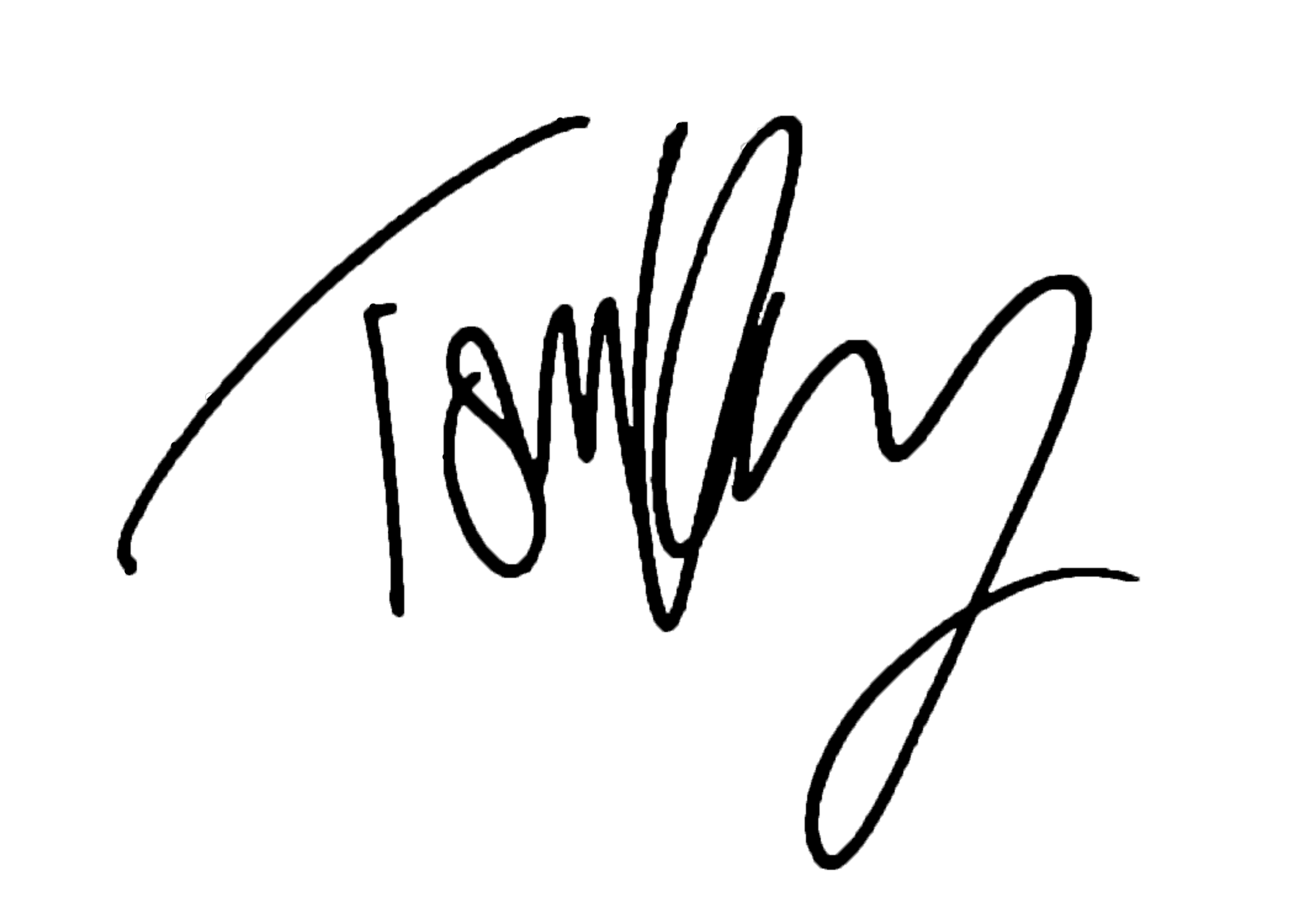

Thomas James Kenny (born July 13, 1962) is an American actor and comedian. Since 1999, he has voiced the titular character in SpongeBob SquarePants and its associated media.

Kenny performed stand-up comedy for eight years before receiving his debut role Savage Steve Holland's How I Got into College in 1989. He began working with Nickelodeon in 1993 after being cast in Rocko's Modern Life; during his time on the show, he befriended the show's creative director, Stephen Hillenburg. Hillenburg approached Kenny in 1997, offering him the role of SpongeBob SquarePants in the show of the corresponding name.

His other voice roles include the Ice King in Adventure Time and its spinoff Adventure Time: Fionna and Cake, Spyro in the Spyro video game series, Heffer Wolfe in Rocko's Modern Life, the Narrator and Mayor in The Powerpuff Girls, Dog in CatDog, Carl Chryniszzswics in Johnny Bravo, Starscream in Transformers: Animated, The Penguin in various animated media based on DC Comics, and Raimundo Pedrosa in Xiaolin Showdown. Kenny's live-action work includes the sketch comedy series The Edge and Mr. Show with Bob and David. Among other accolades, he has received two Daytime Emmy Awards and two Annie Awards for his voice work.

== Biography ==
=== Early life and stand-up comedy ===
Thomas James Kenny was born in Syracuse, New York, on July 13, 1962, and was raised there. His parents were Theresa (née Donigan) and Paul Kenny. As a young child, in the late 1960s and the 1970s, he loved drawing and collecting record albums. Kenny met Bobcat Goldthwait in first grade and they became lifelong friends. In their mid-teens, they saw an ad for an open-mic night at Skaneateles that featured comedian Barry Crimmins with the moniker "Bear Cat". He and Goldthwait went to the event, and performed under the monikers Tomcat and Bobcat, respectively, as a tribute to Crimmins, after which Goldthwait used Bobcat as his stage name. Describing Kenny's stand-up routines, Goldthwait said, "Tom would get up there and talk about his therapist and he didn't even have a therapist, he just loved Woody Allen."

Kenny's Senior yearbook photo at Bishop Grimes High School in 1980

Kenny went to Bishop Grimes Junior/Senior High School, a Catholic high school. He received his first paid comedy role at Syracuse University's Jabberwocky music club in 1979. After graduating high school, he performed stand-up comedy around the country for about eight years before he moved on to other venues.

=== Television and film career ===
Kenny has acted in many films and TV shows, debuting in How I Got into College (1989) and later appeared in films such as Shakes the Clown (1991) and Comic Book: The Movie (2004). On television, he would host the "Music News" segments of Friday Night Videos in the early 1990s. He appeared in sketch comedy shows The Edge which aired on Fox from 1992 to 1993, and Mr. Show which aired on HBO from 1995 to 1998, both roles in the show were as a regular cast member. He appears in the live-action segments of SpongeBob SquarePants as Patchy the Pirate, appeared on R. L. Stine's The Haunting Hour: The Series on the season four episode, "Uncle Howee" as Uncle Howee, a high-energy kids' show host with strange powers. In 1997, he had a recurring role as Persky in season two of the NBC sitcom Just Shoot Me!.

=== Voice acting ===
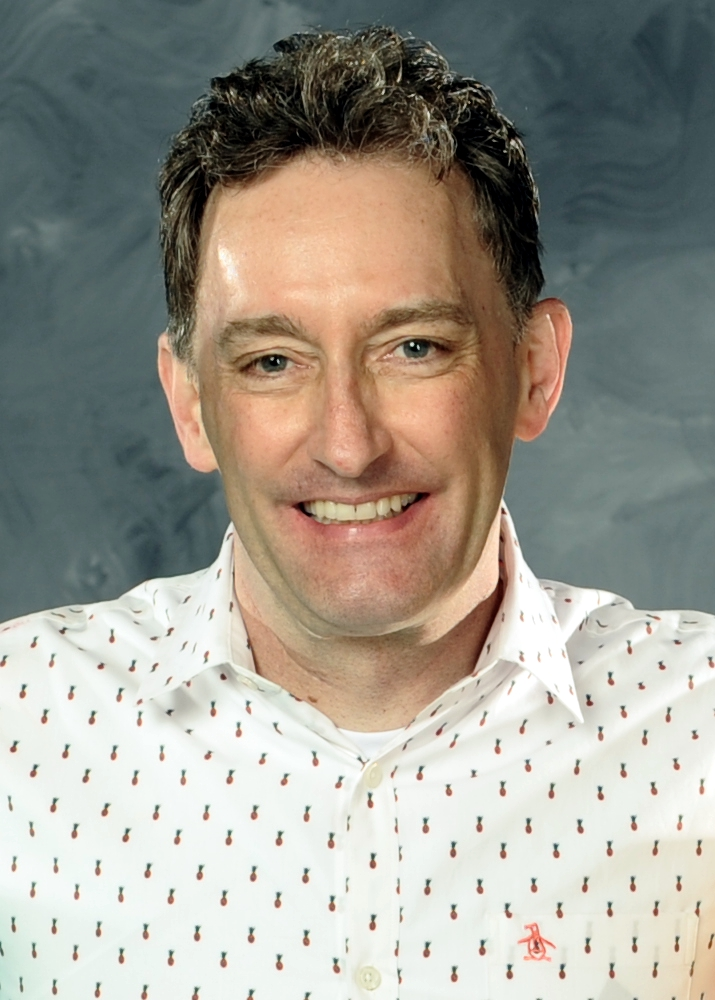
Kenny at the 2015 Florida Supercon

Kenny said that he voices "a lot of sweet yellow characters for some reason." He described SpongeBob's voice as in between that of a child and an adult, stating "Think a Stan Laurel, Jerry Lewis kind of child-man. Kind of like a Munchkin but not quite, kind of like a kid, but not in a Charlie Brown child's voice on the TV shows."

Joe Murray auditioned Kenny for voice acting roles for Rocko's Modern Life in a casting call in Los Angeles, California. On one occasion, the producers required Kenny to fill the role of Charlie Adler, who was absent. He also voiced Cupid on the Nickelodeon show The Fairly OddParents.

Joe Murray chose Kenny for several roles on another of his projects, Camp Lazlo as Scoutmaster Lumpus and Slinkman, because Murray, after seeing Kenny's previous work for Rocko's Modern Life, felt that Kenny "adds writing to his roles" and "brings so much".

He voiced Dog in CatDog, as well as the voice of Cliff. He voices many characters in The Powerpuff Girls, including the Mayor, the Narrator, Mitch Mitchelson, Snake and Little Arturo from the Gangreen Gang, Rainbow the Clown, etc. He voiced Eduardo and various other characters in Foster's Home For Imaginary Friends, Dr. Two-Brains in the PBS Kids show, WordGirl, and the villains Knightbrace, the Common Cold and Mr. Wink in Codename: Kids Next Door.

Kenny is the Penguin in the 2004 TV series The Batman.

He voiced the character Squanchy on Rick and Morty.

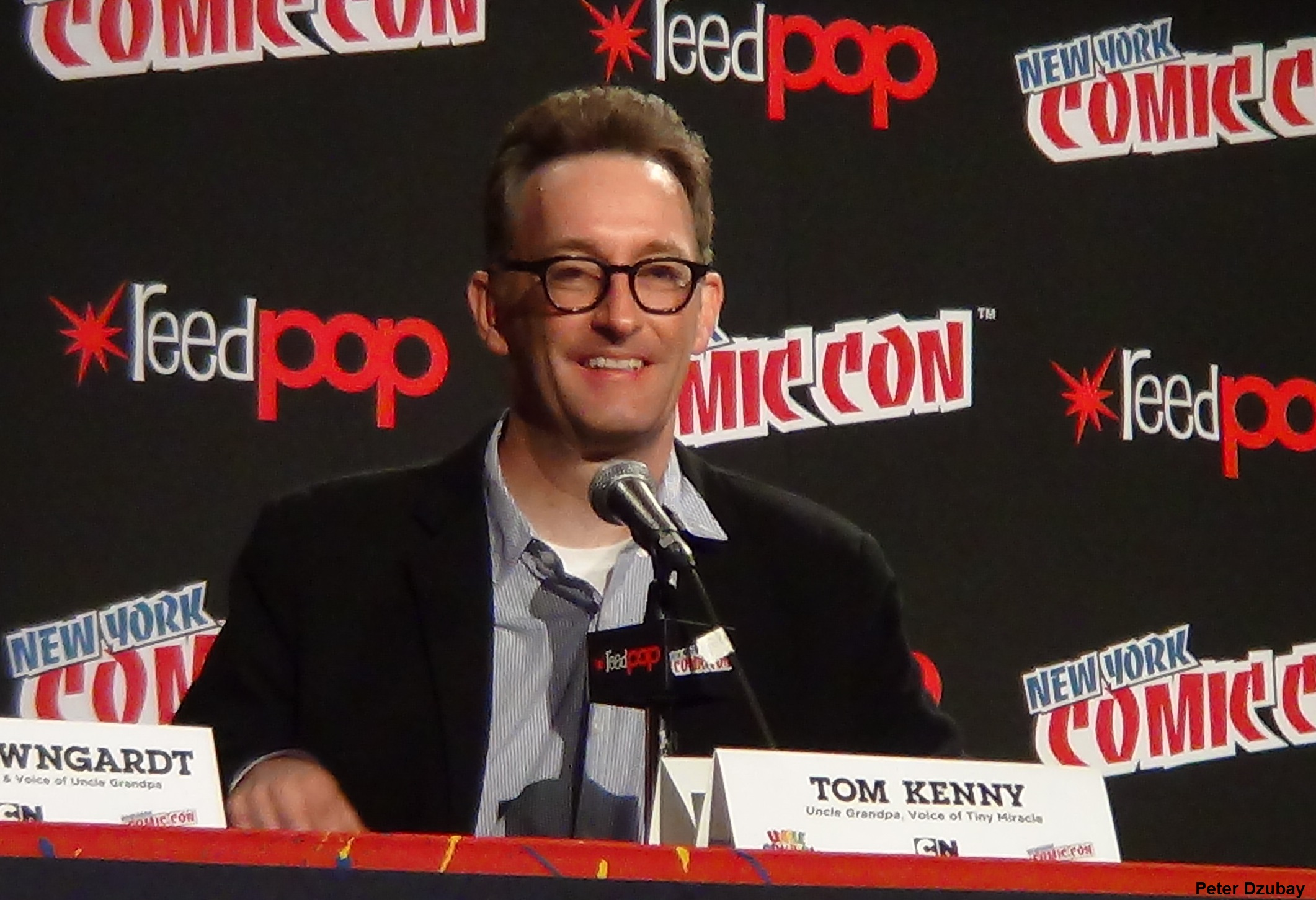
Kenny at New York Comic Con in 2014

He plays a number of roles in the Transformers Animated TV show. A few of the characters he voices in this series are Starscream and his clones, Isaac Sumdac and Waspinator. Kenny also voiced several characters on the animated show Xiaolin Showdown, as well as the Autobots Skids and Wheelie in the live-action Transformers film series. On Dilbert, Kenny voiced Ratbert, Asok, Dilbert's shower, and some minor characters. He played Mr. Hal Gibson in the animated kids show Super Robot Monkey Team Hyper Force GO!.

In 2009, Kenny became a regular cast voice in the Fox comedy series Sit Down, Shut Up. He voices Muhammad Sabeeh "Happy" Fa-ach Nuabar, the secretive custodian who is plotting a terrorist attack, as well as Happy's interpreter. The series premiered on April 19, 2009. Kenan Thompson, Kristin Chenoweth, Jason Bateman, Nick Kroll, Cheri Oteri, Henry Winkler, Will Arnett, and Will Forte are the other main cast members.

He plays the Ice King and Magic Man on Adventure Time. In 2011, Kenny took over the role of Rabbit from Ken Sansom in Winnie the Pooh. From 2012 to 2014, Kenny voiced Woody Johnson on Comedy Central's Brickleberry. He voiced various characters in the Cartoon Network programme Mixels, Sumo in the Cartoon Network programme Clarence, Daddo in Henry Hugglemonster, Dr. Otto Octavius on The Ultimate Spider-Man, and Leo Callisto in Miles from Tomorrowland.

He has also provided voices in television advertisements for Best Buy (as an elf for a Christmas spot), Experian (as a talking modem alongside DC Douglas), and Talking Hank in the YouTube web series Talking Tom and Friends.

In video games, Kenny has served as the voice of Spyro the Dragon, having replaced previous voice actor Carlos Alazraqui. He first voiced Spyro in Spyro 2: Ripto's Rage!, and continued to voice the character up until Spyro: A Hero's Tail, where he was replaced by Jess Harnell. In addition to voicing Spyro, Kenny also provided voices for the Professor in Ripto's Rage! and Sgt. James Byrd in Spyro: Year of the Dragon. Kenny returned to voicing Spyro in 2018 with the release of Spyro Reignited Trilogy, a collection of modern remakes of the original Spyro trilogy. Kenny will continue to voice Spyro in Spyro: A Realm Beyond, scheduled to be released in 2027. He also voiced Crash Bandicoot live at E3 1997, switching out performances with Carlos Alazraqui.

Kenny was a guest star on HarmonQuest as both himself and his "in-game character" Legnahcra the maître d' of Virtuous Harmony.

He also voiced Fethry Duck in the 2017 version of DuckTales. In 2022, he voiced Benito Mussolini and other characters in Guillermo del Toro's Pinocchio.

Kenny reprised his role as Ice King in the 2023 spinoff series Adventure Time: Fionna and Cake.

Kenny voiced the character Mumbo in Teen Titans.

==== SpongeBob SquarePants ====
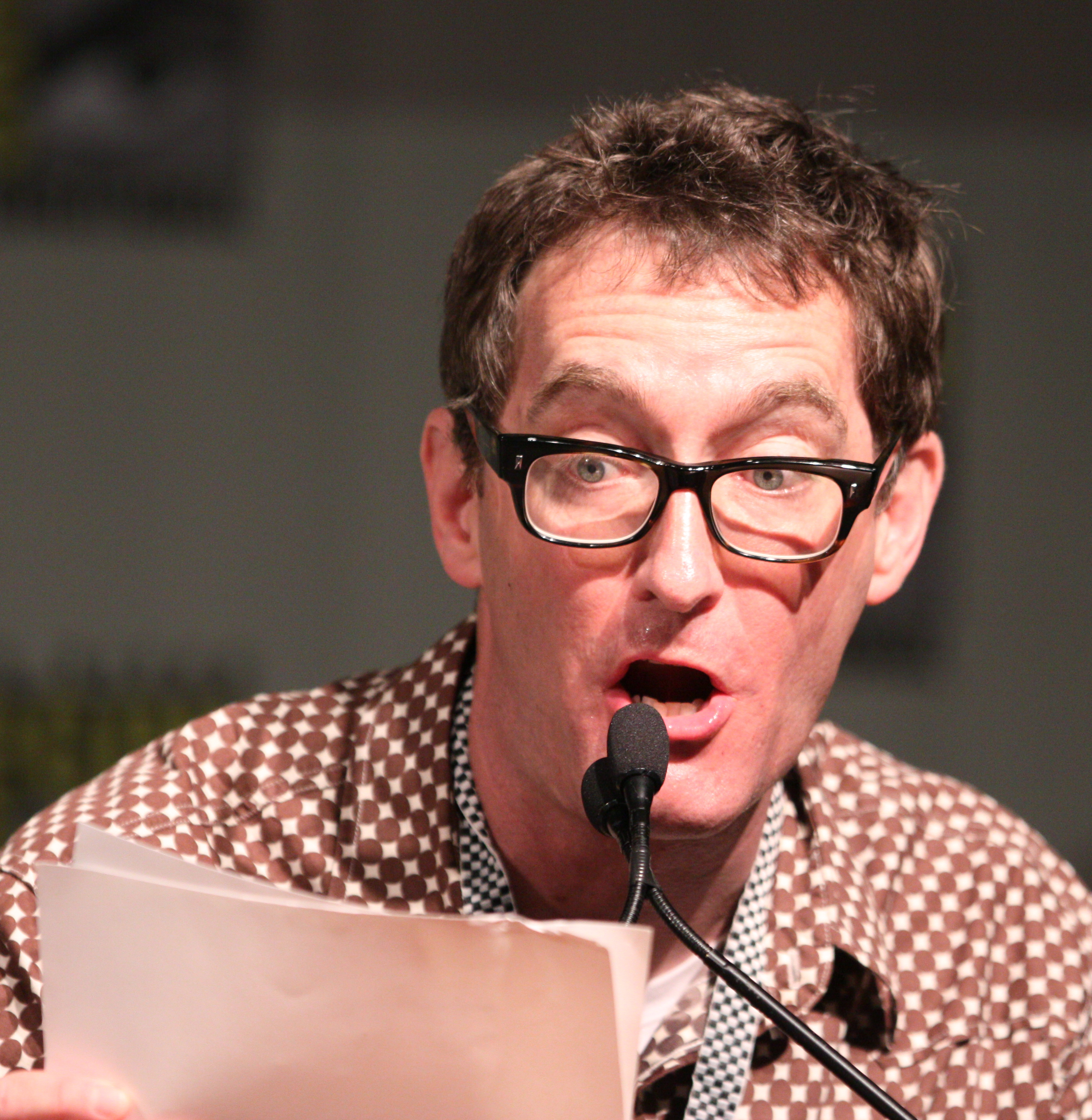
Kenny in 2010 at San Diego Comic Con

While working on the animated series Rocko's Modern Life, Kenny met marine biologist and animator Stephen Hillenburg. After the cancellation of Rocko's Modern Life in 1996, Hillenburg began developing his own concept for an ocean-themed series, building off of his background in marine science. Hillenburg said that he wanted to base the show on his favorite animal, the sea sponge, "because it's a funny animal, a strange one." To voice this character, Hillenburg approached Kenny in 1997.

The series, titled SpongeBob SquarePants, premiered on Nickelodeon on May 1, 1999. It soon became a commercial success. Kenny plays various other characters on the show, including the live-action character Patchy the Pirate and the voices of Gary the Snail, the French Narrator (a parody of Jacques Cousteau), and SpongeBob's father (Harold SquarePants). In 2010, Kenny received the Annie Award for "Voice Acting in a Television Production" for his role as SpongeBob in SpongeBob's Truth or Square (season 6, episode 23–24). He also voiced SpongeBob in the sequel film released on February 6, 2015 along with the subsequent films in the series. In 2018 and 2020, he received the Daytime Emmy Award for Outstanding Performer in an Animated Program.

The television show celebrated its 20th anniversary in 2019. In celebration, a television special was aired, titled "SpongeBob's Big Birthday Blowout". One scene includes each of the show's main characters' voice actors portraying live-action versions of their characters. While not the first SpongeBob SquarePants episode that blended animated sequences with live-action characters, this was the first time that the characters' voice actors have all played a live-action scene all together. The airing was recognized as honoring the show's creator Stephen Hillenburg, who had died one year earlier.

Later in 2019, he was featured in the live recording of the Broadway musical SpongeBob SquarePants playing the role of Patchy the Pirate. Since 2021, he has voiced Sponegbob in the spin off series The Patrick Star Show.

Super Bowl LVIII, which took place in 2024, was broadcast on CBS; the network's parent company Paramount also owns Nickelodeon, the network that airs SpongeBob SquarePants. As part of a plan to maximize the use of its broadcasting rights partnership with the National Football League (NFL), Paramount decided to air an "alternative" Super Bowl telecast on Nickelodeon that was aimed to be more family-friendly. The channel's website claimed that the broadcast was intended for "kids of all ages, from 2 to 102". The broadcast on Nickelodeon was hosted by Nate Burleson and Noah Eagle in live-action and accompanying them were SpongeBob and Patrick. Tom Kenny and Patrick's voice actor Bill Fagerbakke voiced the characters in real-time, improvising their own jokes in-character, and also utilized motion capture. Kenny commented that the Nickelodeon airing allowed viewers who weren't football fans to still engage with the game.

Kenny and Fagerbakke also hosted the 2024 Kids Choice Awards as SpongeBob and Patrick. They voiced their characters while being filmed backstage via motion capture, marking the first time the ceremony has been hosted by animated characters.

== Personal life ==
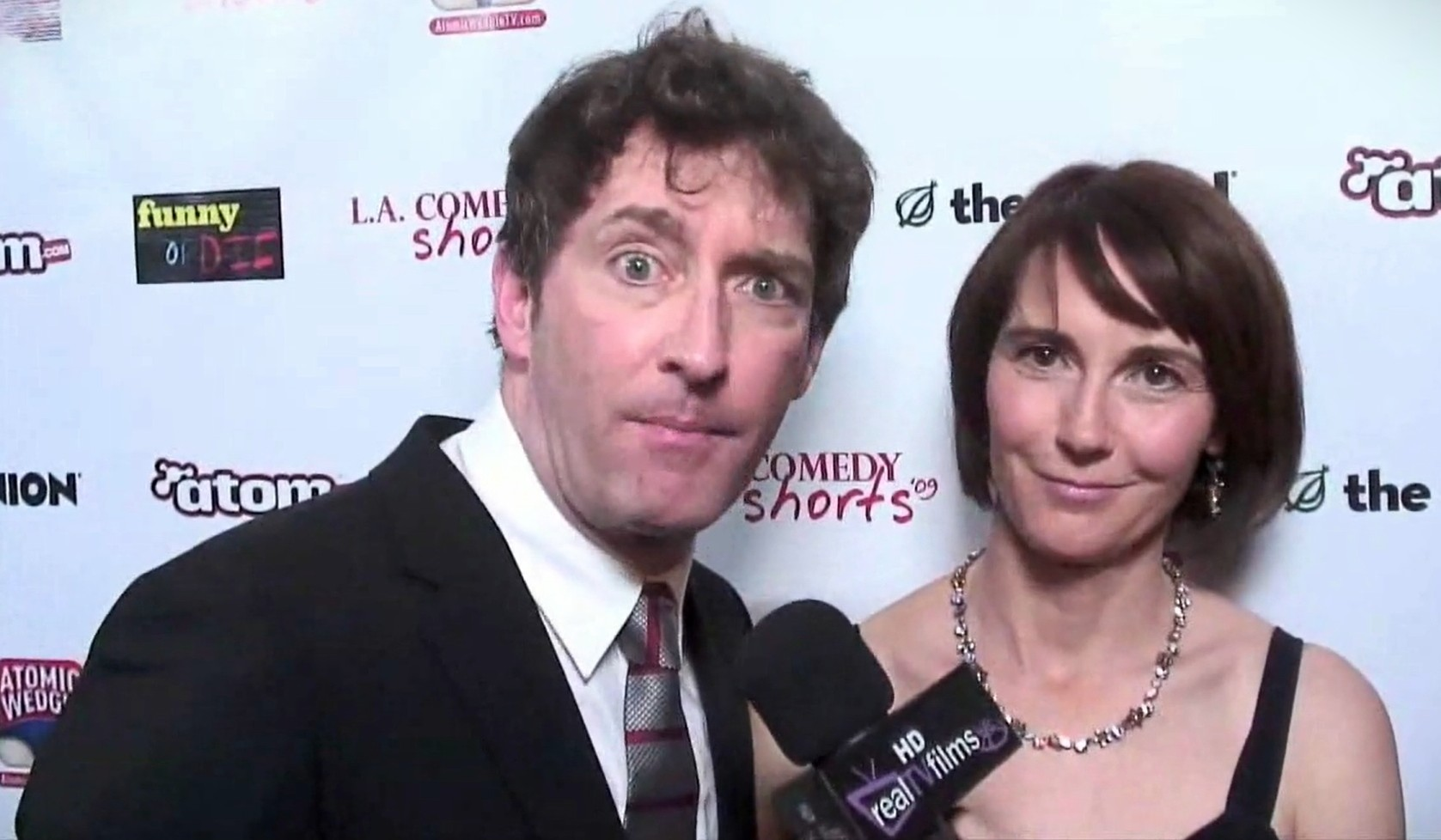
Tom Kenny and Jill Talley in 2009

Kenny first met his wife Jill Talley in 1992 while working on The Edge. The two have collaborated on many productions together, including SpongeBob SquarePants (in which Talley voices Karen Plankton). They also both appeared in the music video for "Tonight, Tonight" by the Smashing Pumpkins. They have two children, Mack (b. 1997) and Nora (b. 2003). The Kennys live in Studio City, California.

== Accolades ==
Kenny has been nominated for a Daytime Emmy 4 times winning in 2018 and 2020 for Outstanding Performer in an Animated Program as SpongeBob SquarePants.

He has been nominated for multiple Annie Awards winning in 2010 for his work on SpongeBob and 2014 for his work on Adventure Time. Kenny hosted the show in 2005 and 2011.

In 2022, Kenny was honored at the Syracuse Area Music Awards (Sammy Awards), headlining the event and being given the lifetime achievement award along with getting inducted into the Sammy's Hall of Fame.

Preceded by Carlos Alazraqui	Voice of Spyro the Dragon; 1999–2002, 2018-present	Succeeded by Jess Harnell
Preceded by Charlie Adler	Voice of Starscream; 2007–2009	Succeeded by Sam Riegel
Preceded by Frank Welker	Voice of Wheelie; 2009–present	Succeeded by current
