= SpongeBob SquarePants: The Cosmic Shake =

2023 video game

- Developer: Purple Lamp
- Publisher: THQ Nordic (Note: Android and iOS versions published by HandyGames)
- Directors: Daniel Bernard; Adam Khoury
- Producer: Martin Kreuch
- Designers: Julian Breddy; Adam Khoury; Daniela Etzinger; Andreas Lenz; Armin Hotter
- Programmers: Philipp Kogelnig; Marcus Waldhütter; Federico Nisoli
- Artists: Stefan Krastev; Targo Sirol; Julian Berger
- Writers: Sebastian Klemm-Lorenz; Tina Hörgl
- Composers: Anderson Alden; Jake Boring; Aaron Kaplan
- Series: SpongeBob SquarePants
- Engine: Unreal Engine 4
- Platforms: Microsoft Windows; Nintendo Switch; PlayStation 4; Xbox One; PlayStation 5; Xbox Series X/S; iOS; Android
- Release: Windows, Switch, PS4, Xbox One; January 31, 2023; PS5, Xbox Series X/S; October 24, 2023; iOS; December 12, 2023; Android; December 21, 2023
- Genres: Platform, action-adventure
- Mode: Single-player

SpongeBob SquarePants: The Cosmic Shake is a 2023 platform game developed by Purple Lamp and published by THQ Nordic. The game is based on the Nickelodeon animated series SpongeBob SquarePants. The player controls SpongeBob, who, along with Patrick, journeys across several alternate realities called "Wish Worlds" to save their friends and the town of Bikini Bottom while collecting Cosmic Jelly for the mermaid fortune teller Madame Kassandra.

The Cosmic Shake was green-lit by Nickelodeon and THQ Nordic following the success of Purple Lamp's previous title, SpongeBob SquarePants: Battle for Bikini Bottom – Rehydrated (2020), and was conceived as a spiritual successor to the 2003 original game. The developers focused on making the game more story-driven and fast-paced than its predecessor, in addition to a larger focus on quests and cosmetics. Unlike its predecessor, only SpongeBob is playable.

The Cosmic Shake was released for Nintendo Switch, PlayStation 4, Windows, and Xbox One on January 31, 2023. The game received mixed reviews from critics, who praised the faithfulness to the source material, but criticized its lack of innovation. A sequel, SpongeBob SquarePants: Titans of the Tide, was released in 2025.

== Gameplay ==
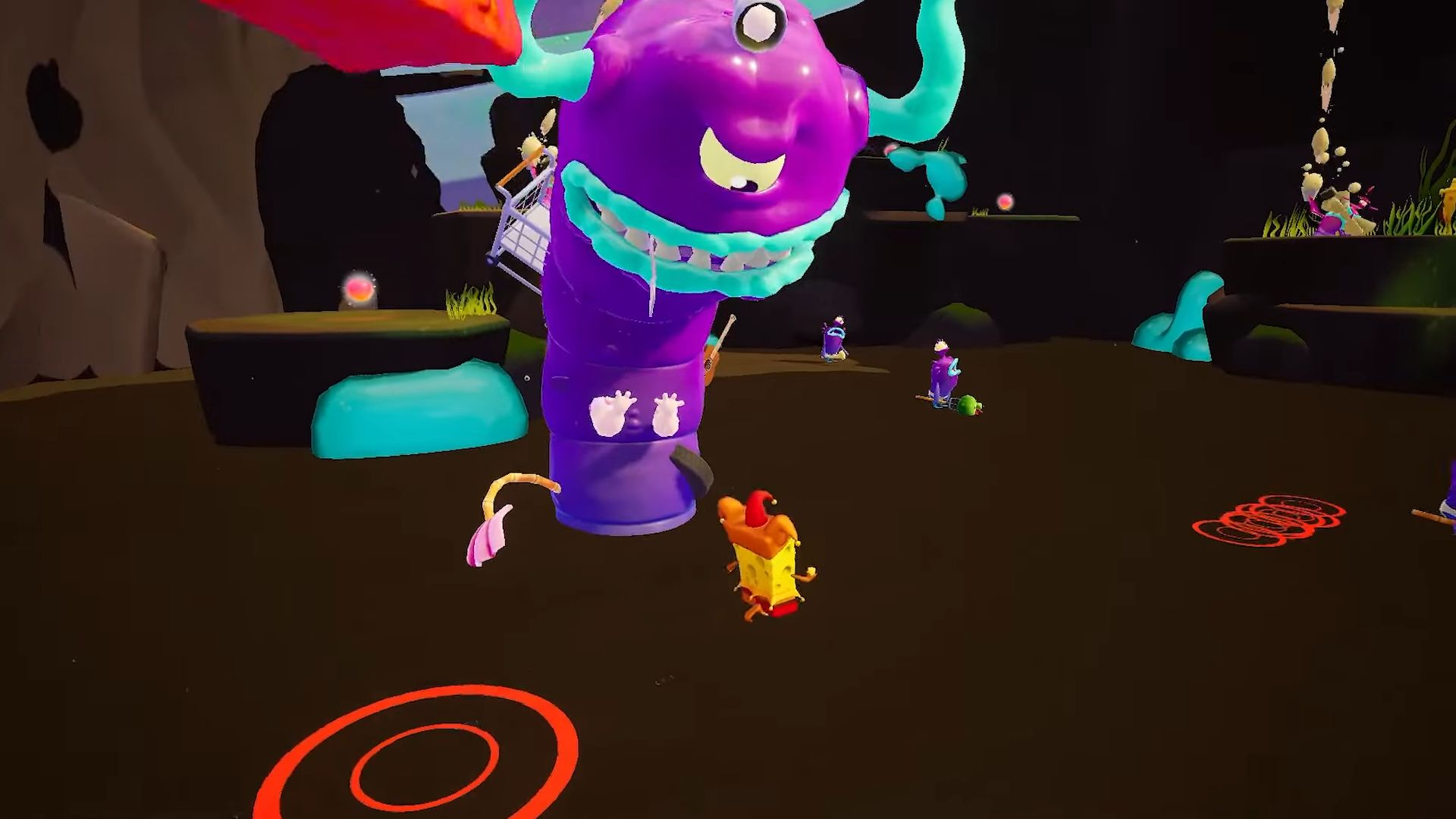
Screenshot showing SpongeBob fighting enemies

The Cosmic Shake is a 3D platformer. As SpongeBob, the player navigates through several distinctly themed worlds, known as "Wish Worlds" within the game, with the aid of Patrick, who has been transformed into a balloon. Throughout the game, SpongeBob learns a variety of combat and traversal abilities, including: Spin Attack, Glide, Karate Kick, and Fishhook Swing. Players obtain a variety of collectables throughout the game, such as: cosmic jelly, gold doubloons, golden underwear, golden spatulas, Plankton's pet Spot, and level-specific collectables for side-missions. None of the collectables are required to progress through the game's linear story, as the cosmic jelly and gold doubloons are only used to unlock costumes.

== Plot ==
During a visit to the Glove World theme park, SpongeBob and Patrick encounter Madame Kassandra, a mermaid fortune teller who sells them a bottle of "magic bubble soap" that can make their dreams come true. After purchasing the soap and returning home, SpongeBob blows bubbles to make his friends' dreams come true. Patrick then reads the bottle's label to find that it is actually a bottle of Mermaid Tears and is the property of King Neptune, not to be used by mortals. SpongeBob's bubbles then cause mayhem as it opens a portal and sucks up buildings and his friends into several "Wish Worlds" while covering Bikini Bottom in a substance called Cosmic Jelly, the building blocks of reality.

SpongeBob and Patrick, who has been transformed into a balloon, traverse through the seven Wish Worlds to save their friends and Bikini Bottom with the help of Madame Kassandra, who gives SpongeBob a cosmic costume for each respective world he visits in exchange for Cosmic Jelly, along with a magic bubble wand to transport his friends and buildings back to Bikini Bottom. Unbeknownst to SpongeBob and Patrick, Madame Kassandra has her own villainous intentions. Locations within the game include: Bikini Bottom, Wild West Jellyfish Fields, Karate Downtown Bikini Bottom, Pirate Goo Lagoon, Halloween Rock Bottom, Prehistoric Kelp Forest, Medieval Sulfur Fields, and Jelly Glove World.

After rescuing his friends and giving Kassandra jelly from all of the Wish Worlds, King Neptune intervenes and berates SpongeBob for unknowingly helping Kassandra in her plans, explaining that she stole the Bubble Soap from him, and that she never posed any real danger until SpongeBob helped her. Kassandra then traps Neptune and proclaims her plot to take over the ocean. Squidward interrupts and angrily yells at SpongeBob for everything that has happened to him. Kassandra uses the Cosmic Jelly to turn Squidward into a jelly monster called Jelly Squidward and uses him to try to destroy SpongeBob and Patrick. After defeating Kassandra and Jelly Squidward, Kassandra is banished through a portal, Squidward and Patrick are turned back to normal, and King Neptune is freed. In gratitude for saving everyone, King Neptune gives SpongeBob one wish, but Patrick wishes to "do everything all over again" despite the others' protests, bringing Bikini Bottom back to its chaotic state.

== Development ==
The Cosmic Shake was developed by Purple Lamp Studios, who had previously developed SpongeBob SquarePants: Battle for Bikini Bottom – Rehydrated (2020). The game was green-lit by Nickelodeon and THQ Nordic following the commercial success of Rehydrated. While Battle for Bikini Bottom has three playable characters, SpongeBob, Patrick, and Sandy, each with one or more special abilities, Purple Lamp decided to have SpongeBob be the only playable character in The Cosmic Shake and give him a lot of new abilities. These abilities included a new honing attack called the "Karate-kick" and gliding.

The developers focused on making the game more story-driven and fast-paced than its predecessor, as well as making players revisit challenges and missions more frequently. Unlockable costumes were made a core focus of the game. The game features voice-acting from the show's original cast, with Purple Lamp also working closely with writers from the series. The main worlds in the game were designed as twists on the worlds in Battle for Bikini Bottom and locations in the series, like a Wild West-themed Jellyfish Fields. Special focus was put on side quests and revisiting past locations in after particular achievements are unlocked. Additionally each world focuses on a particular gameplay theme, like more complex platforming in Prehistoric Kelp Forest and fighting in Karate Downtown Bikini Bottom. Madame Kassandra, a new character, was developed for the story of the game.

== Release ==
THQ Nordic first announced the game in September 2021, as a part of its tenth-anniversary showcase. A new trailer featuring gameplay was unveiled at the end of THQ Nordic's game showcase in August 2022. A playable demo of the game was presented at Gamescom 2022. Later in September, during a Nintendo Direct presentation, it was revealed that the game would release in 2023.

The Cosmic Shake was released for the Nintendo Switch, PlayStation 4, Windows, and Xbox One on January 31, 2023. A limited physical edition, the "BFF Edition", was released on all platforms, and includes a SpongeBob statue, an inflatable Patrick, an amulet with necklace, miniature bouncing balls, placemats, "Costume Pack" DLC, and a special box. In September 2023, THQ Nordic announced that the game would release for PlayStation 5 and Xbox Series X/S on October 16, 2023, before being delayed to October 23. Mobile versions for iOS and Android were announced in November and released on December 12, 2023.

== Reception ==
Reception

Aggregate score
Aggregator	Score
Metacritic	(NS) 73/100 (PC) 71/100 (PS4) 70/100 (XONE) 68/100

Review scores
Publication	Score
Destructoid	8/10
Digital Trends	3.5/5
Game Informer	7/10
GameSpot	7/10
IGN	5/10
Nintendo Life	8/10
Nintendo World Report	7.5/10
Push Square	6/10
Shacknews	8/10

SpongeBob SquarePants: The Cosmic Shake received "mixed or average" reviews from critics, according to review aggregator website Metacritic.

Destructoid praised the variety of the game, writing "Each world brings with it a unique feel and presentation, from chasing down some cosmetics in Medieval Sulfur Fields to setting up a light show in Halloween Rock Bottom".

=== Sales ===
According to GameSensor, over 60,000 players added The Cosmic Shake to their Steam accounts' wish list even a month before its release. It sold almost 50,000 units during the first month of release on Steam. The game reached tenth place on the sales chart in the United Kingdom.

In May 2023, Embracer Group (owner of THQ Nordic) stated that initial sales of the game were below expectations, but they expected it to "have a long tail of revenue".

== Future ==
A sequel, SpongeBob SquarePants: Titans of the Tide, was released in November 2025.
