= SpongeBob SquarePants: Titans of the Tide =

- Developer: Purple Lamp
- Publisher: THQ Nordic
- Series: SpongeBob SquarePants
- Engine: Unreal Engine 5
- Platforms: Nintendo Switch 2; PlayStation 5; Windows; Xbox Series X/S; Nintendo Switch
- Release: Switch 2, PS5, PC, Xbox; November 18, 2025; Nintendo Switch; October 13, 2026
- Genres: Platform, action-adventure
- Mode: Single-player

SpongeBob SquarePants: Titans of the Tide is a 2025 platform game developed by Purple Lamp and published by THQ Nordic. The game is based on the Nickelodeon animated series SpongeBob SquarePants and is a successor to SpongeBob SquarePants: The Cosmic Shake (2023). Players control SpongeBob and Patrick Star, who aim to solve a conflict between King Neptune and the Flying Dutchman.

Purple Lamp based their learnings on their previous SpongeBob titles when conceptualizing and developing Titans of the Tides. Focus was put on the theme of duality, with the player having the ability to swap between SpongeBob and Patrick on the fly, and platforming puzzles being designed around this gimmick. Titans of the Tide was released for Nintendo Switch 2, PlayStation 5, Windows, and Xbox Series X/S on November 18, 2025, and received positive reviews from critics. A port for Nintendo Switch released on October 13, 2026.

== Gameplay ==
SpongeBob SquarePants: Titans of the Tide stars SpongeBob SquarePants and Patrick Star, whom the player controls by swapping between the two. The player completes platforming challenges by swapping on the fly based on which abilities are required in certain areas.

== Development ==
SpongeBob SquarePants: Titans of the Tide is the third SpongeBob SquarePants video game developed by Purple Lamp following SpongeBob SquarePants: Battle for Bikini Bottom – Rehydrated (2020) and SpongeBob SquarePants: The Cosmic Shake (2023). Purple Lamp based their learnings on both titles when conceptualizing and developing Titans of the Tides. When crafting the game, focus was put on the theme of duality. This can be observed in the two playable characters, SpongeBob and Patrick, and the antagonists, King Neptune and the Flying Dutchman.

With The Cosmic Shake, Purple Lamp highlighted the fidelity of the gameplay and chose to do away with having Patrick and Sandy being playable character as in Battle for Bikini Bottom. In Titans of the Tide, they brought back Patrick as a playable character, expanded his skillset, and introduced the ability to switch between him and SpongeBob seamlessly in gameplay. This allowed for them to design unique platforming challenges and puzzles that required players to use both character's abilities on the fly. Special care was put into making sure the depictions of the characters was faithful to their appearances in the series. Story development began with the premise of the Krusty Krab having a 50% discount.

== Release ==
In October 2024, THQ Nordic released a Halloween-themed promotional video on YouTube featuring SpongeBob SquarePants: Battle for Bikini Bottom – Rehydrated. The video teased an upcoming sequel, showcasing playable versions of SpongeBob and Patrick one of whom appeared in a ghost-like form, hinting at a supernatural theme. SpongeBob SquarePants: Titans of the Tide was officially announced in August 2025 by Purple Lamp and THQ Nordic. The announcement trailer featured David Hasselhoff, who previously appeared in The SpongeBob SquarePants Movie (2004). The game was released for Nintendo Switch 2, PlayStation 5, Windows, and Xbox Series X/S on November 18, 2025. On March 18, 2026, THQ Nordic announced a port to Nintendo Switch for a release on October 13, 2026.

== Reception ==
Reception

Aggregate scores
| Aggregator | Score |
|---|---|
| Metacritic | 72/100 (PS5); 77/100 (XSXS); 79/100 (PC) |
| OpenCritic | 67% recommended |

Review scores
| Publication | Score |
|---|---|
| Famitsu | 32/40 |
| Nintendo Life | 7/10 |
| Push Square | 7/10 |

SpongeBob SquarePants: Titans of the Tide received "generally favorable" reviews from critics for the Windows and Xbox Series X/S versions, while the PlayStation 5 version received "mixed or average" reviews, according to review aggregator website Metacritic. Fellow review aggregator OpenCritic assessed that the game received strong approval, being recommended by 67% of critics. In Japan, four critics from Famitsu gave the game a total score of 32 out of 40, with each critic awarding the game an 8 out of 10.
