= Cartoon Network Shorts Department =

- Created by: Cartoon Network Studios
- Countries of origin: United States; Australia
- Original language: English

Production
- Executive producers: Brian A. Miller (2013-2020); Jennifer Pelphrey (2013-2020); Rob Sorcher (2013-2020); Curtis Lelash (2013–2018); Mike Roth (2017–2018); Nick Jennings (2018–2021); Tramm Wigzell (2018–2020); Sam Register (2020-2021)
- Producers: Nate Funaro (2013–2017); Scott Malchus (2017–2021); Sophia Monico (2019–2021); Jackie Buscarino (2021); Ryan Slater (2021)

Original release
- Release: May 21, 2013

Related
- What a Cartoon!; The Cartoonstitute; Cartoon Cartoons; List of titles: Steven Universe; Clarence; Over the Garden Wall; We Bare Bears; Long Live the Royals; OK K.O.! Let's Be Heroes; Apple & Onion; Craig of the Creek; Summer Camp Island; Victor and Valentino; Infinity Train; Tig n' Seek; The Fungies!; Invincible Fight Girl

Cartoon Network Shorts Department is the channel's artist development program for animated pilots that are created at Cartoon Network Studios. It was inaugurated and started in 2013 through online uploading of six titles, on May 21 for a short period, which three of them have been greenlit for a TV series at the start of the program.

The shorts program has since been superseded by the Cartoon Cartoons shorts program introduced in 2021. Nevertheless, a couple of shorts produced from 2017 to 2021 were released under the Cartoon Cartoons label.

The short Mushroom and the Forest of the World was nominated for a Daytime Emmy Award for Outstanding Short Format Children's Program.

== List of pilots ==
=== United States ===
Title	Created by	Original premiere(s)	Animation by
Clarence	Skyler Page	May 21, 2013 (Online); February 17, 2014 (TV)	Saerom Animation
Lakewood Plaza Turbo / OK K.O.! Let's Be Heroes	Ian Jones-Quartey	May 21, 2013 (Online)	Sunmin Image Pictures
Mars Safari!	Ghostshrimp	May 21, 2013 (Online)	Eric Pringle and Nick Bertonazzi Jr.
My Science Fiction Project	Audie Harrison	May 21, 2013 (Online)	Rough Draft Korea
Paranormal Roommates	Benton Connor	May 21, 2013 (Online)	Saerom Animation
Steven Universe: "The Time Thing"	Rebecca Sugar	May 21, 2013 (Online)	Rough Draft Korea
Tome of the Unknown: "Harvest Melody" / Over the Garden Wall	Patrick McHale	September 9, 2013 (LA Shorts Fest); May 18, 2015 (Online)	Rough Draft Korea
AJ's Infinite Summer	Toby Jones	May 16, 2014 (Online)	Rough Draft Korea
Long Live the Royals	Sean Szeles	May 16, 2014 (Online)	Saerom Animation
We Bare Bears	Daniel Chong	May 21, 2014 (KLIK! Festival); August 25, 2015 (TV)	Saerom Animation
Back to Backspace	Dominic Bisignano and Amalia Levari	November 12, 2014 (Online)	Rough Draft Korea
Pillywags Mansion (Note: Only puppet show/animated pilot of the program and the entire Cartoon Network Studios filmography.)	Sam Marin	November 12, 2014 (Online)	Swazzle
Jammers	Lizz Hickey	May 18, 2015 (Online)	John Berry, Sarah Gencarelli, Sara Pocock, Sarah Ramert and Tom Riffel
Ridin' with Burgess	Andres Salaff	May 18, 2015 (Online)	Sunmin Image Pictures
Twelve Forever (Note: This pilot was greenlit as a series by Netflix.)	Julia Vickerman	May 18, 2015 (Online)	Sunmin Image Pictures
Apple & Onion	George Gendi	June 18, 2015 (Annecy Festival); May 2, 2016 (Online); May 14, 2016 (TV)	John Berry, Hozen Britto, Sarah Gencarelli, Bishoy Gendi, Sara Pocock, Sarah Ramert and Tom Riffel
Welcome to My Life	Elizabeth Ito	June 18, 2015 (Annecy Festival); April 7, 2017 (Online)	TeamTO
Bottom's Butte	Minty Lewis	November 20, 2015 (CTN Expo); May 2, 2016 (Online)	Digital eMation
Danger Planet (Note: Label only; produced as part of The Cartoonstitute.)	Derek Drymon	January 19, 2016 (Online)	Rough Draft Korea
Summer Camp Island	Julia Pott	March 17, 2016 (SXSW Festival); December 2, 2017 (CN App); April 25, 2018 (Online)	Rough Draft Korea
Victor and Valentino	Diego Molano	October 29, 2016 (TV); November 1, 2016 (Online)	Sunmin Image Pictures
Infinity Train	Owen Dennis	November 1, 2016 (VOD); November 2, 2016 (Online); February 11, 2017 (TV)	Sunmin Image Pictures
Legendary Place	Calvin Wong	March 4, 2017 (GLAS Festival); November 9, 2018 (Online)	Saerom Animation
The Fancies: "Fancytown"/"The Beach" /"Run Pam Run"/"Sir Tree" / The Fungies (Note: Despite these two pilots have being greenlit by Cartoon Network, their series move to premiering on HBO Max.)	Stephen P. Neary	July 30, 2017 (ABP Festival); May 8, 2019 (Online)	Saerom Animation
Unlovable (Note: Released under the Cartoon Cartoons label.) (Note: Based on the comic strip of the same name.)	Esther Pearl Watson and Mark Todd	August 11, 2017 (HollyShorts Festival); August 10, 2026 (Online)	Rough Draft Korea
Tiggle Winks / Tig n' Seek	Myke Chilian	November 24, 2017 (CN App); January 8, 2018 (Online)	Rough Draft Korea
Craig of the Creek	Matt Burnett and Ben Levin	December 1, 2017 (CN App)	Rough Draft Korea
Mushroom and the Forest of the World	Madeleine Flores and J. Smith	October 14, 2018 (KLIK! Festival); April 26, 2019 (Online)	MUA Film
Sunshine Brownstone	Audie Harrison	November 17, 2018 (Online)	Iana Kushchenko, Nate Lowe, Sarah Ramert and Adam Scarpitta
Pops & Branwell (Note: Based off the children's book series of the same name.)	Pete Toms and Aleks Sennwald	January 27, 2019 (CFF Seattle); December 14, 2019 (Online)	Rough Draft Korea
Splitting Time	Gleb Sanchez-Lobashov	February 16, 2019 (BAICFF); December 21, 2019 (Online)	Saerom Animation
The Wonderful Wingits	Leticia Abreu Silva	February 16, 2019 (BAICFF); July 20, 2020 (Online)	MUA Film
Outrun Express	Jeremy Polgar	June 3, 2019 (Animatic)	N/A
Cadette in Charge	Henrique Jardim	February 6, 2020 (Online)	Saerom Animation
Trick Moon	Geneva Hodgson	July 21, 2020 (Online)	Digital eMation
Beetle + Bean	Nick Edwards	July 22, 2020 (Online)	Saerom Animation
Genie Hunters	Mike Milo	December 16, 2020 (Animatic)	Inspidea
Wild Help (Note: Stop-motion)	Niki Yang	January 1, 2021 (Online)	In Efecto Animation Studio
Bird & Squirrel (Note: Based off the children's book series of the same name.)	James Burks	February 18, 2021 (CFF Seattle); February 25, 2024 (Workprint); February 16, 2026 (Online)	Studio Redfrog
Spirit Link	André LaMilza	October 5, 2023 (Workprint)	Takafumi Hori, Tiger Animation and André LaMilza
The Nonsense Tales of Alakasam!	Kyle Arneson and Aaron Preacher	May 4, 2025 (Workprint)	Ancient Order of the Wooden Skull
Afternoon Super	Ben Crouse and Jacob Sluka	February 9, 2026 (Online)	Rough Draft Korea
Greetings from Samson (Note: Based on the webcomic Samson at Work.)	Tiffany Ford	March 30, 2026 (Online)	Rough Draft Korea
OutRunners	Ashe Jacobson and Adam Ganse	June 8, 2026 (Online)	Tiger Animation
Turtle Rock	Jeff Liu	August 3, 2026 (Online)	Sunmin Image Pictures
The Invincible Fight Girl: Legend of the Swole / Invincible Fight Girl	Juston Gordon-Montgomery	TBD	

=== International ===
Since 2016, the program has begun to expand to other countries where Cartoon Network Studios accept to commission (but not produce) those local short pilots, and the only title to be noticed in this process is Lasso & Comet.

Title	Created by	Country of origin	Co-production(s)	Original premiere(s)
Lasso & Comet	Ivan Dixon Developed by: Greg Sharp and Ivan Dixon	Australia	Rubber House; Cartoon Network Asia Pacific	November 9, 2016 (Online)

=== Unproduced ===
These are shorts that were either never released to the public or were cancelled during production.

Title	Created by
Paradise is for the Birds	Brett Varon
Badass Babies (Note: Computer animation using motion capture)	Zach Smith
HUE Chroma Warriors	Eric Trueheart
Kelvin Enus: Rent-a-Genius	John McNamee
Stinkalina	Eva Konstantopoulos and Jon Burgerman
Study Hallers	Ben Adams
Best Coast	Pedro Eboli and Mark Satterthwaite
Mikki and the Soca Teens	TBD
Seed Scouts	TBD
Tag Team! Legends of the Ring	TBD
The Kazoodles!	TBD

== See also ==
- Nickelodeon Animated Shorts Program - the Nickelodeon counterpart of the program.
