= Nick Cross (animator) =

Canadian animator

Nick Cross is a Canadian animator, artist, cartoonist, director, writer, and producer based in Los Angeles, California. His works include The Waif of Persephone, Yellow Cake, Pig Farmer, and Black Sunrise, which he wrote, directed, animated and produced. He is friends with graphic novel artist Troy Little and they collaborated on the development of the animated series Angora Napkin. He directed the pilot for the Nickelodeon series Pig Goat Banana Cricket created by graphic novel creator Dave Cooper and alternative comics creator Johnny Ryan. He was the double Emmy winning art director for the Cartoon Network acclaimed miniseries Over the Garden Wall as well as the network's shorts development program. He was the supervising producer on the Cartoon Network and HBO Max series Tig n' Seek.

He is married to cartoonist and comedian Marlo Meekins.

== Black Sunrise ==
Black Sunrise is a planned feature film, produced and animated entirely by Nick Cross. Cross began the film before the rise in popularity of the internet, at which time he considered notions like the Illuminati and secret societies more mysterious and interesting to the general public than they are today. After completing 15 minutes of animation, time constraints prevented Cross from continuing his work on the film. Cross believes that the film, if completed, will not be received favorably because the topic of secret societies is overexposed, but he might still release segments of the film.

== Filmography ==
| Year | Title | Credit | Notes | Ref. |
|---|---|---|---|---|
| 1997 | Rupert | layout artist | 13 episodes | |
| 2001–2003 | Untalkative Bunny | storyboard artist | | |
| 2001 | The Red Scarf | producer, writer, animator, director | | |
| 2001–2002 | The Ripping Friends | model clean-up | | |
| 2003 | Ren & Stimpy "Adult Party Cartoon" | art director, background designer, storyboard artist | | |
| 2006 | Tenacious D - "Classico" | background artist | | |
| 2006 | The Waif of Persephone | producer, writer, animator, director | | |
| 2007 | Wayside | storyboard artist | 2 episodes | |
| 2008 | Danko Jones - "King of Magazines" | animator, co-director | Collaboration with Dave Cooper and Steve Stefanelli | |
| 2009 | Jimmy Two-Shoes | storyboard artist | "Meet the Gnomans" | |
| 2009 | Yellow Cake | producer, writer, animator, director | | |
| 2010 | Spliced | storyboard artist | "Sgt. Snuggums" | |
| 2010 | Angora Napkin | creator, designer, animator, storyboard artist, background artist, layout artist, director | Co-created by Troy Little | |
| 2010–2011 | Babar and the Adventures of Badou | storyboard artist | 15 episodes | |
| 2011 | The Pig Farmer | producer, writer, animator, director | | |
| 2012 | Pig Goat Banana Mantis! | animator, director | | |
| 2013 | Scaredy Squirrel | storyboard artist | "Captain Nuts" | |
| 2013 | Perihelion | animator, director | | |
| 2013 | The Day My Butt Went Psycho! | storyboard artist | | |
| 2013 | Tome of the Unknown | background painter | Short forCartoon Network Shorts Department Nick Cross awarded Emmy for Outstanding Individual Achievement in Animation. | |
| 2014 | Over the Garden Wall | art director | Nick Cross awarded Emmy for Outstanding Individual Achievement in Animation. | |
| 2014 | Back to Backspace | art director | Short for Cartoon Network Shorts Department | |
| 2015 | The SpongeBob Movie: Sponge Out of Water | storyboard artist | Time travel sequence | |
| 2015 | Jammers | art director | Short for Cartoon Network Shorts Department | |
| 2015 | Ridin' with Burgess | art director | Short for Cartoon Network Shorts Department | |
| 2015 | Twelve Forever | art director, background designer | Short for Cartoon Network Shorts Department | |
| 2015 | Uncle Grandpa | animator, storyboard artist, director | Bumpers in "Guest Directed Shorts" | |
| 2015 | Uncle Grandpa | background painter | "The Great Spaghetti Western" | |
| 2015 | Pig Goat Banana Cricket | storyboard artist, director | "Pig Goat Banana Cricket High Five!" | |
| 2015 | Apple & Onion | art director | Short for Cartoon Network Shorts Department | |
| 2015 | Welcome to My Life | art director, background painter | Short for Cartoon Network Shorts Department | |
| 2015 | Long Live the Royals | character design | 2 episodes | |
| 2016 | Bottom's Butte | art director, prop designer | Short for Cartoon Network Shorts Department | |
| 2016 | Infinity Train | art director, prop designer | Short for Cartoon Network Shorts Department | |
| 2016 | Summer Camp Island | art director | Short for Cartoon Network Shorts Department | |
| 2016 | Victor and Valentino | art director | Short for Cartoon Network Shorts Department | |
| 2017 | The Fancies | art director, prop designer | Short for Cartoon Network Shorts Department | |
| 2017 | Legendary Place | art director, prop designer, background designer | Short for Cartoon Network Shorts Department | |
| 2017 | Tiggle Winks | art director, prop designer, background painter | Short for Cartoon Network Shorts Department | |
| 2017 | Craig of the Creek | art director, prop designer, background designer, background painter | Short for Cartoon Network Shorts Department | |
| 2018 | Mushroom and the Forest of the World | art director, prop designer, background designer | Short for Cartoon Network Shorts Department | |
| 2018 | Sunshine Brownstone | art director, character designer, prop designer, color key, background designer, background painter | Short for Cartoon Network Shorts Department | |
| 2018 | Steamboat Willie Redux | animator, director, art director, character designer, prop designer, color key, background designer, background painter | Small animation for Steamboat Willie re-animation project by Disney Consumer Products | |
| 2019 | Pops & Branwell | art director, prop designer | Short for Cartoon Network Shorts Department | |
| 2019 | Splitting Time | art director, prop designer, background painter | Short for Cartoon Network Shorts Department | |
| 2020 | Cadette in Charge | art director, prop designer | Short for Cartoon Network Shorts Department | |
| 2020 | Tig n' Seek | supervising producer | | |
| 2021 | Bone | co-executive producer | Cancelled in 2022 by Netflix Animation | |
| 2022–2024 | Smiling Friends | concept artist, background designer | 2 episodes | |
| 2026 | Cartoon Cartoons | character designer, additional animation | 2 episodes | |
