= Cartoon Cartoons =

Collective name used by Cartoon Network for original animated series

The Cartoon Cartoons logo, used for the Latin American version of Cartoon Cartoon Fridays

Cartoon Cartoons is a collective name used by Cartoon Network for their original animated television series from July 14, 1997, to June 14, 2004, and produced primarily by Hanna-Barbera and later Cartoon Network Studios. The first Cartoon Cartoon, Dexter's Laboratory, premiered in 1996, a year before the moniker's introduction. Further original series followed: Johnny Bravo, Cow and Chicken, I Am Weasel, The Powerpuff Girls, Ed, Edd n Eddy, Mike, Lu & Og, Courage the Cowardly Dog, Sheep in the Big City, Time Squad, Grim & Evil (later split into The Grim Adventures of Billy & Mandy and Evil Con Carne), Whatever Happened to... Robot Jones?, and Codename: Kids Next Door.

Originally, Cartoon Network mainly focused its programming on reruns of older animated series which it had acquired through its parent company's film library, but soon began to introduce more original programming. The Cartoon Cartoons originated with Fred Seibert's animation anthology series What a Cartoon! (1995), an animation showcase series featuring pilots of original cartoon ideas submitted by independent animators. Dexter's Laboratory was the first such pilot to be greenlit by the network for a full series in 1996. After other pilots were successfully produced into their own series, including Cow and Chicken, Johnny Bravo, and The Powerpuff Girls, the collective Cartoon Cartoons were featured on the network's Friday night programming block, Cartoon Cartoon Fridays from 1999 to 2003. Not all CN original series created around this time were officially recognized as Cartoon Cartoons; Samurai Jack, for example, did not bear the moniker.

The moniker was retired by the network in 2004, and its last surviving series, Ed, Edd n Eddy, ended in 2009 after a ten-year run. Since their heyday, reruns of the Cartoon Cartoons continued to air on The Cartoon Cartoon Show (2005–2008) and Cartoon Planet (2012–2014). In 2021, the name was resurrected by the network for a new shorts program on YouTube.

== History ==
Cartoon Cartoons first appeared as shorts on animation showcase series What a Cartoon! in 1995, under the name of World Premiere Toons. The series was produced by Hanna-Barbera and Cartoon Network Studios under the direction of Fred Seibert. Seibert had been a guiding force for Nickelodeon (having overseen the creation of Nicktoons shortly prior to his departure) prior to joining Hanna-Barbera and would establish Frederator Studios years later.

Through What a Cartoon!, Cartoon Network was able to assess the potential of certain shorts to serve as pilots for spin-off series and signed contracts with their creators to create ongoing series. Dexter's Laboratory was the most popular short series according to a vote held in 1995, and became a full series in 1996. Dexter was retroactively labeled the first Cartoon Cartoon in 1997; however, the network's previous original shows, The Moxy Show and Space Ghost Coast to Coast, were not retroactively given the label.

The Cartoon Cartoon brand was first introduced in July 1997 for the network's Cartoon Cartoon Weekend block. Two more series based on shorts debuted in 1997: Johnny Bravo and Cow and Chicken. I Am Weasel, which aired as segments on Cow and Chicken, was spun off into its own series in 1999. These were followed by The Powerpuff Girls in late 1998 and Ed, Edd n Eddy in early 1999. Mike, Lu & Og and Courage the Cowardly Dog premiered in November 1999, creating a lineup of critically acclaimed shows. From 1999 to 2003, the Cartoon Cartoon Fridays block was the network's marquee night for premieres of new episodes and series.

In 2001, the network received Time Squad and Grim & Evil. In 2002, Codename: Kids Next Door became a full series after being chosen in the previous year's Big Pick Weekend. In 2003, Grim & Evil was split into The Grim Adventures of Billy & Mandy and Evil Con Carne; they were the last original series to officially carry the Cartoon Cartoon branding before it was discontinued.

The Cartoon Cartoons were intended to appeal to a wider audience than the average Saturday-morning cartoon. Linda Simensky, vice president of original animation, reminded adults and teenage girls that the cartoons could appeal to them as well. Kevin Sandler's article on them claimed that these cartoons were both less "bawdy" than their counterparts at Comedy Central and less "socially responsible" than their counterparts at Nickelodeon. Sandler pointed to the whimsical rebelliousness, high rate of exaggeration and self-consciousness of the overall output which each individual series managed.

In October 2003, the live-action Fridays premiered on the network as a replacement for Cartoon Cartoon Fridays. The Cartoon Cartoons bumpers (that appeared before and after episodes of its original series) were dropped after the network's CN City rebrand on June 14, 2004. In November 2004, the block Cartoon Cartoons: The Top 5 was renamed to simply The Top 5. Cartoon Network still kept the Cartoon Cartoons name around in various forms applying to their older series (such as for The Cartoon Cartoon Show from 2005 to 2008), but since newer shows such as Foster's Home for Imaginary Friends and Camp Lazlo were stylistically different from previous shows, the moniker was not applied to them.

=== Revival ===
Cartoon Cartoons
- Created by: Cartoon Network Studios
- Country of origin: United States
- Original language: English
- No. of episodes: 30

Production
- Executive producers: Pete Browngardt; Aminder Dhaliwal; Katie Rice; Nick Jennings; Sam Register
- Producer: Scott Malchus
- Running time: 2–11 minutes
- Production company: Cartoon Network Studios

Original release
- Network: YouTube
- Release: January 26 – August 17, 2026

Related
- What a Cartoon!; The Cartoonstitute; Cartoon Network Shorts Department

On April 15, 2021, Cartoon Network announced a new iteration of the Cartoon Cartoons shorts program. On November 24, 2021, the first new Cartoon Cartoons shorts were announced. The first nine shorts include Accordions Geoffrey & Mary Melodica by Louie Zong (of The Ghost and Molly McGee and We Bare Bears), Dang! It's Dracula by Levon Jihanian (of Tig n' Seek), Hungy Ghost by Jesse Moynihan (of Adventure Time), Fruit Stand at the End of the World by Rachel Liu, Off the Menu by Shavonne Cherry (of Ren & Stimpy and The Looney Tunes Show), Harmony in Despair by Andrew Dickman (of Looney Tunes Cartoons), Unravel by Alexis Sugden, Mouthwash Madness by Lisa Vandenberg (of Animaniacs), and Scaredy Cat by JJ Villard (of King Star King).

On June 7, 2022, more Cartoon Cartoons were announced. The next seven shorts include The All-Nimal by Nick Edwards (of Apple & Onion and The Fungies!), Buttons' Gamezone by Fernando Puig (of The Cuphead Show!, Middlemost Post and Tig n' Seek), Tib Tub, We Need You by Sean Godsey and Mike Rosenthal, I Love You Jocelyn by Tracey Laguerre, Pig in a Wig by Sam Marin (of Regular Show), The Good Boy Report (based on the webcomic of the same name) by Kasey Williams (of Niko and the Sword of Light and Harley Quinn) and Maude Macher and Dom Duck by Kali Fontecchio (of The Looney Tunes Show and Jellystone!).

On March 21, 2024, GiAnna Ligammari (of Niko and the Sword of Light and Inside Job) announced a Cartoon Cartoons short ISCREAM created by her. Four days after, the short was announced as being completed. Violane Briat (of Craig of the Creek and The Loud House) would also announce a Cartoon Cartoons short, Madison and Skylar created by her. The shorts were showcased in a screening on April 25, 2024. The short The All-Nimal was shown at the Annecy International Animation Film Festival on June 11, 2024. A panel for the shorts was also hosted at San Diego Comic-Con on July 25, 2025.

In addition to the aforementioned shorts, six more unannounced shorts, A For Angel by Chime Merra, Duck by Mic Graves and Tony Hull (both of The Amazing World of Gumball and Elliott from Earth), Foools by Seo Kim (of Adventure Time) and Steve Manale (of Summer Camp Island), Mandie Mander by Nick Bachman (of Sanjay and Craig and Yo Gabba Gabba!), Sleeping Giants by Maha Tabikh (of Apple and Onion and Pinky Malinky), and The Journey to Donut Palace by Somvilay Xayaphone (of Adventure Time and Summer Camp Island) were revealed and completed by 2023-2024, with footage and art being leaked online.

These Cartoon Cartoons shorts were never aired on Cartoon Network, and initially, the studio had no plans to release them after production of new shorts ceased in 2024. However, Warner Bros. Television's YouTube channel began to release the shorts every Monday, starting with A For Angel on January 26, 2026. Warner Bros. TV's YouTube channel also used the Cartoon Cartoons label to release shorts previously unreleased from Cartoon Network Shorts Department produced from 2017 to 2021 including Afternoon Super by Ben Crouse (of Pickle and Peanut and Young Love) and Jacob Sluka (of Close Enough), Bird & Squirrel by James Burks (of Wow! Wow! Wubbzy! and Ni Hao, Kai-Lan), Greetings from Samson by Tiffany Ford (of Craig of the Creek and Steven Universe), OutRunners by Ashe Jacobson and Adam Ganse (of Glitch Techs), Turtle Rock by Jeff Liu (of Steven Universe) and Unlovable by Esther Pearl Watson and Mark Todd.

==== List of shorts ====
Title	Created by	Original premiere(s)	Running time	Animation by
A For Angel	Chime Merra	January 26, 2026 (Online)	7 minutes	Saerom Animation
Accordions Geoffrey & Mary Melodica (Note: Computer animation) (Note: Based on the web series of the same name.)	Louie Zong	February 2, 2026 (Online)	2 minutes	Louie Zong
Afternoon Super (Note: Label only; produced as part of Cartoon Network Shorts Department.)	Ben Crouse and Jacob Sluka	February 9, 2026 (Online)	10 minutes	Rough Draft Korea
Bird & Squirrel (Note: Based off the children's book series of the same name.)	James Burks	February 18, 2021 (CFF Seattle); February 25, 2024 (Workprint); February 16, 2026 (Online)	8 minutes	Studio Redfrog
Buttons' Gamezone	Fernando Puig	February 23, 2026 (Online)	7 minutes	Sunmin Image Pictures
Dang! It's Dracula	Levon Jihanian	March 2, 2026 (Online)	6 minutes	Sunmin Image Pictures
Duck (Note: Adult animation)	Mic Graves and Tony Hull	March 9, 2026 (Online)	8 minutes	Saffronic and Nancy Parczyk
Foools (Note: Stop-motion animation mixed with computer animation) (Note: Preschool short)	Seo Kim and Steve Manale	March 16, 2026 (Online)	8 minutes	Louie Zong, Nick Cross, Seo Kim and Nick Jennings
Fruit Stand at the End of the World	Rachel Liu	March 23, 2026 (Online)	2 minutes	Rachel Liu and Jason Merrin
Greetings from Samson (Note: Based on the webcomic Samson at Work.)	Tiffany Ford	March 30, 2026 (Online)	8 minutes	Rough Draft Korea
Harmony in Despair	Andrew Dickman	April 6, 2026 (Online)	7 minutes	Yowza! Animation
Hungy Ghost	Jesse Moynihan	April 13, 2026 (Online)	7 minutes	Saerom Animation
I Love You, Jocelyn	Tracey Laguerre	April 20, 2026 (Online)	7 minutes	Saerom Animation
ISCREAM	GiAnna Ligammari	April 27, 2026 (Online)	7 minutes	Saerom Animation
Madison and Skylar	Violaine Briat	May 4, 2026 (Online)	7 minutes	Victor Courtright
Mandie Mander	Nick Bachman	May 11, 2026 (Online)	7 minutes	Edward Artinian, Ye Aung and Hal Newman
Maude Macher and Dom Duck	Kali Fontecchio	May 18, 2026 (Online)	2 minutes	Saerom Animation
Mouthwash Madness	Lisa Vandenberg	May 25, 2026 (Online)	7 minutes	Saerom Animation
Off the Menu	Shavonne Cherry	June 1, 2026 (Online)	7 minutes	Yowza! Animation
OutRunners	Ashe Jacobson and Adam Ganse	June 8, 2026 (Online)	8 minutes	Tiger Animation
Pig in a Wig	Sam Marin	June 15, 2026 (Online)	7 minutes	Saerom Animation
Scaredy Cat	JJ Villard	June 22, 2026 (Online)	7 minutes	Weird Beard, Inc.
Sleeping Giants	Maha Tabikh	June 29, 2026 (Online)	7 minutes	Saerom Animation
The All-Nimal	Nick Edwards	June 11, 2024 (Annecy); July 6, 2026 (Online)	6 minutes	Saerom Animation, Nick Edwards and Dominik Johann
The Good Boy Report	Kasey Williams	July 13, 2026 (Online)	2 minutes	Abby Goss
The Journey to Donut Palace	Somvilay Xayaphone	July 20, 2026 (Online)	7 minutes	Saerom Animation
Tib Tub, We Need You!	Sean Godsey and Mike Rosenthal	July 27, 2026 (Online)	7 minutes	Saerom Animation
Turtle Rock	Jeff Liu	August 3, 2026 (Online)	10 minutes	Sunmin Image Pictures
Unlovable (Note: Based on the comic strip of the same name.)	Esther Pearl Watson and Mark Todd	August 10, 2026 (Online)	11 minutes	Rough Draft Korea
Unravel	Alexis Sugden	August 17, 2026 (Online)	2 minutes	Alexis Sugden

== Promotions ==
In June 1999, Cartoon Network began promoting its Cartoon Cartoons lineup with an advertising campaign to draw in viewership for its new Friday-night block Cartoon Cartoon Fridays, which was targeted toward viewers aged 6 to 11. Marketing included brand partnerships with General Mills, Hasbro, and Pepperidge Farm as well as an on-air sweepstakes and an 11-market live touring event. Advertisements appeared on television, radio, online, in movie theaters, at Six Flags theme parks, and billboards among other media with the tagline "You with us?".

In mid-2000, Cartoon Network promoted its original programming by launching the Cartoon Cartoon Friday Tour 2000, a live event that ran for 10 weeks across 13 cities. Active during weekdays in the lead-up to its Friday-night block, the tour cost a reported $25 million and reached a collective audience 16.2 million. It was sponsored by Coca-Cola's Hi-C and was created in partnership with Adelphia, AT&T, Cablevision, Charter Broadcasting, Comcast, Cox Cable, MediaOne, and Time Warner Cable. Launched as part of a three-part Cartoon Network marketing campaign occurring at different parts of the year, Cartoon Cartoon Friday Tour 2000 ended on September 1, 2000.

In March 2000, Cartoon Network ran an advertisement on other networks, including rival channel Nickelodeon, featuring different Cartoon Cartoons characters persuading viewers to switch channels and watch Cartoon Cartoon Fridays. The advertisement is set against an orange backdrop, Nickelodeon's signature color. Time Warner City Cable withdrew the commercial from local broadcast stations in New York due to its perceived inappropriateness for children.

== Programming blocks ==
More shows premiered bearing the Cartoon Cartoons brand, airing throughout the network's schedule and prominently on Cartoon Cartoon Fridays, which became the marquee night for premieres of new episodes and shows beginning June 11, 1999. It initially aired from 7:30 PM to 11:00 PM (Eastern Time) on Friday nights. The block was expanded from three and a half hours to four hours with the November 1999 premieres of Mike, Lu & Og and Courage the Cowardly Dog.

On June 9, 2000, Cartoon Cartoon Fridays launched with a new lineup and quickly garnered increased ratings for the channel. The block's format featured a different character from a Cartoon Cartoon series hosting each week, with the first host being Eustace from Courage the Cowardly Dog. The June 9 broadcast also began the first week of The Big Pick, a showcase of cartoon pilots that could become full series based on the results of an online viewer poll. A similar event, The Big Pick II, aired the following year.

On October 3, 2003, following a months-long switch to Summer Fridays and Cartoon Network's Fridays, CCF was rebooted under a hybrid live-action format as simply Fridays. The block was hosted by Tommy Snider and Nzinga Blake, the latter of whom was later replaced by Tara Sands. It aired shows outside the Cartoon Cartoon moniker, such as Foster's Home for Imaginary Friends, Hi Hi Puffy AmiYumi, The Life and Times of Juniper Lee, Camp Lazlo, My Gym Partner's a Monkey, Squirrel Boy, and Class of 3000. The last airing of Fridays was on February 23, 2007.

Cartoon Cartoons: The Top 5 (simply retitled The Top 5 in 2004), an hour-long program featuring a countdown of the week's five "best" Cartoon Cartoon episodes from the network's lineup, ran from 2002 to 2008. From 2005 to 2008, the Cartoon Cartoons label was primarily used for The Cartoon Cartoon Show, a half-hour program featuring episodes of older Cartoon Cartoons that were no longer shown regularly on the network.

The block Cartoon Planet was revived on Cartoon Network from 2012 to 2014, airing in a format similar to The Cartoon Cartoon Show. It featured Cartoon Cartoons such as Dexter's Laboratory, Johnny Bravo, Cow and Chicken, I Am Weasel, The Powerpuff Girls, Courage the Cowardly Dog, Ed, Edd n Eddy, Codename: Kids Next Door, The Grim Adventures of Billy & Mandy, and other original Cartoon Network Studios series such as Foster's Home for Imaginary Friends, Camp Lazlo, and Chowder.

Title	Year(s) aired	Note(s)
Cartoon Cartoons	1997–2004	
Cartoon Cartoon Weekend	1997–2002	
Cartoon Cartoon Fridays	1999–2003	
Cartoon Cartoon of the Day	1999–2000	
The Saturday Morning Block	1999–2000	
Cartoon Cartoon Summer	1999–2001	
The Cartoon Cartoon Show	2000–03; 2005–08	
The Big Pick	2000–01	
Cartoon Cartoon Weeknights	2000	
Cartoon Cartoon Primetime	2001	
The Premiere Premiere Show	2001–02	
Cartoon Cartoon Weekend Summerfest	2002	
Cartoon Cartoons: The Top 5	2002–08	
Cartoon Cartoons in the Morning	2002–03	
Cartoon Cartoons in the Afternoon	2002	

== List of series ==
=== Precursor ===
Title	Premiere date	Finale date(s)	Note(s)
What a Cartoon! / The What a Cartoon! Show / The Cartoon Cartoon Show	February 20, 1995	November 28, 1997 (as main show); November 29, 2002 (as collective series)	(Note: Renamed to The What a Cartoon! Show in 1996 and again to The Cartoon Cartoon Show in 2000.) (Note: This show is, or was, airing on Boomerang.)

=== Full series ===
Title	Premiere date	Finale date	Note(s)
Dexter's Laboratory	April 28, 1996	November 20, 2003	(Note: Reran as segments on The Cartoon Cartoon Show and Top 5, beginning in 2005.) (Note: Reran as segments on Cartoon Planet, beginning in 2012.)
Johnny Bravo	July 14, 1997	August 27, 2004	
Cow and Chicken	July 15, 1997	July 24, 1999	
I Am Weasel	July 15, 1997 (Note: As a standalone series on June 10, 1999.)	2000	
The Powerpuff Girls (original series)	November 18, 1998	March 25, 2005	
Ed, Edd n Eddy	January 4, 1999	November 8, 2009	
Mike, Lu & Og	November 12, 1999	May 27, 2001	
Courage the Cowardly Dog	November 12, 1999	November 22, 2002	
Sheep in the Big City	November 17, 2000	April 7, 2002	
Time Squad	June 8, 2001	November 26, 2003	
Grim & Evil	August 24, 2001	October 18, 2002	
Whatever Happened to... Robot Jones?	July 19, 2002	November 14, 2003	
Codename: Kids Next Door	December 6, 2002	January 21, 2008	
The Grim Adventures of Billy & Mandy+	June 13, 2003	November 9, 2007	
Evil Con Carne+	July 11, 2003	October 22, 2004	

- (+) Indicates that the show originally aired as part of Grim & Evil, and that the 2003-2004 episodes were not produced for the standalone show.

== In other media ==
DC Comics ran an anthology comic based on the Cartoon Cartoons; the series ran from March 2001 to October 2004 for a total of 33 issues.

In the OK K.O.! Let's Be Heroes episode "Crossover Nexus", the Cartoon Cartoon logo is shown in the bottom of a wall inside the Cartoon Network headquarters (as seen in the network's workplace-centric interstitials and the opening sequence of Fridays); the Cartoon Cartoon jingle theme song (originally written and composed by Stephen Mank of the now-defunct studio Primal Screen, based in Atlanta, Georgia) is played when Ben Tennyson (Ben 10) shape-shifts into different Cartoon Network characters.

Cartoon Cartoons was also reintroduced as a YouTube channel featuring content from older Cartoon Network shows since August 2024, it took place of the former YouTube channel for the now defunct Boomerang streaming service, that was shut down on September 30.

== See also ==
- List of programs broadcast by Cartoon Network
- Boomerang (TV network)
- Nicktoons - a brand for Nickelodeon animated series
- The Disney Afternoon - a syndication block of Disney Channel animated series
- 2 Stupid Dogs
