= Rotten apple =

Rotten apple may refer to:

- Apples that are no longer safe to eat
- Rotten Apples, a 2001 greatest hits compilation album by the Smashing Pumpkins
- Rotten Apple (album), by Lloyd Banks, or the title track, 2006
- "Rotten Apple", a song by Alice in Chains from the EP Jar of Flies, 1994
- The Rotten Apple, an alternative title for the 1963 film Five Minutes to Love
- "Rotten Apple" (Apple & Onion episode), 2020
- The nickname of Sharon Vineyard, a fictional character in Case Closed
