= The Fungies! =

Animated fantasy comedy TV series

- Genre: Fantasy; Adventure; Slice of life; Comedy
- Created by: Stephen P. Neary
- Story by: Rachel Hastings (S1); John McNamee; Stephen P. Neary; Kelsy Abbott
- Directed by: Derek Evanick; Diana Lafyatis; J. Falconer; Katie Aldworth
- Voices of: Harry Teitelman; Stephen P. Neary; Tama Brutsche; Jennifer Coolidge
- Theme music composer: Stephen P. Neary; Simon Panrucker
- Composers: Simon Panrucker; James L. Venable
- Country of origin: United States
- Original language: English
- No. of seasons: 3
- No. of episodes: 80

Production
- Executive producers: Stephen P. Neary; Jennifer Pelphrey (S1); Tramm Wigzell (S1); Brian A. Miller (S1); Rob Sorcher (S1); Sam Register (S2–3)
- Producer: Brent Tanner
- Editor: George Khair
- Running time: 11 minutes
- Production company: Cartoon Network Studios

Original release
- Network: HBO Max
- Release: August 20, 2020 – December 16, 2021

The Fungies! is an American animated comedy television series created by Stephen P. Neary and produced by Cartoon Network Studios for HBO Max.

The first season was first premiered on HBO Max in two parts, releasing in August 20, and October 8, 2020, respectively. The series made its linear premiere on Cartoon Network on June 4, 2021. The series had concluded after its third season, that same year on December 16. The series was removed from HBO Max in August 2022 among several other titles from the service as part of cost-cutting measures at parent company Warner Bros. Discovery. Series creator Stephen P. Neary criticized the service for its decision. The show was also removed from digital purchase in October 2023.

== Premise ==
The Fungies! is set in a prehistoric and mythological metropolis of Fungietown in a strange prehistoric world inhabited by some fungi-looking creatures and occasional dinosaurs. The series follows the adventures of Seth, one of the town's young mushroom inhabitants, whose love for scientific adventures often ends up with him stirring trouble with the local inhabitants and learning to understand others.

== Cast ==
- Harry Teitelman as Seth
- Zaela Rae as Claudette
- Justin Michael as Nevin
- Niki Yang as Lil' Lemon
- Grace Kaufman as Champsa, Holk
- Sam Richardson as Cool James, Mr. Mayor
- Stephen P. Neary as Pascal, Sir Tree
- Edi Patterson as Mertha, Anna Nanna
- Tama Brutsche as The Twins
- Jennifer Coolidge as Dr. Nancy
- Terry Gross as Pam
- Mary Faber as Teacher Terry
- June Squibb as Granny Grancie
- Chris Diamantopoulos as Commander Beefy
- Eric Edelstein as Coach Croach

== Episodes ==
=== Series overview ===
Season	Episodes		Originally released
Pilot			May 8, 2019
1	40	20	August 20, 2020
1	40	20	October 8, 2020
2	20		June 3, 2021
3	20		December 16, 2021

=== Pilot (2019) ===
Title	Directed by	Written and storyboarded by	Original release date	Prod. code
"The Fancies!"	Nick Cross (art), and Lindsey Pollard with Sheri Wheeler (animation)	Stephen P. Neary	May 8, 2019 (online)	100
A series of short segments detailing the adventures of young explorer mushroom Seth, and his friends. 1) "Fancytown": Seth documents the village of Fancytown and how it functions scientifically before playing bocce ball with his family. 2) "The Beach": Seth and his brother Pascal discover a beach after following a water trail. Activities ensue, including getting a sea creature to work up the courage to live on land. 3) "Run Pam Run": Seth tries to keep up with his dinosaur friend Pam, in a race. After a couple failed attempts at running and drifting, he trains to run faster. 4) "Sir Tree": When Seth's friend Sir Tree creates a pear, Commander Beefy (an alien space traveler/buisnessman) comes down and asks him to make more just like it, but Sir Tree can only create other kinds of fruit.

=== Season 1 (2020) ===
No. overall	No. in season	Title	Written and storyboarded by	Story by	Original release date	Cartoon Network air date	Prod. code	U.S. linear viewers (millions)
Part 1
1	1	"Let It Snowball"	Derek Evanick, Diana Lafyatis, Kevin Bailey, Hannah Ayoubi & Stephen P. Neary	Rachel Hastings, John McNamee & Stephen P. Neary	August 20, 2020	June 4, 2021	1080-004	0.20
Seth, Pascal and their friends discover Snow and play with it for a while. After Seth wants to get a coveted spot on his Mom's prized shelf of "stuff her kids gave her", he determines to bring snow to his house. Unfortunately, the snow keeps melting to the point of mud, but his mom keeps the mud price on the shelf. Suddenly, the Snow Mountain sends snow through the town.
2	2	"Sick Day"	Jaydeep Hasrajani & Kyle Neswald	Rachel Hastings, John McNamee & Stephen P. Neary	August 20, 2020	June 4, 2021	1080-002	0.17
Seth gets sick, but desperately wants to reach his "show and tell" presentation but gets "rivaled" by Claudette and her dog, Barkery. His mom brings Claudette and her dog, who tells him that they love his presentations. Coming to school excited the next day about a presentation about dogs, his classmates contract colds from Seth himself.
3	3	"Truffalo"	Stephen P. Neary	Rachel Hastings, John McNamee & Stephen P. Neary	August 20, 2020	June 11, 2021	1080-003	0.15
On the verge scientific discovery, Seth and the other Fungies are forced inside when the town is invaded by cow-like Truffalo.
4	4	"Green Eggs and Pam"	Jon Feria & Mark Galez	Rachel Hastings, John McNamee & Stephen P. Neary	August 20, 2020	June 11, 2021	1080-005	0.15
While exploding, Seth finds an egg and really wants to know what's inside it, but when Pam's egg-hatching instincts kick into gear, Seth will have to learn to trust her and nature.
5	5	"A Man and His Mustache"	Tom Law & Sonja von Marensdorff	Rachel Hastings, John McNamee & Stephen P. Neary	August 20, 2020	June 18, 2021	1080-006	0.13
When Seth borrows Pascal's mustache for a day at the beach, the Triloknights think he's an adult.
6	6	"Take Your Seth to Work Day"	Hannah Ayoubi & Kevin Bailey	Rachel Hastings, John McNamee & Stephen P. Neary	August 20, 2020	June 18, 2021	1080-007	0.14
Seth desire to help Nancy with her job at the hospital result in chaos when he, without Nancy's knowledge, plays doctor on sick Fungies. Seth has to admit his wrongdoing and listen to his mom in order to set things right.
7	7	"Voyage of the Rushroom"	Jon Feria & Mark Galez	Rachel Hastings, John McNamee & Stephen P. Neary	August 20, 2020	June 25, 2021	1080-008	0.10
Seth and Claudette are given a weekend project as punishment for disrupting class.
8	8	"The Twins Bug Seth"	Jaydeep Hasrajani & Kyle Neswald	Rachel Hastings, John McNamee & Stephen P. Neary	August 20, 2020	June 25, 2021	1080-010	0.12
Seth neglects his baby-sitting duties to do his own thing and winds up losing the twins to an army of ants.
9	9	"Ghosts Schmosts"	Tom Law & Sonja von Marensdorff	Rachel Hastings, John McNamee & Stephen P. Neary	August 20, 2020	July 2, 2021	1080-011	0.19
Seth leads a group of kids into a haunted mine in an effort to prove that everything has a scientific explanation and that there's no reason to be afraid ghosts.
10	10	"Hide and Pam / Chair Factory / Turtle / Rainy Day / Best Friends Club"	Stephen P. Neary	Rachel Hastings, John McNamee & Stephen P. Neary	August 20, 2020	July 2, 2021	1080-001	0.21
Hide and Pam: Pam learns to play hide and seek a little too well. Chair Factory: Seth improves productivity at the Fungietown chair factory. Turtle: Seth brings a shy turtle for show and tell. Rainy Day: Cool James teaches the other kids how to have fun making music on a rainy day. Best Friends Club: Lil' Lemon and Nelvin hold the first meeting of the Best Friends Club.
11	11	"Sir Tree's Body"	Hannah Ayoubi & Kevin Bailey	Kelsy Abbott, John McNamee & Stephen P. Neary	August 20, 2020	July 9, 2021	1080-012	0.19
12	12	"Commander Beefy"	Jon Feria & Mark Galez	Kelsy Abbott, John McNamee & Stephen P. Neary	August 20, 2020	July 9, 2021	1080-013	0.17
13	13	"The Fanciest Fungie"	Jaydeep Hasrajani, Kyle Neswald & Stephen P. Neary	Rachel Hastings, John McNamee & Stephen P. Neary	August 20, 2020	July 16, 2021	1080-009	0.11
14	14	"Snake It to the Limit"	Jaydeep Hasrajani & Kyle Neswald	Kelsy Abbott, John McNamee & Stephen P. Neary	August 20, 2020	July 16, 2021	1080-014	0.11
15	15	"Nevin's Cocoon"	Tom Law & Sonja von Marensdorff	Kelsy Abbott, John McNamee & Stephen P. Neary	August 20, 2020	July 23, 2021	1080-015	0.17
16	16	"Cool Kids"	Hannah Ayoubi & Kevin Bailey	Rachel Hastings, John McNamee & Stephen P. Neary	August 20, 2020	July 23, 2021	1080-016	0.14
17	17	"Mermove Out"	Jon Feria & Mark Galez	Kelsy Abbott, John McNamee & Stephen P. Neary	August 20, 2020	July 30, 2021	1080-017	0.14
18	18	"Happy Birthday Nancy"	Jaydeep Hasrajani & Kyle Neswald	Kelsy Abbott, John McNamee & Stephen P. Neary	August 20, 2020	July 30, 2021	1080-018	0.14
19	19	"New Pam in Town"	Tom Law & Sonja von Marensdorff	Kelsy Abbott, John McNamee & Stephen P. Neary	August 20, 2020	August 6, 2021	1080-019	0.17
20	20	"Class Garden"	Hannah Ayoubi & Kevin Bailey	Kelsy Abbott, John McNamee & Stephen P. Neary	August 20, 2020	August 6, 2021	1080-020	0.15
Part 2
21	21	"Free Squidly"	Jon Feria & Mark Galez	Kelsy Abbott, John McNamee & Stephen P. Neary	October 8, 2020	August 13, 2021	1089-021	0.21
22	22	"Fungie Scouts"	Kyle Neswald & Marceline Tanguay	Kelsy Abbott, John McNamee & Stephen P. Neary	October 8, 2020	August 13, 2021	1089-022	0.20
23	23	"The Granny Trap"	Tom Law & Sonja von Marensdorff	Kelsy Abbott, John McNamee & Stephen P. Neary	October 8, 2020	August 14, 2021	1089-023	0.16
24	24	"Nancy's Fireman Calendar"	Hannah Ayoubi & Kevin Bailey	Kelsy Abbott, John McNamee & Stephen P. Neary	October 8, 2020	August 14, 2021	1089-024	0.17
25	25	"The Well Monster"	Jon Feria & Mark Galez	Kelsy Abbott, John McNamee & Stephen P. Neary	October 8, 2020	August 20, 2021	1089-025	0.16
26	26	"Queen Seth"	Kyle Neswald & Marceline Tanguay	Kelsy Abbott, John McNamee & Stephen P. Neary	October 8, 2020	August 20, 2021	1089-026	0.16
27	27	"Sir Tree's Boy"	Tom Law & Sonja von Marensdorff	Kelsy Abbott, John McNamee & Stephen P. Neary	October 8, 2020	August 21, 2021	1089-027	0.10
28	28	"Mr. Pascal's Opus"	Hannah Ayoubi & Kevin Bailey	Kelsy Abbott, John McNamee & Stephen P. Neary	October 8, 2020	August 21, 2021	1089-028	N/A
29	29	"Lil' Lemon for President"	Jon Feria & Mark Galez	Kelsy Abbott, John McNamee & Stephen P. Neary	October 8, 2020	August 27, 2021	1089-029	0.12
30	30	"Long Legs"	Tom Law & Sonja von Marensdorff	Kelsy Abbott, John McNamee & Stephen P. Neary	October 8, 2020	August 27, 2021	1089-031	0.13
31	31	"Sir Tree House"	Tom Law & Sonja von Marensdorff	Kelsy Abbott, John McNamee & Stephen P. Neary	October 8, 2020	August 28, 2021	1089-035	0.19
32	32	"Lord Clawly Caper"	Hannah Ayoubi & Kevin Bailey	Kelsy Abbott, John McNamee & Stephen P. Neary	October 8, 2020	August 28, 2021	1089-032	0.20
33	33	"What About Cool James?"	Jon Feria & Mark Galez	Kelsy Abbott, John McNamee & Stephen P. Neary	October 8, 2020	September 3, 2021	1089-033	0.14
34	34	"Dino Club"	Kyle Neswald & Ben Lucas	Kelsy Abbott, John McNamee & Stephen P. Neary	October 8, 2020	September 3, 2021	1089-030	0.12
35	35	"Commander Lazer"	Kyle Neswald & Ben Lucas	Kelsy Abbott, John McNamee & Stephen P. Neary	October 8, 2020	TBA	1089-034	N/A
36	36	"Fungopolis"	Jon Feria & Mark Galez	Kelsy Abbott, John McNamee & Stephen P. Neary	October 8, 2020	TBA	1089-037	N/A
37	37	"Pam Runs Forever"	Hannah Ayoubi & Kevin Bailey	Kelsy Abbott, John McNamee & Stephen P. Neary	October 8, 2020	TBA	1089-036	N/A
38	38	"RFUN Radio"	Kyle Neswald & Ben Lucas	Kelsy Abbott, John McNamee & Stephen P. Neary	October 8, 2020	TBA	1089-038	N/A
39	39	"Where's Coach?"	Tom Law & Sonja von Marensdorff	Kelsy Abbott, John McNamee & Stephen P. Neary	October 8, 2020	TBA	1089-039	N/A
40	40	"One Night at Nevin's"	Hannah Ayoubi & Kevin Bailey	Kelsy Abbott, John McNamee & Stephen P. Neary	October 8, 2020	TBA	1089-040	N/A

=== Season 2 (2021) ===
No. overall	No. in season	Title	Written and storyboarded by	Story by	Original release date	Prod. code
41	1	"Bird War"	Geneva Hodgson & Jon Feria	Kelsy Abbott, John McNamee & Stephen P. Neary	June 3, 2021	1093-048
42	2	"Bug Buds"	Kyle Neswald & Ben Lucas	Kelsy Abbott, John McNamee & Stephen P. Neary	June 3, 2021	1093-041
43	3	"Beefo the Kid"	Tom Law & Sonja von Marensdorff	Kelsy Abbott, John McNamee & Stephen P. Neary	June 3, 2021	1093-042
44	4	"Where the Truffalo Roam"	Kevin Bailey, Geneva Hodgson & Taylor Carilli	Kelsy Abbott, John McNamee & Stephen P. Neary	June 3, 2021	1093-043
45	5	"Seth the Frog"	Kyle Neswald & Ben Lucas	Kelsy Abbott, John McNamee & Stephen P. Neary	June 3, 2021	1093-045
46	6	"Home, Run!"	Tom Law & Sonja von Marensdorff	Kelsy Abbott, John McNamee & Stephen P. Neary	June 3, 2021	1093-046
47	7	"The Scoop"	Kevin Bailey & Taylor Carilli	Kelsy Abbott, John McNamee & Stephen P. Neary	June 3, 2021	1093-047
48	8	"Flawless"	Tom Law & Sonja von Marensdorff	Kelsy Abbott, John McNamee & Stephen P. Neary	June 3, 2021	1093-050
49	9	"Smarty Flower"	Kyle Neswald & Ben Lucas	Kelsy Abbott, John McNamee & Stephen P. Neary	June 3, 2021	1093-049
50	10	"Campfire Creepies"	Kevin Bailey & Taylor Carilli	Kelsy Abbott, John McNamee & Stephen P. Neary	June 3, 2021	1093-051
51	11	"I Hear You"	Aleks Sennwald & Jon Feria	Kelsy Abbott, John McNamee & Stephen P. Neary	June 3, 2021	1093-052
52	12	"Twinseparable"	Geneva Hodgson & Ben Lucas	Kelsy Abbott, John McNamee & Stephen P. Neary	June 3, 2021	1093-053
53	13	"For Keeps"	Sonja von Marensdorff & Jon Feria	Kelsy Abbott, John McNamee & Stephen P. Neary	June 3, 2021	1093-054
54	14	"Tina Turnip"	Kevin Baliey & Taylor Carilli	Kelsy Abbott, John McNamee & Stephen P. Neary	June 3, 2021	1093-055
55	15	"The Mayor's Apprentice"	Derek Evanick & Diana Lafyatis	Kelsy Abbott, John McNamee & Stephen P. Neary	June 3, 2021	1093-056
56	16	"Gorbo Gets Flushed"	Kevin Baliey & Taylor Carilli	Kelsy Abbott, John McNamee & Stephen P. Neary	June 3, 2021	1093-059
57	17	"Rattlesnake Jane"	Geneva Hodgson & Ben Lucas	Kelsy Abbott, John McNamee & Stephen P. Neary	June 3, 2021	1093-057
58	18	"Special Bloom"	Sonja von Marensdorff & Jon Feria	Kelsy Abbott, John McNamee & Stephen P. Neary	June 3, 2021	1093-058
59	19	"Meteor Madness"	Derek Evanick & Diana Lafyatis	Kelsy Abbott, John McNamee & Stephen P. Neary	June 3, 2021	1093-060
60	20	"Camping with the Family"	Sonja von Marensdorff & Jon Feria	Kelsy Abbott, John McNamee & Stephen P. Neary	June 3, 2021	1093-062

=== Season 3 (2021) ===
No. overall	No. in season	Title	Written and storyboarded by	Story by	Original release date	Prod. code
61	1	"Hugbear Hullabaloo"	Geneva Hodgson, Fran Krause & Ben Lucas	Kelsy Abbott, John McNamee & Stephen P. Neary	December 16, 2021	1093-061
62	2	"Shania's Place"	Kevin Bailey & Taylor Carilli	Kelsy Abbott, John McNamee & Stephen P. Neary	December 16, 2021	1093-063
63	3	"Pam's Big Break"	Derek Evanick & Diana Lafyatis	Kelsy Abbott, John McNamee & Stephen P. Neary	December 16, 2021	1093-064
64	4	"You've Got Whale"	Geneva Hodgson & Ben Lucas	Kelsy Abbott, John McNamee & Stephen P. Neary	December 16, 2021	1093-065
65	5	"Beefy Cruise"	Sonja von Marensdorff & Jon Feria	Kelsy Abbott, John McNamee & Stephen P. Neary	December 16, 2021	1093-066
66	6	"Billy Fungie"	Derek Evanick & Diana Lafyatis	Kelsy Abbott, John McNamee & Stephen P. Neary	December 16, 2021	1093-068
67	7	"Pascal's Big Fan"	Kevin Bailey & Taylor Carilli	Kelsy Abbott, John McNamee & Stephen P. Neary	December 16, 2021	1093-067
68	8	"Sir Tree's Sick"	Fran Krause & Ben Lucas	Kelsy Abbott, John McNamee & Stephen P. Neary	December 16, 2021	1093-069
69	9	"Virtual Boys"	Sonja von Marensdorff & Jon Feria	Kelsy Abbott, John McNamee & Stephen P. Neary	December 16, 2021	1093-070
70	10	"Too Many Grandpas"	Kevin Bailey & Taylor Carilli	Kelsy Abbott, John McNamee & Stephen P. Neary	December 16, 2021	1093-071
71	11	"Messy Locker"	Derek Evanick & Diana Lafyatis	Kelsy Abbott, John McNamee & Stephen P. Neary	December 16, 2021	1093-072
72	12	"The Edge"	Sonja von Marensdorff & Jon Feria	Kelsy Abbott, John McNamee & Stephen P. Neary	December 16, 2021	1093-074
73	13	"Simple Beefy"	Kevin Bailey & Taylor Carilli	Kelsy Abbott, John McNamee & Stephen P. Neary	December 16, 2021	1093-075
74	14	"Nancy and the Rodeo"	Tyrell Soloman, Sonja von Marensdorff & Ben Lucas	Kelsy Abbott, John McNamee & Stephen P. Neary	December 16, 2021	1093-073
75	15	"Teacher Terry's Day Off"	Derek Evanick & Diana Lafyatis	Kelsy Abbott, John McNamee & Stephen P. Neary	December 16, 2021	1093-076
76	16	"The Lord & the Layabout"	Derek Evanick & Diana Lafyatis	Kelsy Abbott, John McNamee & Stephen P. Neary	December 16, 2021	1093-080
77	17	"Mifflin's Replacement"	Kevin Bailey & Taylor Carilli	Kelsy Abbott, John McNamee & Stephen P. Neary	December 16, 2021	1093-079
78	18	"Mission Shania"	Sonja von Marensdorff & Jon Feria	Kelsy Abbott, John McNamee & Stephen P. Neary	December 16, 2021	1093-078
79	19	"Miner's Market"	Tyrell Soloman, Diana Lafyatis, Derek Evanick, Stephen P. Neary & Sonja von Marensdorff	Kelsy Abbott, John McNamee & Stephen P. Neary	December 16, 2021	1093-077
80	20	"Lost Fungies!"	Stephen P. Neary	Kelsy Abbott, John McNamee & Stephen P. Neary	December 16, 2021	1093-044

== Production ==
The show was originally developed and based on a 2017 pilot called The Fancies, as part of the Cartoon Network International Artists Program, and was greenlight for a series in July, 2019.

On July 24, 2020, the show was announced on August 20, 2020, to be released on HBO Max.

== Release and broadcast ==
The Fungies! first season and its first part premiered on August 20, 2020, on HBO Max, followed by the second part of the season on October 8, 2020. The series made its linear premiere at United States in Cartoon Network on June 4, 2021, following its release in Southeast Asia on November 14, of a prior year. The series had concluded after its third season, which was released on December 16, 2021. The series was removed from HBO Max in August 18, 2022. Series creator Stephen P. Neary criticized the service for its decision. Later in October 2023, the series was also removed from digital purchase.

== Reception ==
The show received mixed reviews from critics. Common Sense Media rated the show at 4/5 stars, stating that "The silliness will draw kids in, but parents will appreciate all the great stuff secretly woven through each episode." Mashable also gave a favorable review, writing that it had "perfect balance between the soft, safe world of children's programming and the deadpan absurdism of emotional exhaustion — y'know, but with mushrooms. And dinosaurs. And, oh yeah, that talking stump." Scoops Animation Corner gave a score of 5/10 and wrote that the show "doesn't have that kind of adult-tinged humor I was hoping for, the show is a great experiment in animation."
