= Steve Manale =

Canadian comic artist and illustrator

Steve Manale is a Canadian comic artist and illustrator. He is occasionally credited as Steven Charles Manale. He created the web comic Superslackers and contributed artwork to the comic book series Scott Pilgrim. He curated an exhibition in Toronto honoring professional basketball player Ron Artest.

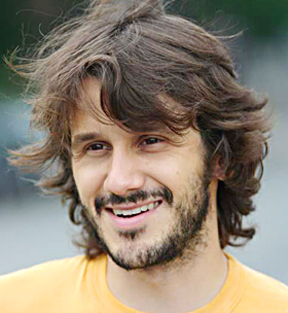
Steve Manale

== Illustration ==
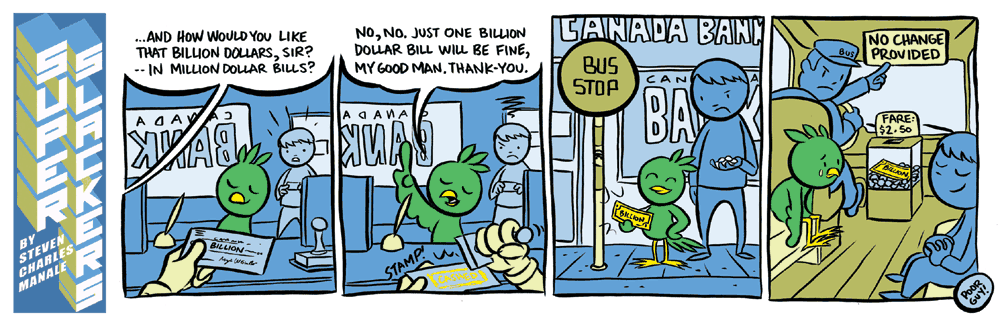
A sample strip from Superslackers

Manale is the creator of the web comic Superslackers. The comic is described by Manale as "mostly about a group of kids who tease and torment each other all in the name of fun. They're content hanging out at the park and eating popsicles. Actually doing anything super requires way too much effort on their part... Superslackers is an All-ages, Western, Pirate, Screwball, Bible, Roman, Superhero, Coming-Of-Age, Feel-good, Comedy diversion." In 2005, Superslackers was nominated for an Ignatz Award in the category of Outstanding Online Comic. Superslackers was also published in the Toronto Star's youth-oriented offshoot newspaper, Brand New Planet, from 2003 until 2006. The comic also received a favourable review from Scott McCloud, the American comic theorist and writer of Understanding Comics. Alexander Danner and Iain Hamp, both fellow comic artists, similarly gave positive reviews of Superslackers.

In 2007, Manale contributed guest art to the acclaimed comic book series, Scott Pilgrim. The artwork, using characters created by Scott Pilgrim author Bryan Lee O'Malley, was published in volume four of the series, Scott Pilgrim Gets it Together. Manale also makes an uncredited appearance in Scott Pilgrim vs. The World, the 2010 film adaptation of the comic directed by Edgar Wright. During the DVD commentary of the film, Bryan Lee O'Malley can be heard making reference to Manale's appearance.

Manale also collaborated with writer Marcel St. Pierre on the comic "Sponge and Stone," which appeared quarter-annually in YTV Whoa Magazine from 2000 until 2009. Other clients of Manale's have included Nickelodeon, textbook publishers Thomson Nelson, Cheestrings, Hellmann's Mayonnaise and the Toronto Raptors. Currently, Manale writes and illustrates the comic "Chick and Dee" for the Canadian children's publication, ChickaDEE Magazine. He also contributes regularly to the publication Taddle Creek and collaborates on limited-edition prints with indie publisher, Koyama Press.

He was a storyboard artist for Summer Camp Island and co-created the short Foools for the Cartoon Cartoons shorts program alongside Seo Kim.

== Writing ==
In 2003, Manale collaborated with artist Darwyn Cooke and DC editor Mark Chiarello (cited as a colourist) on a back-up feature in JSA: All Stars #3 (DC Comics). The story, written by Manale, is based around the character Dr. Fate. In 2009, Manale collaborated with the artist duo Kozyndan on their art book, The Unknown Portraits. The book featured short stories inspired by individual drawings.

== Curation ==
=== Lovable Badass ===
In December 2010, Manale curated the exhibition Lovable Badass at Narwhal Art Projects in Toronto, Ontario. In celebration of the career and personal life of NBA basketball player Ron Artest, Manale commissioned work from 30 artists inspired by the athlete. The exhibition received attention from several media sources, including FoxSports, ESPN, the National Post and Ron Artest himself. In a video profile of the exhibition by The Basketball Jones, Artest is captured attending the exhibition opening. Manale was also interviewed on ESPN's First Take about the exhibition.
