= Marlo Meekins =

American cartoonist (born 1981)

Lisa O'Hare
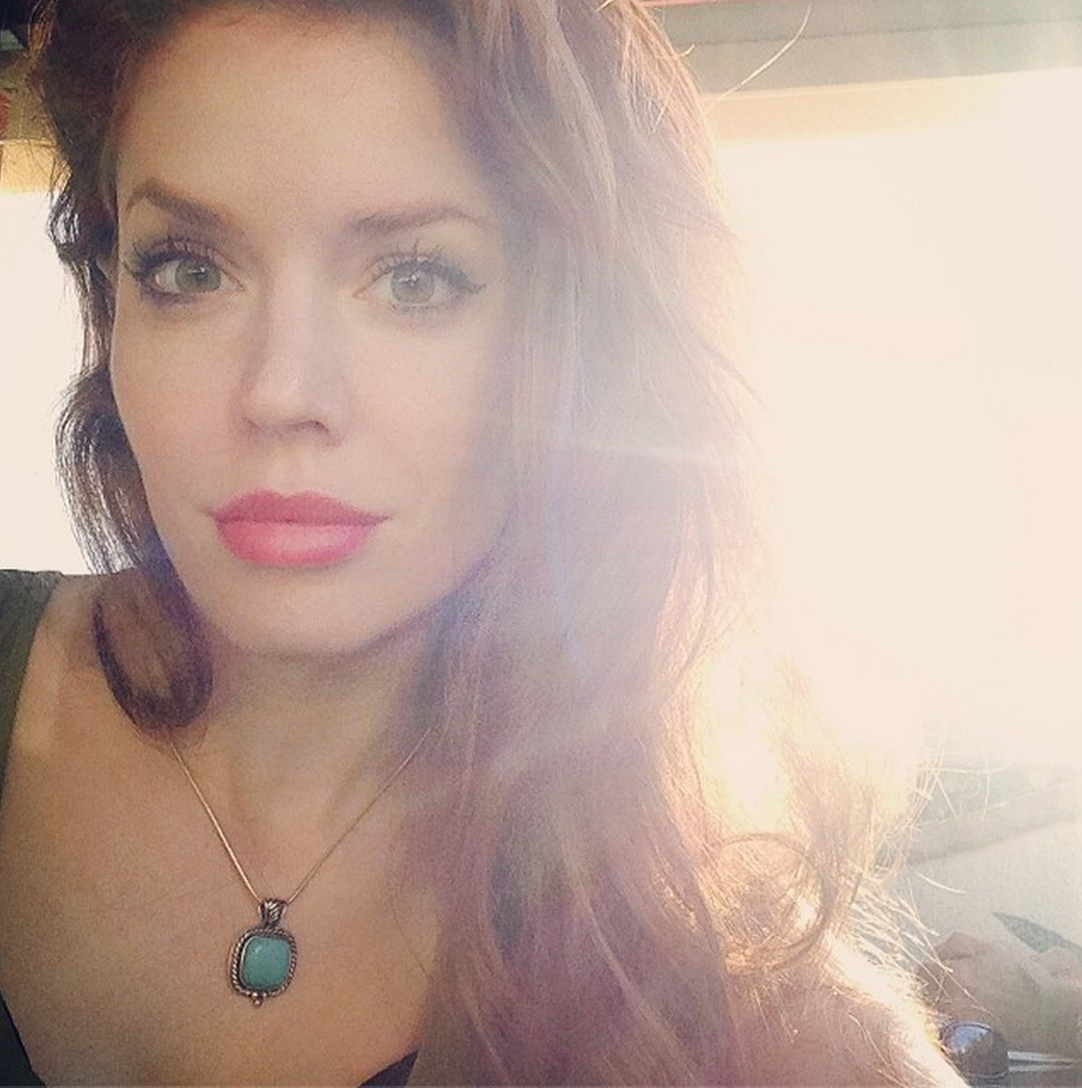
- Born: April 24, 1981 (age 45); Collingswood, New Jersey
- Occupations: Cartoonist, comedian, caricaturist, model, actress
- Spouse: Nick Cross

Marlo Meekins (born April 24, 1981) is an American cartoonist, comedian, caricaturist, model and actress. She is best known for her work on Vine.

== Biography ==
Meekins was born in Collingswood, New Jersey. In 2003, she earned a bachelor's degree in Illustration from Moore College of Art and Design. She also attended the Rhode Island School of Design.

Meekins' work came to notice when she started a blog in 2005 and was featured in Zoo Weekly Australia and Attack of the Show!, who praised her "Ren & Stimpy-style illustrations." She won the Silver Nosey Award for Caricaturist of the Year at the 2009 International Society of Caricature Artists convention.

Meekins' Vine videos often featured crude humor and satire and make use of animation, costumes, props, fake blood, special effects, and her dogs. They earned her a place on Comedy Central's first online comedy festival in 2013, where The New York Times praised her "crisp ideas and unexpected visual flourishes". Later that year, Meekins was commissioned by Wendy's to make and share a Vine in her typical style.

She is married to Over the Garden Wall art director and double Emmy winner, Nick Cross.
