= Brand New Planet =

Magazine

Brand New Planet, also known as BNP, was a youth magazine affiliated with the Toronto Star. It was published between 2003 and 2007.

== History and profile ==
Brand New Planet was founded in 2003. Once distributed in hard copy, via the Thursday edition of the Star, it was later published solely as an online paper. Subscriptions were offered free of charge at its Toronto Star-hosted website. The paper was delivered to subscribers through an email notification on Thursdays in PDF. It was directed at children between the ages of 9–14. Brand New Planet shut down permanently in June 2007 due to lack of advertising.

Between 2003 and 2007, Brand New Planet printed the comic Superslackers by artist Steve Manale. The comic was nominated for an Ignatz Award in 2005 in the category of Best Online Comic.
