= List of Apple & Onion episodes =

The following is a list of episodes from the series Apple & Onion.

== Series overview ==
Season	Episodes	Originally released	
Season	Episodes	First released	Last released
Pilot		May 14, 2016	
Shorts	8	February 11, 2018	April 7, 2018
1	40	February 23, 2018	July 20, 2020
2	36	July 21, 2020	December 7, 2021

== Episodes ==
=== Pilot (2016) ===
Title	Written by	Storyboarded by	Original release date	Original release date	Prod. code	U.S. viewers (millions)
"Apple & Onion"	George Gendi, Michael; Gendi, and Matt Layzell	George Gendi and Matt Layzell	June 18, 2015 (Annecy Festival); May 2, 2016 (Online)	May 14, 2016	001	0.82
Apple and Onion accidentally get invited to Hot Dog's party. The duo are excited, specifically Onion as he wants to get close with French Fry, but when Burger tries to dissuade them by saying it is a "more grown-up party", they decide that they need to grow up which somehow lands them in jail.

=== Season 1 (2018–20) ===
No. overall	No. in season	Title	Written and storyboarded by	Story by	Original release date	Prod. code	U.S. viewers (millions)
1	1	"A New Life"	Benton Connor and Nick Edwards	George Gendi, Kelsy Abbott, Joe Saunders, Mike Benner, and Michael Gendi	February 23, 2018	107	0.71
Apple and Onion are separately sent off to a new life in the city by their respective parents. Apple is to find an apartment that is ready for him through a map, while Onion has free housing waiting through his job at Fun Co. Upon making it to the city, the two find that what can go wrong will go wrong (just like Murphy's law), and eventually find their journeys intertwined. Songs: "Take It One Step at a Time" & "I Will Make Friends"
2	2	"The Perfect Team"	George Gendi and Benton Connor	George Gendi, Mike Roth, Benton Connor, Matt Layzell, Matt Price, and Michael Gendi	February 23, 2018	101	0.71
During a computer game-playing session, "perfect team" Apple and Onion find themselves with a new roommate pawing at their window: a cat. It loves to roost upon Apple's head, but seems to hate Onion because of his hair; causing tension between who spends more time with Apple. Songs: "Level 99" & "Wake Up Song"
3	3	"Tips"	Jonny Van Orman and Phylicia Fuentes	George Gendi, Kelsy Abott, Joe Saunders, Mike Benner, and Michael Gendi	March 2, 2018	106	0.88
Apple and Onion desire to be on a balloon ride, they gather all the change they can but it's not enough. Desperate to get on the ride, they work to get tips from customers at the pizza place where Pizza works, they start to scare off customers, but then realize they need to do this by being polite to the customers. Songs: "What Shall We Do Today" & "Have Some Tips Song"
4	4	"Falafel's Fun Day"	Benton Connor	George Gendi, Michael Gendi, Kelsy Abbott, Joe Saunders, Matt Layzell, Benton Connor, Mike Roth, and Nick Edwards	March 2, 2018	102	0.82
Apple and Onion decide to show their landlord Falafel an amazing day when he starts to feel homesick and after getting him mad when they didn't listen to his warnings about the air conditioner, things don't go the way they intended, however. Songs: "He Fix It" & "Apple and Onion and Me"
5	5	"Apple's in Trouble"	Riley Riggen and Arlyne Ramirez	George Gendi, Joe Saunders, and Michael Gendi	March 9, 2018	104	0.73
Apple is challenged to a fight by a grumpy Cheesesteak after scolding Lemondrop for ruining the duo's work, so he and Onion go on a quest to find the source of Cheesesteak's grumpiness by using the clues for a “chain reaction”. This quest starts from the hotel, then into a room, then into a kitchen, then into the sewers, then into another room, then into Edwards School. Song: "Classic Domino Chain Reversal Song"
6	6	"4 on 1"	Nick Edwards and Jason Dwyer	George Gendi, Mike Roth, Benton Connor, Matt Layzell, Matt Price, and Michael Gendi	March 9, 2018	103	0.73
When Burger and Hot Dog notice Onion has some pro basketball skills, they decide to ask if he and Apple would be interested to join their team for the big 4 on 4 tournaments, they accept, but Onion starts to lose for the team when he finds the voices in his head keep throwing him off and making him nervous. Song: "Onion's Talent Song"
7	7	"Hot Dog's Movie Premiere"	Riley Riggen and Arlyne Ramirez	George Gendi, Kelsy Abbott, Joe Saunders, Dick Grunert, and Michael Gendi	March 16, 2018	105	0.77
Apple and Onion are banned from the premiere of their friend Hot Dog's new movie he's in: Robotot II, so they try many attempts to sneak in. Their plans involve hiding in Popcorn to get in the bathroom so they can get into the booth, using objects to fool Chicken Nugget (a police-guard), disguising themselves as dogs, and using dipping sauce. Songs: "Sorry, Chicken Nugget" & "How's Anyone Gonna Respect Me?"
8	8	"Bottle Catch"	Alex Cline and Sean Glaze	George Gendi, Kelsy Abbott, Joe Saunders, and Michael Gendi	March 16, 2018	108	0.77
Apple and Onion invent a new game called bottle catch (tossing a water bottle back and forth). When Energy Bar hears about it, she steals the idea. In order to get everyone to buy the many water bottles they need to sell, they try to interest them in the bottles by having a bottle catch contest against Energy Bar and Whey. Songs: "Bottle Catch Song" & "Rhythm of the Cat"
9	9	"Pancake’s Bus Tour"	David Ochs	George Gendi, Kelsy Abbott, Joe Saunders, and Michael Gendi	March 23, 2018	109	0.79
When Apple loses his shoe, Onion takes him on a guided bus tour to a shooting star show to have him wish for his shoe. But on the bus, Apple must learn to try and stay serious so they won't get kicked off the bus. Songs: "Where's Apple's Shoe?" & "Hopping Along"
10	10	"Block Party"	David Ochs and Nick Arciaga	George Gendi, Kelsy Abbott, Joe Saunders, and Michael Gendi	March 23, 2018	110	0.79
Apple and Onion are getting ready for a block party with all their friends, but a mischievous duck takes over their roof. When they are unable to get into the house because they're stuck with the duck, they try to outwit it before the cake they baked for the party melts and destroys their laptop, which holds the song they wrote for the party. Song: "We're Having a Block Party"
11	11	"Apple's Focus"	Written by : Michael Gendi; Storyboarded by : Calvin Wong and Gideon Chase	Eric Acosta, George Gendi, Michael Gendi, Andres Salaff, Deepak Sethi, Sean Szeles, and Calvin Wong	November 2, 2019	111	0.55
Apple tries to help Onion achieve his life long dream of being on a cook show as he is a skilled home chef, he is however scared that Apple will ruin his opportunity. Apple then ruins his opportunity and they lose the recipe but it's found out that Apple had made a song containing all the ingredients of the cake that Onion was planning to make. Songs: "Recipe"
12	12	"Lil' Noodle"	Written by : Deepak Sethi; Storyboarded by : Gideon Chase and Calvin Wong	Eric Acosta, George Gendi, Michael Gendi, Deepak Sethi, and Sean Szeles	November 2, 2019	115	0.63
Apple and Onion walk down the side walk in a "wicked style", a famous rapper notices their slick moves and decides to have them be background characters in an upcoming music video. These hopes for the duo are later complicated as a bird decides to nest in Onion's hair. Songs: "Wicked Style"
13	13	"Gyranoid of the Future"	Written by : Eric Acosta; Storyboarded by : Brendan Regulinski and Aimee Steinberger	Eric Acosta, George Gendi, Michael Gendi, Deepak Sethi, and Sean Szeles	November 2, 2019	117	0.53
The duo try to ride a new thrill ride at the amusement park, but the curator of an old ride keeps interfering. Songs: "Carnival Song"
14	14	"Fun Proof"	Written by : Deepak Sethi; Storyboarded by : Brendan Regulinski and Aimee Steinberger	Eric Acosta, George Gendi, Michael Gendi, Deepak Sethi, and Sean Szeles	November 2, 2019	113	0.51
The duo compete to get their picture on the diner wall as the "most fun people".
15	15	"Whale Spotting"	Written by : Deepak Sethi; Storyboarded by : Maha Tabikh and Natasha L. Barredo	Eric Acosta, George Gendi, Michael Gendi, Deepak Sethi, and Sean Szeles	November 9, 2019	118	0.53
In order to see a rare whale, Onion hides his seasickness to join a snobbish group of boaters.
16	16	"Heatwave"	Written by : Michael Gendi; Storyboarded by : Bryan Mann and Bea Ritter	Eric Acosta, George Gendi, Michael Gendi, Deepak Sethi, and Sean Szeles	November 9, 2019	116	0.52
The duo try to cheer up the residents of a retirement home during a heat wave. Songs: "It's Very Very Hot"
17	17	"Apple's in Charge"	Written by : Michael Gendi; Storyboarded by : Calvin Wong and Sam Spina	Eric Acosta, George Gendi, Michael Gendi, Deepak Sethi, and Sean Szeles	November 9, 2019	119	0.47
For once, Apple is put in charge of the dollar store. But his ideas to make money keep failing. Songs: "Dollar"
18	18	"Burger's Trampoline"	Written by : Eric Acosta; Storyboarded by : Bryan Mann and Bea Ritter	Eric Acosta, George Gendi, Michael Gendi, Andres Salaff, Deepak Sethi, Sean Szeles, and Calvin Wong	November 9, 2019	112	0.52
The duo pretend to like Burger's boring card game show so that they can use his trampoline. Songs: "Our Friends" and "Burger's Trampoline"
19	19	"Baby Boi TP"	Written by : Deepak Sethi; Storyboarded by : Brendan Regulinski and Aimee Steinberger	Eric Acosta, George Gendi, Michael Gendi, Deepak Sethi, and Sean Szeles	November 16, 2019	121	0.36
Apple dreams of constructing a complex sculpture out of toilet paper, but needs a lifetime supply to finish it. Songs: "Onion Anyway"
20	20	"Not Funny"	Written by : Michael Gendi; Storyboarded by : Maha Tabikh and Natasha L. Barredo	Eric Acosta, George Gendi, Michael Gendi, Deepak Sethi, and Sean Szeles	November 16, 2019	122	0.34
Apple becomes very jealous of Cotton Candy when she and Onion hit it off as friends. Songs: "Cotton Candy and Onion" and "Apple and Apple"
21	21	"Onionless"	Written by : Eric Acosta; Storyboarded by : Bryan Mann and Bea Ritter	Eric Acosta, George Gendi, Michael Gendi, Deepak Sethi, and Sean Szeles	November 23, 2019	120	0.49
When Onion is absent, Apple must take care of his plant. But a TV show distracts him. Songs: "Clean Apple's Sock"
22	22	"Party Popper"	Written by : Eric Acosta; Storyboarded by : Maha Tabikh and Natasha L. Barredo	Eric Acosta, George Gendi, Michael Gendi, Deepak Sethi, and Sean Szeles	November 23, 2019	114	0.47
A grumpy (and bossy) guest joins a party in Apple and Onion's shack. The duo try to prevent his most disliked factor, singing, from happening. Songs: "Anyways Smile"
23	23	"Face Your Fears"	Written by : Michael Gendi; Storyboarded by : Brendan Regulinski and Aimee Steinberger	Eric Acosta, George Gendi, Michael Gendi, Deepak Sethi, and Sean Szeles	November 30, 2019	125	0.36
The duo promise to be by French Fry's side so that she can face her fears and recite her poetry. But then they end up locked in a pet store.
24	24	"Apple's Short"	Written by : Eric Acosta; Storyboarded by : Bryan Mann and Bea Ritter	Eric Acosta, George Gendi, Michael Gendi, Deepak Sethi, and Sean Szeles	November 30, 2019	124	0.35
Apple becomes convinced that a movie star is his true love. But then he realizes to her dislike that he's short. Songs: "Onion's Happiness"
25	25	"Positive Attitude Theory"	Written by : Deepak Sethi; Storyboarded by : Calvin Wong and Sam Spina	Eric Acosta, George Gendi, Michael Gendi, Deepak Sethi, and Sean Szeles	December 7, 2019	123	0.30
The duo bet Falafel that they can handle his job for a day with their positive attitude. Songs: "Apple's Songs"
26	26	"Follow Your Dreams"	Written by : Eric Acosta; Storyboarded by : Maha Tabikh and Natasha L. Barredo	Eric Acosta, George Gendi, Michael Gendi, Deepak Sethi, and Sean Szeles	December 7, 2019	126	0.25
The duo get duped by a commercial into believing that their dream is to be professional pet groomers. Songs: "Take it One Step at the Time"
27	27	"Sausage and Sweetie Smash"	Written by : Deepak Sethi; Storyboarded by : Calvin Wong and Sam Spina	Eric Acosta, George Gendi, Michael Gendi, Deepak Sethi, and Sean Szeles	January 11, 2020	127	0.37
When Apple and Onion go to the grocery story to get some food, they get distracted by their obsessions: Apple's obsession of sausages and Onion's obsession of a video game called Sweetie Smash. In order to get their grocery shopping done, Apple and Onion must conquer their obsessions. Songs: "Shopping List Song" and "Waiting for Onion"
28	28	"Selfish Shellfish"	Written by : Eric Acosta and Michael Gendi; Storyboarded by : Bryan Mann and Bea Ritter	Eric Acosta, George Gendi, Michael Gendi, Deepak Sethi, and Sean Szeles	January 18, 2020	128	0.45
The duo try to prove Shellfish wrong when she claims that they do good deeds just to selfishly gain praise. Songs: "Good Deeds" and "Selfish"
29	29	"Apple's Formula"	Written by : Deepak Sethi; Storyboarded by : Brendan Regulinski and Aimee Steinberger	Eric Acosta, George Gendi, Michael Gendi, Deepak Sethi, Sean Szeles, David Ochs, and John Mathot	January 25, 2020	129	0.45
Tater Tot wants to put Apple in his new movie because he thinks Apple is "naturally funny". This sends Apple on a quest to determine the formula that makes him funny. Songs: "What We Are"
30	30	"River of Gold"	Written by : Michael Gendi; Storyboarded by : Calvin Wong, Sam Spina, and Kristen Woo	Eric Acosta, George Gendi, Michael Gendi, Deepak Sethi, and Sean Szeles	February 1, 2020	131	0.47
The duo become obsessed with reading an old book on display at the museum. But Chicken Nugget has to guard the book in order to get his police job back.
31	31	"Appleoni"	Written by : Eric Acosta; Storyboarded by : Maha Tabikh and Natasha L. Barredo	Eric Acosta, George Gendi, Michael Gendi, and Deepak Sethi	February 8, 2020	130	0.36
The duo make up a new dance, but Burger steals the credit when he gains fame doing the dance with one modification. Songs: "Dancing at the Dollar Store"
32	32	"Falafel's in Jail"	Written by : Eric Acosta; Storyboarded by : Bryan Mann and Bea Ritter	Eric Acosta, George Gendi, Michael Gendi, and Deepak Sethi	February 22, 2020	132	0.36
Falafel is arrested for seemingly making a string of headset robberies. Apple and Onion feel so convinced of his innocence that they make repeated attempts to break him out of jail. Songs: "I Am a Man in Jail (أنا رجل في السجن)"
33	33	"The Music Store Thief"	Written by : Eric Acosta; Storyboarded by : Brendan Regulinski and Aimee Steinberger	Eric Acosta, George Gendi, Michael Gendi, and Deepak Sethi	February 29, 2020	133	0.39
Someone is stealing instruments from Ice Tea's music store, right under the nose of Chicken Nugget, who moonlights there as a security guard. Apple and Onion love the store so much that they volunteer to help catch the thief. Songs: "We Love This Store" and "Chicken Nugget's Birthday Song"
34	34	"The Fly"	Written by : Deepak Sethi; Storyboarded by : Maha Tabikh and Natasha L. Barredo	Eric Acosta, George Gendi, Michael Gendi, and Deepak Sethi	March 7, 2020	134	0.43
Apple and Onion must get a fly out of their apartment or Falafel will kick them out. Songs: "Shoo, Fly"
35	35	"Dragonhead"	Written by : Deepak Sethi; Storyboarded by : Calvin Wong, Sam Spina, and Kristen Woo	Eric Acosta, George Gendi, Michael Gendi, and Deepak Sethi	March 14, 2020	135	0.43
Apple and Onion start a secret city parking lot to raise money for a new shower head. Songs: "Parking Song"
36	36	"Pulling Your Weight"	Written by : Eric Acosta; Storyboarded by : Bryan Mann and Bea Ritter	Eric Acosta, George Gendi, Michael Gendi, Deepak Sethi, and Sean Szeles	March 21, 2020	136	0.27
Apple and Onion start taking workout lessons at the city gym in order to get strong enough to save each other’s life.
37	37	"Rotten Apple"	Written by : Deepak Sethi; Storyboarded by : Brendan Regulinski and Aimee Steinberger	Eric Acosta, George Gendi, Michael Gendi, and Deepak Sethi	March 28, 2020	137	0.36
Onion’s dad comes to the city to visit but thinks Apple is a bad influence on Onion.
38	38	"The Inbetween"	Written by : Michael Gendi; Storyboarded by : Sam Spina and Kristen Woo	Eric Acosta, George Gendi, Michael Gendi, Deepak Sethi, and Sean Szeles	April 4, 2020	138	0.36
Apple and Onion get lost in the space between their apartment and Falafel's, where they encounter a long lost tenant.
39	39	"Election Day"	Written by : Michael Gendi; Storyboarded by : Bryan Mann and Bea Ritter	Eric Acosta, George Gendi, Michael Gendi, Deepak Sethi, and Sean Szeles	April 11, 2020	139	0.35
Apple wants to be the mayor after Mayor Naise bans street parties so he can have some peace and quiet.
40	40	"Champion"	Written by : Deepak Sethi; Storyboarded by : Brendan Regulinski and Aimee Steinberger	Eric Acosta, George Gendi, Michael Gendi, Deepak Sethi, and Sean Szeles	July 20, 2020 (Note: This episode was first released on the Cartoon Network App on July 17, 2020.)	140	0.18
Apple and Onion need to get rid of a problematic dog they thought was a horse.

=== Season 2 (2020–21) ===
No. overall	No. in season	Title	Written and storyboarded by	Story by	Original release date	Prod. code	U.S. viewers (millions)
41	1	"Falafel's Passion"	Written by : Michael Gendi; Storyboarded by : Natasha L. Barredo and Brandon Williams	Eric Acosta, George Gendi, Michael Gendi, Deepak Sethi, and Sean Szeles	July 21, 2020	201	0.24
Apple and Onion must stop Falafel from humiliating himself on a national TV show. Songs: "Sabotaging Falafel"
42	2	"Hole in Roof"	Written by : Eric Acosta; Storyboarded by : Sam Spina and Kristen Woo	Eric Acosta, George Gendi, Michael Gendi, Deepak Sethi, and Sean Szeles	July 22, 2020	202	0.23
Apple and Onion must repair the hole in their roof before the impending storm of the century. Songs: "We Love Junk"
43	3	"Patty's Law"	Written by : Deepak Sethi; Storyboarded by : Bryan Mann and Bea Ritter	Eric Acosta, George Gendi, Michael Gendi, Deepak Sethi, and Sean Szeles	July 23, 2020	203	0.20
Apple and Onion must look after a sick Falafel in order to go parasailing.
44	4	"The Eater"	Written by : Deepak Sethi; Storyboarded by : John Mathot, Bea Ritter, and Brandon Williams	Eric Acosta, George Gendi, Michael Gendi, Deepak Sethi, Sean Szeles, and David Ochs	October 12, 2020	204	0.25
On Halloween, Apple & Onion take on a monster in a parallel universe in order to get back home.
45	5	"Apple & Onion's Booth"	Written by : Eric Acosta; Storyboarded by : Natasha Barredo and Brandon Williams	Eric Acosta, George Gendi, Michael Gendi, Deepak Sethi, and Sean Szeles	October 13, 2020	205	0.20
Apple & Onion must save their favorite booth at Pizza's Diner from a Texas oil tycoon.
46	6	"Ferekh"	Written by : Deepak Sethi; Storyboarded by : Sam Spina and Kristen Woo	Eric Acosta, George Gendi, Michael Gendi, Deepak Sethi, and Sean Szeles	October 14, 2020	206	0.19
Apple and Onion have to get Falafel's beloved rooster back from scientists.
47	7	"Pat on the Head"	Written by : Michael Gendi; Storyboarded by : Bryan Mann and Bea Ritter	Eric Acosta, George Gendi, Michael Gendi, Deepak Sethi, and Sean Szeles	October 15, 2020	207	0.21
When Onion is hypnotized, Apple tries to bring him back to normal in order for them to cook for the queen of England.
48	8	"Falafel's Glory"	Written by : Eric Acosta; Storyboarded by : Brendan Regulinski and Aimee Steinberger	Eric Acosta, George Gendi, Michael Gendi, Deepak Sethi, and Sean Szeles	October 16, 2020	208	0.24
Apple & Onion must win a trivia game to get the world's largest meatball.
49	9	"Christmas Spirit"	Written by : Eric Acosta; Storyboarded by : Brendan Regulinski and Aimee Steinberger	Eric Acosta, George Gendi, Michael Gendi, David Ochs, Deepak Sethi, and Sean Szeles	December 5, 2020	209	0.26
Apple and Onion compete with Chicken Nugget to get money on Christmas while working as mall Santas. Songs: "Let's Go Get the Job"
50	10	"Slobbery"	Written by : Deepak Sethi; Storyboarded by : Natasha Barredo and Brandon Williams	Eric Acosta, George Gendi, Michael Gendi, Deepak Sethi, and Sean Szeles	December 18, 2020	210	0.26
Apple and Onion must get rid of Burger’s annoying roommate. Songs: "Getting Your Life in Order"
51	11	"Microwave's Dance Club"	Written by : Michael Gendi; Storyboarded by : Sam Spina and Kristen Woo	Eric Acosta, George Gendi, Michael Gendi, Deepak Sethi, and Sean Szeles	December 18, 2020	211	0.26
To get into a VIP section at a club, Apple and Onion must become famous.
52	12	"All Work and No Play"	Written by : Michael Gendi; Storyboarded by : Natasha Barredo and Brandon Williams	Eric Acosta, George Gendi, Michael Gendi, Deepak Sethi, and Sean Szeles	December 18, 2020	212	0.24
Apple and Onion work very hard to buy an expensive race track, but are too tired to work again. Songs: "Hard Work"
53	13	"Drone Shoes"	Written by : Deepak Sethi; Storyboarded by : Sam Spina and Kristen Woo	Eric Acosta, George Gendi, Michael Gendi, Deepak Sethi, and Sean Szeles	December 18, 2020	213	0.21
Apple and Onion must find a strong enough power supply for their new drone shoes. Songs: "Making the Drone Shoes"
54	14	"Walking on the Ceiling"	Written by : Eric Acosta; Storyboarded by : Natasha Barredo and Brandon Williams	Eric Acosta, George Gendi, Michael Gendi, and Deepak Sethi	April 12, 2021	214	0.20
Apple and Onion need to get down from being stuck on the ceiling of a bridge. Songs: "Making the Magnet Shoes" Note: The opening sequence is different from this episode onwards.
55	15	"Keep It Fresh"	Written by : Deepak Sethi; Storyboarded by : Sam Spina and Kristin Woo	Eric Acosta, George Gendi, Michael Gendi, and Deepak Sethi	April 12, 2021	215	0.20
Apple and Onion need to refrigerate a sandwich before it expires.
56	16	"Panamanian Night Monkey"	Written by : Deepak Sethi; Storyboarded by : Andrea Joan Cabral and Bea Ritter	Eric Acosta, George Gendi, Michael Gendi, Abed Gheith and Deepak Sethi	April 13, 2021	216	0.15
Apple and Onion must become zebras to see their favorite monkey at the zoo.
57	17	"Za"	Written by : Michael Gendi; Storyboarded by : Brendan Regulinski and Aimee Steinberger	Eric Acosta, George Gendi, Michael Gendi, Abed Gheith and Deepak Sethi	April 13, 2021	217	0.14
To help Pizza's Diner, Apple and Onion give it a complete makeover.
58	18	"Broccoli"	Written by : Eric Acosta; Storyboarded by : Natasha Barredo and Brandon Williams	Eric Acosta, George Gendi, Michael Gendi, and Deepak Sethi	April 14, 2021	218	0.30
Apple and Onion must get Hoagie to finish replacing their building's roof so that they can get on with their lives.
59	19	"Cousin's Day"	Written by : Michael Gendi; Storyboarded by : Sam Spina and Kristen Woo	Eric Acosta, George Gendi, Michael Gendi, and Deepak Sethi	April 14, 2021	219	0.25
Apple and Onion have to sell a lot of Cousin's Day mugs before Patty gets back from vacation.
60	20	"Nothing Can Stop Us"	Written by : Eric Acosta; Storyboarded by : Andrea Joan Cabral and Bea Ritter	Eric Acosta, George Gendi, Michael Gendi, and Deepak Sethi	April 15, 2021	220	0.17
Apple and Onion have to get Hot Dog his toupée before an important audition.
61	21	"Good Job"	Written by : Deepak Sethi; Storyboarded by : Brendan Regulinski and Aimee Steinberger	Eric Acosta, George Gendi, Michael Gendi, and Deepak Sethi	April 15, 2021	221	0.17
Apple and Onion need to get the building tenants to appreciate Falafel more.
62	22	"One Hit Wonder"	Written by : Michael Gendi; Storyboarded by : Natasha Barredo and Sam Spina	Eric Acosta, George Gendi, Michael Gendi, and Deepak Sethi	April 16, 2021	222	0.18
Apple and Onion have to keep a couple together so they can sing their new love song at the couple's wedding. Songs: "Wedding Song"
63	23	"A Matter of Pride"	Written by : Eric Acosta; Storyboarded by : Brendan Regulinski and Aimee Steinberger	Eric Acosta, George Gendi, Michael Gendi, and Deepak Sethi	April 16, 2021	223	0.16
Apple and Onion feel full of pride, but things do not go well for them.
64	24	"Eyesore a Sunset"	Written by : Michael Gendi; Storyboarded by : Andrea Joan Cabral and Bea Ritter	Eric Acosta, George Gendi, Michael Gendi, Deepak Sethi, and Emma Zakes Green	October 28, 2021	224	0.13
Apple and Onion turn their house into a bed and breakfast in order to get enough money to buy a wall partition to prevent Onion from seeing Apple's hideous poster.
65	25	"For Queen and Country"	Written by : Michael Gendi; Storyboarded by : Natasha Barredo and Sam Spina	Eric Acosta, George Gendi, Michael Gendi and Deepak Sethi	November 13, 2021	225	0.11
Onion confesses his love for the Queen of England. Apple concocts a scheme for Onion to win her heart.
66	26	"Petri"	Written by : Deepak Sethi; Storyboarded by : Maha Tabikh and Natasha L. Barredo	Eric Acosta, George Gendi, Michael Gendi, Deepak Sethi, and Sean Szeles	November 13, 2021	226	0.10
Apple buys a germ culture as a pet. But the duo have to take good care of it or else the creature will grow exponentially, destroying the Earth. Songs: "Imagination Bossa"
67	27	"Lowlifes"	Written by : Eric Acosta; Storyboarded by : Brendan Regulinski and Aimee Steinberger	Eric Acosta, George Gendi, Michael Gendi and Deepak Sethi	November 13, 2021	227	0.12
Apple and Onion find an imaginative way to fulfill their community service, to show Chicken Nugget that he can't call them "lowlifes". Mayor Naise then frames the duo for petty crimes, to trick them to solving the city's many problems through their community service. Songs: "We Are Not Lowlifes"
68	28	"Falafel's Car Keys"	Written by : Michael Gendi; Storyboarded by : Brendan Regulinski	Eric Acosta, George Gendi, Michael Gendi and Deepak Sethi	November 13, 2021	228	0.13
Apple and Onion must find a way to trick Falafel to giving them his spare set of car keys after he lets them borrow his car but they lose his original keys.
69	29	"Sneakerheads"	Written by : Eric Acosta; Storyboarded by : Natasha L. Barredo and Sam Spina	Eric Acosta, George Gendi, Michael Gendi and Deepak Sethi	November 20, 2021	229	0.08
Apple and Onion try to find a way around Mayor Naise's law that states he will inherit the duo's prize sneakers upon their deaths. Songs: "Sneakerheads Crew" and "Jungle Airlines"
70	30	"Filthy Rich"	Written by : Michael Gendi; Storyboarded by : Andrea Joan Cabral and Bea Ritter	Eric Acosta, George Gendi, Michael Gendi and Deepak Sethi	November 20, 2021	230	0.09
Mayor Naise's frequent appearances on a TV show boasting about his wealth make Apple and Onion feel discontented with what they have.
71	31	"Truffle Season"	Written by : Eric Acosta; Storyboarded by : Natasha L. Barredo and Sam Spina	Eric Acosta, George Gendi, Michael Gendi and Deepak Sethi	November 27, 2021	231	0.10
Apple and Onion save Falafel's life. So Falafel won't leave them alone, trying to "serve" them while they use devices to hunt truffles in the forest.
72	32	"Lambporcini"	Written by : Deepak Sethi; Storyboarded by : Andrea Joan Cabral and Bea Ritter	Eric Acosta, George Gendi, Michael Gendi and Deepak Sethi	November 27, 2021	232	0.09
Chicken Nugget mistakes Apple and Onion for valets and entrusts them with his brand new sports car, personally designed by Lambporchini.
73	33	"Jerk Chicken"	Written by : Deepak Sethi; Storyboarded by : Brendan Regulinski and Asha Riser	Eric Acosta, George Gendi, Michael Gendi and Deepak Sethi	December 4, 2021	233	0.17
Jerk Chicken takes advantage of a misprinted coupon for Apple and Onion new pizza delivery service. Songs: "Free Pizza"
74	34	"Open House Cookies"	Written by : Eric Acosta; Storyboarded by : Andrea Joan Cabral and Bea Ritter	Eric Acosta, George Gendi, Michael Gendi and Deepak Sethi	December 4, 2021	234	0.15
Apple and Onion are guilted into buying Jerk Chicken's house after they keep dropping in for free open house cookies.
75	35	"World Cup"	Written by : Deepak Sethi; Storyboarded by : Natasha L. Barredo and Sam Spina	Eric Acosta, George Gendi, Michael Gendi, Deepak Sethi, and Sam Spina	December 7, 2021	235	0.13
Apple and Onion try to relax while borrowing massage chairs, but can't with Falafel's loud, constant cheering for his soccer team. Songs: "World Cup Song"
76	36	"Win It or Bin It"	Written by : Michael Gendi; Storyboarded by : Sam Spina	Eric Acosta, George Gendi, Michael Gendi and Deepak Sethi	December 7, 2021	236	0.13
Apple and Onion win a brand new, fully furnished luxury apartment on a game show but need a positive letter of recommendation from Falafel to claim their prize. Songs: "How do You Move a Building?"

== Shorts (2018) ==
No.	Title	Written and storyboarded by	Original release date
1	"Lift"	Nick Edwards and Matt Layzell	February 11, 2018
Apple, Onion and Hoagie sing a song about an elevator ride while doing one together.
2	"Buff Up My Head"	Matt Layzell	March 11, 2018
Apple sings a song about buffing up his head and Onion decides to tag along with both of them not realizing they're going to be late before Burger's birthday party.
3	"Nothing Else"	George Gendi	March 17, 2018
Apple and Onion sing a song about objects that you could use other things for with surprising results, including themselves stuck in a box.
4	"Sleep"	Nick Edwards	March 25, 2018
Apple and Onion goof around at nighttime when they should be sleeping.
5	"Water"	Benton Connor	April 1, 2018
When Falafel is unable to fix Apple and Onion's water pipes, they take their time to appreciate what water has to offer while singing a special song.
6	"Car"	Jamie Mason	April 5, 2018
When a car alarm goes off thanks to Hoagie (as a burglar), Apple and Onion decide to dance to it, and when Chicken Nugget sees this, Hoagie goes to jail.
7	"Pizza Party"	Jamie Mason	April 6, 2018
Apple and Onion sing a wiry, upbeat song in order to celebrate Pizza's birthday party with a smile.
8	"Goodbye"	Matt Layzell	April 7, 2018
Apple and Onion believe they're leaving their apartment forever, so they sing a goodbye song, but Falafel tells them that they're not leaving, they're just going to change the hat they bought him earlier.
