= Esther Pearl Watson =

American cartoonist and author (born 1973)

Esther Pearl Watson (born 1973) is an American cartoonist, author, illustrator, and painter who lives and works in Los Angeles. She is best known for Unlovable, a comic about an awkward high school sophomore in the 1980s, inspired by a diary found in a gas station bathroom. Watson's work contains themes of personal memory and adolescent angst, drawing upon influences from found media, children's art, folk art, and outsider art. She is represented by Vielmetter Los Angeles, Maureen Paley Gallery in London, Webb Gallery in Waxahachie, Texas, and Andrew Edlin Gallery in New York City.

== Biography ==
Esther Pearl Watson was born in 1973 in Frankfurt, Germany. She grew up in the suburbs of Dallas, Texas and currently resides in Los Angeles, California. In 1995, she earned her Bachelor of Fine Arts from the ArtCenter College of Design in Pasadena, California, followed by a Master of Fine Arts from the California Institute of the Arts in 2012. She cites her eccentric upbringing as a source of inspiration for her "memory paintings," explaining that her father built flying saucers on the front lawns of the family's many successive homes. She also has worked as a commercial illustrator and children's book author. She currently teaches full time at the ArtCenter College of Design.

== Work ==
=== Comics ===
Watson's comic series Unlovable relates the daily struggles of protagonist Tammy Pierce's sophomore year of high school in 1985. Watson gained the inspiration for the character during a road trip when she found a discarded diary amongst a pile of clothes and garbage in a gas station bathroom sink. Unlovable found an audience on the back page of BUST magazine and was later published in several volumes by Fantagraphics. In 2017, it was adapted into an Adult Animated pilot of the same name produced by Cartoon Network Studios. The pilot was released as part of Cartoon Cartoons in 2026.

In 2006, Watson co-authored a book called Whatcha Mean, What's a Zine? with her husband Mark Todd, published by Houghton Mifflin. The book is a DIY guide for creating and publishing a zine. Watson and Todd illustrate the how-to text with collage, drawings, and comics.

For Vice Media, Watson created a comic series called Blood Lady Commandos in 2015. The protagonists, Gail and Phylis, are grandmothers who have been dispatched to battle a drug lord named Tiny Miracle. In an interview Watson explained, "Basically I wanted to retell the story of Rambo, but using a protagonist that you wouldn’t think of in that position, which would be an older lady and her friend."

=== Paintings ===
Although she earned formal art degrees from prestigious institutions, Watson's paintings are frequently compared to folk art, naive art, and outsider art. Crafted from childhood memories, the compositions usually have a few lines of handwritten text in the upper left corner, along with a signature and date. The unique use of perspective and proportions in her "memory paintings" reflects the point-of-view of a child-- with forms looming large over the main figures. In an interview, Watson explained, "I’ve got a story to tell, and I thought this style would work really well for a memory painting, like Grandma Moses. I really like how she would idealize her memories of childhood.”

Although they appear fantastical or surrealistic at first glance, portraying metallic UFOs hovering over quilt-patterned farmlands or suburban storefronts-- Watson's paintings are often autobiographical in nature. She explains in interviews that her father Gene had the habit of building flying saucers on the family's front lawn. Although he believed that he would eventually be able to sell his breakthroughs to private or government investors, Esther eventually came to see her father's creations as a form of outsider art.

In 2015, Watson's mural Pasture Cows Crossing Indian Creek, Comanche, Texas, Looking for the Old Civilian Fort of 1851, North of Gustine and a Mile West of Baggett Creek Church was displayed at the Amon Carter Museum of American Art in Fort Worth, Texas, as part of programing to feature contemporary artists from Texas.

In 2020, Watson shifted focus toward documenting the individual and societal anxieties created by the COVID-19 pandemic, as observed on her daily commute to her studio. Her series Safer At Home: Pandemic Paintings includes 100 small paintings exhibited both online and in person at Vielmetter Los Angeles. Created in the style of an ex-voto, or small votive painting (often depicting a dangerous event that the patron survived and created to give thanks to a saint or deity), the works in this series depict what had become common scenes of social distancing and isolation. She also documented the changing tone of the sidewalk chalk and yard sign messages in her neighborhood for "The Diary Project" in The New York Times.

Watson's paintings have been collected by the likes of Simpsons creator Matt Groening and photographer/performance artist Cindy Sherman.

== Selected publications ==
- Whatcha Mean, What's a Zine?: The Art of Making Zines and Minicomics by Mark Todd and Esther Pearl Watson. Published by Houghton Mifflin Harcourt, 2006. ISBN 9780618563159
- Unlovable, Volume 1 by Esther Pearl Watson. Published by Fantagraphics Books, 2009.
- Unlovable, Volume 2 by Esther Pearl Watson. Published by Fantagraphics Books, 2010.
- Unlovable, Volume 3 by Esther Pearl Watson. Published by Fantagraphics Books, 2014.
- Unlovable, the Complete Collection by Esther Pearl Watson. Published by Fantagraphics Books, 2010.

== Selected exhibitions ==
=== 2023 ===
- Sightings, Sun Valley Museum of Art, Ketchum, ID
- Esther Pearl Watson: A Very Luminous Vision, Vielmetter, Los Angeles, CA

=== 2022 ===
- Esther Pearl Watson: Guardian of Eden, Andrew Edlin Gallery, New York, NY
- Esther Pearl Watson: An Apparent Brightness, Maureen Paley, Marina Di Luna, Hove, UK
- The Magical Mystery Tour Returns, Los Angeles Municipal Art Gallery, Los Angeles, CA

=== 2021 ===
- Esther Pearl Watson, Safer at Home: Pandemic Paintings, Richmond Center for Visual Arts, Western Michigan University, MI
- Esther Pearl Watson: Greenhouse, Vielmetter Los Angeles, CA
- Dust It Off, Webb Gallery, Waxahachie, TX

=== 2020 ===
- 20 Years Anniversary Exhibition, Vielmetter Los Angeles, CA
- Safer at Home: Pandemic Paintings, Vielmetter Los Angeles, CA

=== 2019 ===
- Esther Pearl Watson: Dream Believer, University of Wisconsin-Parkside Fine Arts Gallery, Kenosha, WI
- Mothership, Maureen Paley, London, UK
- Folk Art Collection of John Mitchell from Eureka Springs AR The Stink Eye, Webb Gallery, Waxahachie, TX

=== 2018 ===
- Esther Pearl Watson: Tire Universe, Vielmetter, Los Angeles, CA
- April 14, 1561, Andrew Edlin Gallery, New York
- Good Job Dream Achiever, Webb Gallery, Waxahachie, Texas
- Tire Universe, Vielmetter Los Angeles, CA

=== 2017 ===
- Starship Pegasus, Antonio Columbo Arte Contemporanea, Milan, Italy
- Blackhole Blowout, Webb Gallery, Waxahachie, Texas
- Now More Than Ever, LACE Benefit Art Auction, Los Angeles
- For the Good Times, Sp(a)ce, Pasadena

=== 2016 ===
- The 11th Annual Blab Show, curated by Monte Beauchamp, Copro Gallery, Los Angeles
- The Furies, Visitor Welcome Center, Los Angeles, CA
- Cocoon, Arts Factory, Paris, FR
- Galactic Plains, Gregorio Escalante Gallery, Los Angeles, CA
- Hearsay, Artists Reveal Urban Legends, LosJoCos Gallery, Los Angeles, CA

=== 2015 ===
- Atrium, Amon Carter Museum of American Art, Fort Worth, TX
- New Works, Webb Gallery, Waxahachie, TX
- The Future Arrives, Galleri Galleberg, Norway

=== 2014 ===
- Family Lexicon, Antonio Colombo Gallery, Milan, IT
- Sky, Bedford Gallery, Lesher Center for the Arts, Walnut Creek, CA
- Amazon Solitaire, Center for the Arts Eagle Rock, Eagle Rock, CA
- Explorers, CSC Gallery, McLennan Community College, Waco, TX
- Hexenhaus, 495 Alameda St, Altadena, CA
- With Open Eyes, Grafikens Hus, Mariefried, Sweden
- It’s Not a Circus Without a Big Top, Webb Gallery, Waxahachie, TX

=== 2013 ===
- Esther Pearl Watson, Vielmetter Los Angeles, CA

=== 2012 ===
- Hidden Behind the Stars, Webb Gallery, Waxahachie, TX
- Permanent Collection, Nancy Margolis Gallery, New York, NY
- Cal/Arts MFA Graduate Exhibition, LA Mart, LA
- Fort Beavatron, CalArts Mint Gallery, Valencia, CA

=== 2011 ===
- CalArts Main Gallery, Valencia, CA
- Incognito, Santa Monica Museum of Art, Santa Monica, CA
- Land Of Magic, Lesher Center for the Arts, Bedford Gallery, Walnut Creek, CA
- Women in Comics, Webb Gallery, Waxahachie, TX

=== 2010 ===
- New Works, Webb Gallery, Waxahachie, TX

=== 2009 ===
- Visions of the Future, Billy Shire Fine Art, Culver City, CA
- Texas Instruments, Domy, Austin, TX
- When in Texas act like a Texan, Webb Gallery, Waxahachie, TX

=== 2008 ===
- 3rd Annual LA Weekly Biennial, Track 16, Los Angeles, CA
- Failure, The Lab at Belmar, Lakewood, CO
- Blab Show!, Beach Museum of Art, Kansas State University, Kansas City, KS
- LA Paint, Oakland Museum of California, Oakland, CA

=== 2007 ===
- The Weirding Field, La Luz De Jesus, Los Angeles, CA

=== 2006 ===
- What I Remember, Mendenhall Sobieski Gallery, Pasadena, CA

=== 2005 ===
- Keep On Laughing, Katherine Mulherin Contemporary, Toronto, CA
