= Back to Backspace and Pillywags' Mansion =

Television pilots

- Also known as: Back to Backspace
- Written by: Dominic Bisignano; Amalia Levari
- Directed by: (See § Production)

Production
- Producer: Nate Funaro
- Editor: Rob Getzschman
- Running time: 9 minutes

Original release
- Release: November 12, 2014

Back to Backspace and Pillywags' Mansion
- Also known as: Pillywags' Mansion
- Written by: Sam Marin
- Directed by: Patrick Johnson; Rob Getzschman

Production
- Producer: Nate Funaro
- Editors: Rob Getzschman; Dustin Muenchow
- Running time: 8 minutes

Original release
- Release: November 12, 2014

Back to Backspace and Pillywags' Mansion are a pair of animated television pilots produced by Cartoon Network Studios for Cartoon Network. Back to Backspace was created by Dominic Bisignano and Amalia Levari, while Pillywags' Mansion was created by Sam Marin. The pilots were released on the network's official website in November 2014, to positive critical reception. Bisignano and Levari's pilot was nominated at the 42nd Annie Awards, although it did not win.

== Plots ==
=== Back to Backspace ===
Patti and her coworkers Herschel and Sweatpants, who are brothers, live and work in Backspace, a virtual reality where "deletions"—rejected ideas—are sent. Their boss Yaga tells Patti to look for incoming rejections. At the headquarters of a newspaper company, its CEO rejects a design proposal for a cartoon man named Mustacki, sending the file to the trash and emptying it. After Mustacki is sent to Backspace, Patti calls Yaga for a hovercraft so they can give him a guided tour. Patti and her workers explain that there are three types of deletions: "good-bad" ones, which are sent back; "lousy-bad" ones, which are counseled and repaired; and "evil-bad" ones, which are tortured and shredded. Patti becomes distracted by a group of singing cubes, called soundcubes, and leaves the brothers to explain that "Krampses" are a group of "evil-bad" deletions whom are difficult to purge. Herschel tells that Ranklin, leader of the Krampses, was captured by Sweatpants, but Sweatpants suggests that it was actually Herschel who did so.

Patti collects the soundcubes for herself and then returns to find Mustacki missing. Ranklin had appeared in her absence and is holding Mustacki hostage at the shredder. Patti and the brothers tell Ranklin that Mustacki is already dead, and Mustacki spits out some gummy worms to demonstrate this. Falling for the trick, Ranklin kicks Mustacki away, only to be laughed at for his gullibility. Before escaping to the real world, Ranklin taunts Patti, by suggesting that the others should ask her about how she got sent to Backspace in the first place. When her coworkers and Mustacki ask what they should do next, Patti shrugs it off, tells them that she has to go, and suggests that Mustacki get a job at Backspace. At her abode, Patti houses her soundcubes in a container in such a way that they fit together as a rectangle. On her laptop, she records a song pondering her existence in Backspace.

=== Pillywags' Mansion ===
Pillywags' Mansion uses puppetry and centers upon a fictional variety show within the series, titled The Pillywags Show. The titular Master Pillywags hosts the variety show in his basement, with the help of his servants, Screen (a projection screen with eyes and a mouth) and Greg (a goblinesque creature). In the pilot, Pillywags interviews a pair of inanimate dolls propped up on a shelf before performing a song about love. He then invites a guest onto the set, his neighbor Professor Steve, who has been captured by Pillywags pet monster and is enclosed in its mouth. When asked by Pillywags why his monster chose to swallow him, Steve posits that, due to his small stature, he was mistaken for prey. This brings Pillywags to the topic of size, and, before airing an animated segment on the topic of it, he asks the viewer the question, "is it better to be big or small?" After the cartoon, Pillywags answers the question saying that it is better to be big. As the credits roll, Screen and Greg "take five" before preparing themselves for the next show.

== Production ==
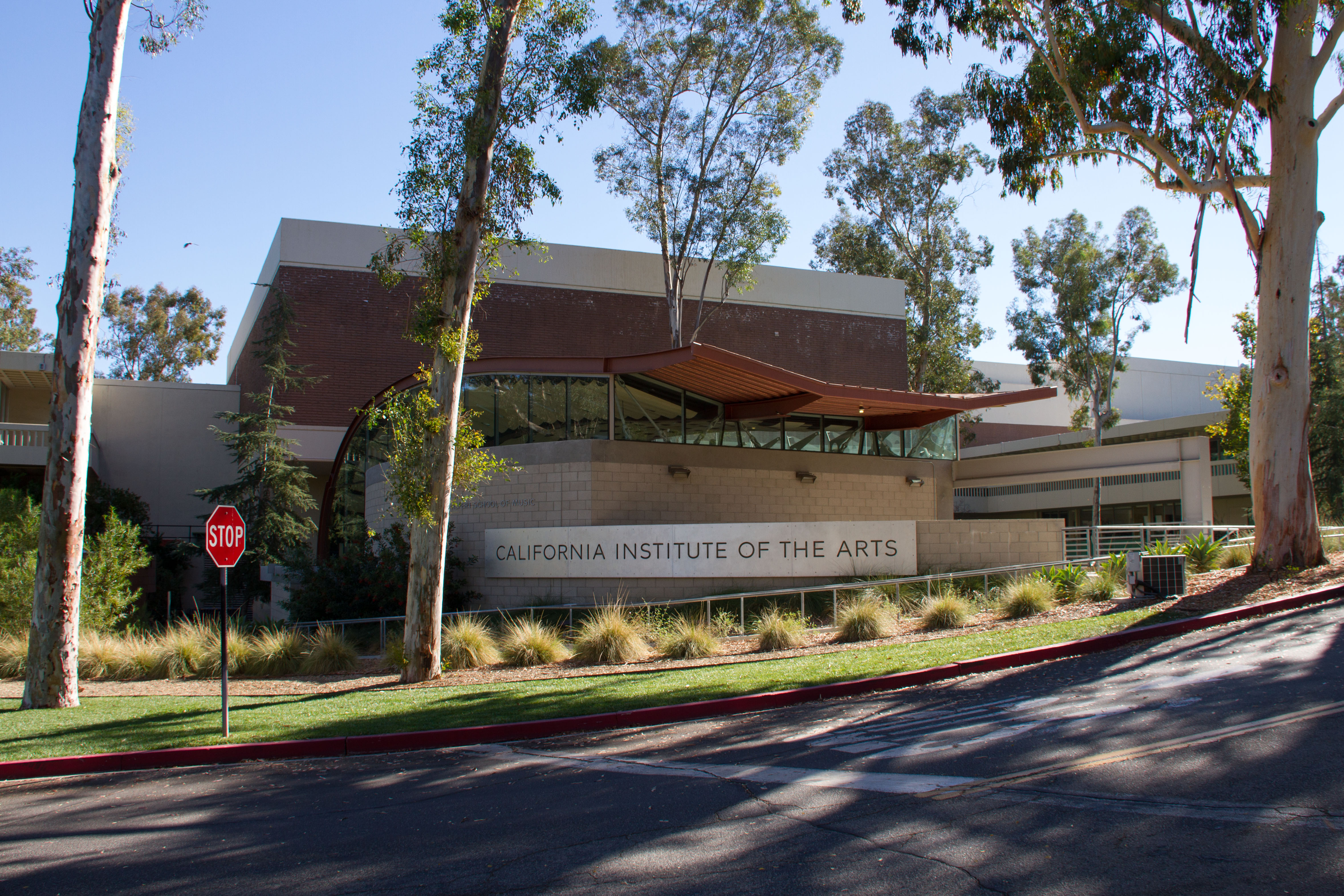
The creators of the pilots are alumni of the California Institute of the Arts.

Back to Backspace was created and written by Dominic Bisignano and Amalia Levari. (Note: Bisignano also served as a storyboarder, background designer, background painter, animatic timer, and musician.) Pillywags' Mansion was created, written, and storyboarded by Sam Marin. All three of them are alumni of the California Institute of the Arts (CalArts). Marin graduated in 2006 and also provides the voices of Benson, Muscle Man, and Pops on another Cartoon Network series, Regular Show. Bisignano and Levari graduated from CalArts in 2008 and 2009 respectively.

Both pilots were produced by Nate Funaro; for Back to Backspace, Mike Roth was a supervising producer. Phil Rynda and Sue Mondt served as creative director and art director respectively for both pilots. Pillywags' Mansion was directed by Patrick Johnson and Rob Getzschman. In Back to Backspace, Amber Benson was cast as Patti; Zosia Mamet as Yaga; Craig Anton as Mustacki; David and Chris Walsh as Herschel and Sweatpants respectively; and Geoffrey Arend as Ranklin. In Pillywags' Mansion, Pillywags was cast as Marin; Greg as Tim Blaney; Screen as Allan Trautman; and Professor Steve as Artie Esposito.

== Release and reception ==
Back to Backspace and Pillywags' Mansion were both released on the official website of Cartoon Network in November 2014. Paul Fraser of 24700, the official blog of CalArts, and Amid Amidi of Cartoon Brew gave both pilots positive reviews. For Back to Backspace, Amidi wrote that, while not a "slick finished" idea, it was one that displayed the potential of both the concept and "its creators", though the latter "doesn't quite hold together". Fraser considered the pilot high-concept, a sentiment that Amidi shared, while Amidi also wrote that it blends in themes of the New Aesthetic "with other contemporary bits like looping machines". Rondal Scott of Strange Kids Club wrote that Pillywags' Mansion had the "overall polish" of Pee-wee's Playhouse, while the blend of animation and puppetry reminded him of his own website. Amidi stated that he "struggled to connect with the characters and concept" but that the use of puppets were at least "on trend".

The Back to Backspace pilot was nominated for "Best General Audience Animated Television Production" at the 42nd Annie Awards, but lost to an episode of The Simpsons.

== See also ==
- AJ's Infinite Summer, a pilot for Cartoon Network released earlier in 2014
- Long Live the Royals, another pilot released simultaneously with AJ's Infinite Summer; now a miniseries
- Jammers, a pilot for Cartoon Network released earlier in 2015
- A Kitty Bobo Show, a Cartoon Network pilot from 2001
- Infinity Train, a Cartoon Network pilot from 2016, now also a miniseries.
