= Apple & Onion =

Animated television series

- Genre: Surreal comedy; Slice of life; Musical
- Created by: George Gendi
- Voices of: George Gendi; Richard Ayoade
- Theme music composer: George Gendi; Matt Layzell; Paul Fraser
- Opening theme: "Apple & Onion" by Richard Ayoade and George Gendi
- Composer: Paul Fraser
- Countries of origin: United Kingdom; United States
- Original language: English
- No. of seasons: 2
- No. of episodes: 76 (list of episodes)

Production
- Executive producers: Sean Szeles; George Gendi; Curtis Lelash; Tramm Wigzell; Jennifer Pelphrey; Rob Sorcher; Brian A. Miller; Sam Register
- Producers: Brent Tanner; Ryan Slater; Michael Gendi
- Editors: Tom Browngardt; Rob Getzschman; Matt Steinauer
- Production company: Cartoon Network Studios

Original release
- Network: Cartoon Network
- Release: June 18, 2015
- Release: February 23, 2018 – December 7, 2021

Related
- Living the Dream

Apple & Onion is an animated television series created by George Gendi for Cartoon Network. Produced by Cartoon Network Studios, the original series premiered on February 23, 2018, and aired a total of 76 episodes over two seasons, broadcasting its final episode on December 7, 2021. It focuses on its titular characters, an anthropomorphic apple and spring onion, who have a childlike view of the world, and their adventures in a predominantly food item-inhabited settlement.

== Characters ==
- Apple (voiced by George Gendi) is an anthropomorphic apple who values his friendship with Onion. He comes to the city hoping to start a new life. He has a much more carefree attitude than Onion and always comes up with new ideas.
- Onion (voiced by Richard Ayoade) is a tall anthropomorphic spring onion ( or 'scallion' in North American English). He is polite and timid and Apple is his best friend. He comes to the city hoping to make new friends the same day as Apple. Onion often works on bringing Apple's ideas to life as well as being the voice of reason of the duo.
- Falafel (voiced by Sayed Badreya) is Apple and Onion's Egyptian landlord, who lets them stay in the shack on top of his building. The show's plot often revolves around Falafel's financial issues or him being overworked. Has a pet rooster named Ferekh for companionship.
- Burger (voiced by Eugene Mirman) is a friend of Apple and Onion and a regular at Pizza's Diner. Burger originally appears as slovenly, but later cleans himself up and gets a job at a fast food stand.
- Hot Dog (voiced by Paul Scheer) is a friend of Apple and Onion and a regular at Pizza's Diner who is an aspiring actor.
- French Fry (voiced by Tasha Ames) is a friend of Apple and Onion and a regular at Pizza's Diner. The pilot featured French Fry as Onion's girlfriend, but the series instead focuses on her being friends.
- Cotton Candy (voiced by Nicole Byer) is a friend of Apple and Onion and a regular at Pizza's Diner.
- Beef Jerky (voiced by Kevin Michael Richardson) is a jailed criminal and an acquaintance of Apple and Onion.
- Apple's Mum (voiced by Penrose Anderson) & Dad (voiced by Adam Buxton) are Apple's carefree parents. They are seen in "A New Life".
- Onion's Mum (voiced by Penrose Anderson) & Dad (voiced by Stephen Fry) are Onion's proper parents. They are seen in "A New Life", with Onion's Dad visiting Apple and Onion in "Rotten Apple".
- Pizza (voiced by Keith Ferguson in episodes 1–10 and Danny Jacobs in episodes 11–76) is a slice of pizza who owns a diner alongside his mother who loves balloon rides. Pizza appears to be overworked in many episodes bearing a sluggish mood.
- Patty (voiced by Dawnn Lewis) is a Jamaican patty who runs the dollar store where Apple and Onion work. Though she is very strict and often serious about finances and honestly, she generally cares for Apple and Onion.
- Lemondrop (voiced by Naomi Hansen) is a young candy lemon.
- Hoagie (voiced by Danny Jacobs in Lift, George Gendi in episodes 1–10, and Roger Craig Smith in episodes 11–76) is a sandwich whom takes residence in the city who is seen in the role of many different occupations. He appeared in the minisode "Lift".
- Chicken Nugget (voiced by Kevin Michael Richardson) is a police chicken nugget who wants others to follow the law and respect him. He serves as the main antagonist of the Apple and Onion. The viewer sympathizes with Chicken Nugget nearing the end of "Hot Dog's Movie Premier".
- Mrs. Lollipop (voiced by Bette Ford) is a kind old lollipop who lives downstairs from Apple and Onion. Her cat was temporarily adopted by Apple & Onion.
- Cheesesteak (voiced by Danny Jacobs) is a short-tempered and grouchy cheesesteak sandwich.
- Samosa (voiced by Kody Kavitha) is a samosa. She owns a fictional game development company named "Samosa Games LLC", which develops the game Sweetie Smash. She appeared in the episode "Positive Attitude Theory" where she doesn't pay her rent.
- Poutine (voiced by Deepak Sethi) is a poutine who owns a local volcano and tries to teach Apple & Onion lessons in conserving power. He appeared in "Drone Shoes" and "Keep it Fresh".
- Jerk Chicken (voiced by Christopher Kid Reid) is a jerk chicken who harasses Apple and Onion by exploiting a pizza delivery coupon, forcing them to deliver pizzas to him at a loss, driving them to ruin. He appeared in "Jerk Chicken" and "Open House Cookies".
- Meatball Wrap & Chip (both voiced by Justin McElroy) appeared in "Falafel's Passion", "The Inbetween", and "Falafel's in Jail".

== Episodes ==
Season	Episodes	Originally released	
Season	Episodes	First released	Last released
Pilot		May 14, 2016	
Shorts	8	February 11, 2018	April 7, 2018
1	40	February 23, 2018	July 20, 2020
2	36	July 21, 2020	December 7, 2021

== Production ==
=== Development ===
Gendi first pitched the idea of the series to Cartoon Network Development Studio Europe whilst working on The Amazing World of Gumball in London, a series that he produced. Upon arriving in Burbank, Gendi approached Cartoon Network Studios with the concept, who greenlit the production of a pilot. The resulting short was selected to be screened alongside another Cartoon Network pilot, Welcome to My Life, at the Annecy Festival on June 18, 2015, before eventually being released online in May 2016.

The short was picked up for a limited series in March 2017, which premiered on February 23, 2018. On May 20, 2019, the series was picked up for a second season.

In February 2022, creator George Gendi announced that the complete series was being streamed on HBO Max, confirming the series had concluded.

== Broadcast ==
Apple & Onion premiered on Cartoon Network UK on August 27, 2018. The show premiered on Cartoon Network Africa on September 29, 2018. In India, it premiered on 2018 on Cartoon Network India.

In the French dub, Apple and Onion themselves are voiced by French rappers Florian and Olivio Ordoñez of the group Bigflo & Oli.
