= Robertryan Cory =

American animator

- Born: Austin, Texas
- Other name: Robert Ryan Cory
- Occupations: Character designer, animator
- Known for: SpongeBob SquarePants; Secret Mountain Fort Awesome; Gravity Falls
- Awards: Creative Arts Emmy Award for "Outstanding Individual in Animation"

Robertryan Cory (also spelled as Robert Ryan Cory) is an American animator known for his work in character design for series such as SpongeBob SquarePants (1999–present) and Secret Mountain Fort Awesome (2011–12), the latter of which he co-developed and earned a Creative Arts Emmy Award for "Outstanding Individual in Animation" at the 64th Primetime Creative Arts Emmy Awards in 2012 for. He has recently worked as lead character designer on season 2 of Gravity Falls (2012–16) and Billy Dilley's Super-Duper Subterranean Summer (2017).

== Early life ==
Cory grew up in Austin, Texas, and was born to musician parents, which called for moving throughout the country frequently. In middle school, he attended a program where he would animate 30-second anti-smoking campaign spots. Cory submitted one for three years in a row; his final spot was banned for being vulgar. He explained that he had fun "doing the inappropriate one with my friends and I just thought this is what I should do when I grow up."

== Career ==
Cory started working in animation at the age of 15 after crashing a party for cartoonists, at which he shared his sketchbook "full of dirty drawings" with the other attendees. He interned at a nearby animation studio before being promoted to inbetweening work. After graduating from high school, Cory attended college where he worked simultaneously as a comics artist for a porn company, where he would animate "money shots" for a series titled Pop-up Porn (a spoof of Pop-Up Video). Although Cory felt that the money was "really great", he quit shortly after questioning the content matter and the direction of his career.

Cory considered Ren & Stimpy "Adult Party Cartoon" (2003; 2006) to be one of his favorite projects to work on, given that his "only goal" when he was younger was to work on The Ren & Stimpy Show (1991–96). Since it had been off the air for nearly a decade, Cory thought that such a task would be "impossible" to do. He called it "one of the worst experiences emotionally", though it provided him with connections to "so many talented people" which motivated him to practice harder on his work. Cory's second favorite experience was his time working on SpongeBob SquarePants (1999–present). Like Ren & Stimpy, he appreciated his co-workers and wanted to discipline himself to "earn their respect".

Cory's work as a character designer for the Secret Mountain Fort Awesome (2011–12) episode "Nightmare Sauce" earned him a Creative Arts Emmy Award for "Outstanding Individual in Animation" at the 64th Primetime Creative Arts Emmy Awards in 2012. For the same episode, he was also nominated for an Annie Award for "Character Animation in a Television Production" at the 39th Annie Awards. His work was showcased in a lecture given to the California Institute of the Arts in 2014, presenting notes for designing characters.

== Reception ==
"Cory has his own idiosyncratic approach—he has absorbed his influences intelligently, filtering them through his own style, and he has evolved his own theories about drawing over the years. But his underlying approach can be distinctly traced to the Spümcø school of cartooning."

— Amidi on Cory's lecture to California Institute of the Arts

Colleague and former co-worker Amid Amidi, of the animation entertainment blog Cartoon Brew, called his approach "idiosyncratic" to his work for Spümcø, working upon his influences while spinning it off into his own style. Gladys Rodriguez of Beautiful/Decay magazine called various sketches of his work on SpongeBob that he posted on his Flickr account "fantastic", albeit she inferred from them that the show had become more violent since she last watched it years before.

== Filmography ==
=== Film ===
Year	Title	Role	Position	Notes	Ref.
2015	The SpongeBob Movie: Sponge Out of Water	—N/a	Character designer	—N/a	
2018	One Crazy Summer: A Look Back at Gravity Falls	Himself	—N/a	Received special thanks credit.	

=== Television ===
Year	Title	Position	Ref.
2003; 2006	Ren & Stimpy "Adult Party Cartoon"	Layout artist	
2005–06	The X's	Character designer	
2005–10; 2012; 2021	SpongeBob SquarePants	Prop and character designer	
2008	The Mighty B!	Character designer	
2010	The Ricky Gervais Show	Character designer	
2011–12	Secret Mountain Fort Awesome	Character designer	
2012	Adventure Time	Storyboard revisionist	
2014–16	Gravity Falls	Character designer	
2017	Billy Dilley's Super-Duper Subterranean Summer	Character designer	
2019–21	Bless the Harts	Character designer	
2021–24	Kamp Koral: SpongeBob's Under Years	Character designer	
2021–present	The Patrick Star Show	Character designer	
