= List of Uncle Grandpa episodes =

This is a list of episodes for Uncle Grandpa, an American animated television series created by Peter Browngardt for Cartoon Network. The pilot episode was created in 2008 and then was aired on Cartoon Network Video in 2010 as part of the network's cartoon showcase, The Cartoonstitute, while the series premiered on September 2, 2013. The show centers around Uncle Grandpa, a goofy and magical human being who stops by children's houses to resolve their problems. He is accompanied by his friends Mr. Gus, a calm, green dinosaur, and Pizza Steve, an anthropomorphic pizza slice who wears sunglasses. On July 25, 2014, the series was renewed for a second season, which premiered on March 5, 2015.

On March 30, 2016, it was reported that the series had been renewed for fourth and fifth seasons by Cartoon Network, but in a different move: they decided to split in half the already-ordered 52 episode-long second season, rebranding the first half as "season two" and the second half as "season three". The already-ordered third season likewise was divided into the newly ordered "season four" and season five".

The series concluded on June 30, 2017, after the series finale "Uncle Grandpa: The High School Years". (Note: The final produced episode is "Exquisite Grandpa", but "Uncle Grandpa: The High School Years" was the final episode to be broadcast.)

During the course of the series, 153 episodes of the series aired over five seasons.

== Series overview ==
Season	Episodes	Originally released	
Season	Episodes	First released	Last released
Pilot	3	May 7, 2010	
1	52	September 2, 2013	February 26, 2015
2	26	March 5, 2015	December 15, 2015
Crossover		April 2, 2015	
Shorts	14	July 9, 2015	July 21, 2017
3	26	December 16, 2015	July 1, 2016
4	26	July 1, 2016	December 15, 2016
5	23	December 16, 2016	June 30, 2017

== Episodes ==
=== Pilot and precursors (2010–12) ===
No.	Title	Written and storyboarded by	Story by	Original release date	Prod. code
1	"Uncle Grandpa"	Peter Browngardt	Peter Browngardt and Chris Reccardi	May 7, 2010	101
A strange man who is the uncle and grandfather of everyone in the world must do battle with a gang of mutants, after an attempt to build a supercomputer to gain the appreciation and love of his favorite nephew goes awry.: Note: Before the advent of the show of the same name, this same pilot was used as "the basis" for the 2011 TV series Secret Mountain Fort Awesome (i.e., the main characters of Secret Mountain Fort Awesome are based on the mutant characters in the pilot).
2	"Secret Mountain Uncle Grandpa"	Pete Browngardt and Audie Harrison	Dave Tennant, Pete Browngardt, and David P. Smith	February 3, 2012	215 (SMFA)
Uncle Grandpa shows up at a lame birthday party and tries to make it cool.: Note: Was shown as the 16th episode of Secret Mountain Fort Awesome.
3	"5 Disgustoids and a Baby"	Pete Browngardt and Greg Miller	Dave Tennant, Pete Browngardt, and David P. Smith	March 15, 2012 (iTunes); March 30, 2013 (Netflix)	106 (SMFA)
Dingle steals Ham Sandwich (from Uncle Grandpa's pilot) and gives him to Festro for his birthday.

=== Season 1 (2013–15) ===
No. overall	No. in season	Title	Animation directed by	Written and storyboarded by	Story by	Original release date	Prod. code	US viewers (millions)
1	1	"Belly Bros"	Robert Alvarez and Randy Myers	Marc Ceccarelli, Ryan Kramer, and Casey Alexander	Dave Tennant, Pete Browngardt, Audie Harrison, and Casey Alexander	September 2, 2013	1019-001	2.16
When a child named Belly Kid experiences difficulties with putting on his shirt due to his big belly getting in the way, Uncle Grandpa tries to make him feel better by going inside a Night Wolf shirt and teaching him about the benefits of having a big belly. Short: "Slice of Life with Pizza Steve – Speed Cycle"
2	2	"Tiger Trails"	Robert Alvarez and Brian Sheesley	Audie Harrison and Casey Alexander	Dave Tennant, Pete Browngardt, Audie Harrison, and Casey Alexander	September 2, 2013	1019-004	2.16
When Giant Realistic Flying Tiger fails to show up during a wizard battle, Uncle Grandpa and his friends follow her trail in order to find out where she went. Short: "Uncle Grandpa Bass the Fishing"
3	3	"Space Emperor"	Robert Alvarez and Randy Myers	Myke Chilian, Fred Osmond, and Casey Alexander	Dave Tennant, Pete Browngardt, Audie Harrison, and Casey Alexander	September 9, 2013	1019-003	1.72
After accidentally sending Melvin who thinks he's a space emperor to an alternate dimension, Uncle Grandpa comes to the rescue.: Special guest stars: Jarid Root as Melvin, and Tim Blaney as Emperor Krell.; Short: "Tiger Talk – Interview with Mr. Gus"
4	4	"Funny Face"	Robert Alvarez and Randy Myers	Dominic Bisignano, Luke Brookshier, and Audie Harrison	Dave Tennant, Pete Browngardt, Audie Harrison, and Casey Alexander	September 9, 2013	1019-002	1.72
Only Mr. Gus can save the day when a funny face head Uncle Grandpa created takes on a life of its own and starts to wreak havoc in the RV. Short: "New Experiences with Beary Nice & Hot Dog Person - Ice Cream"
5	5	"Moustache Cream"	Robert Alvarez and Randy Myers	Ryan Kramer and Marc Ceccarelli	Dave Tennant, Pete Browngardt, Audie Harrison, and Casey Alexander	September 16, 2013	1019-005	1.98
Uncle Grandpa and friends are in a rush to get some emergency moustache cream. Short: "Uncle Grandpa Changes a Lightbulb"
6	6	"Nickname"	Robert Alvarez and Brian Sheesley	Luke Brookshier and Dominic Bisignano	Dave Tennant, Pete Browngardt, Audie Harrison, and Casey Alexander	September 16, 2013	1019-006	1.98
Uncle Grandpa helps a kid called Eric earn his nickname with some intense yard work.: Special guest star: Jarid Root as Spaghetti Legs.; Short: "Mr. Gus' Breakdance"
7	7	"Driver's Test"	Robert Alvarez and Randy Myers	Audie Harrison; Casey Alexander and Andy Gonsalves (additional storyboarder)	Dave Tennant, Pete Browngardt, and Audie Harrison	September 23, 2013	1019-008	1.58
Uncle Grandpa helps Mary earn her drivers' license by showing her how to drive the RV. Short: "Slice of Life with Pizza Steve – Hare Brush"
8	8	"Uncle Grandpa Sitter"	Robert Alvarez and Randy Myers	Marc Ceccarelli, Ryan Kramer, and Audie Harrison	Dave Tennant, Pete Browngardt, Audie Harrison, and Casey Alexander	September 30, 2013	1019-009	1.35
Uncle Grandpa creates a duplicate of himself to babysit him while his friends go out for ice cream. Short: "New Experiences with Beary Nice & Hot Dog Person – Tree Climbing"
9	9	"Uncle Grandpa Ate My Homework"	Robert Alvarez and Randy Myers	Dominic Bisignano and Luke Brookshier	Dave Tennant, Pete Browngardt, Audie Harrison, and Casey Alexander	October 7, 2013	1019-010	1.29
After Uncle Grandpa eats Dennis' diorama of the Pyramids of Egypt, he tries to make it up to him by bringing a real-life mummy to school. Short: "Tiny Miracle the Robot Boy"
10	10	"Uncle Grandpa For A Day"	Robert Alvarez and Brian Sheesley	Myke Chilian, Fred Osmond, and Casey Alexander	Dave Tennant, Pete Browngardt, Audie Harrison, and Casey Alexander	October 14, 2013	1019-011	1.60
After Uncle Grandpa and Belly Bag get stuck in peanut butter jars, it's up to Pizza Steve, and Mr. Gus to give a boy named Guillermo a new bike. Short: "Uncle Grandpa Sings The Classics Vol 1."
11	11	"Afraid of the Dark"	Robert Alvarez and Randy Myers	Myke Chilian and Fred Osmond	Dave Tennant, Pete Browngardt, Audie Harrison, and Casey Alexander	October 21, 2013	1019-007	1.51
Uncle Grandpa helps Susie who is afraid of the dark.
12	12	"Treasure Map"	Robert Alvarez and Randy Myers	Myke Chilian and David Gemmill	Dave Tennant, Pete Browngardt, Audie Harrison, and Casey Alexander	November 5, 2013	1019-015	1.59
Uncle Grandpa, Belly Bag, Mr. Gus, and Pizza Steve follow the map of a kid's menu to find treasure to pay for their meal.
13	13	"Locked Out"	Robert Alvarez and Randy Myers	Pete Browngardt and Ryan Kramer	Dave Tennant, Pete Browngardt, Audie Harrison, and Casey Alexander	November 12, 2013	1019-012	1.44
Uncle Grandpa and Belly Bag get locked out of the RV, and must get back so they, Mr. Gus, Pizza Steve, and Giant Realistic Flying Tiger can go on their mystery dates. Short: "Xarna, She-Warrior of the Apocalypse – Part 1"
14	14	"Jorts"	Robert Alvarez and Brian Sheesley	Ryan Kramer, Marc Ceccarelli, and Fred Osmond	Dave Tennant, Pete Browngardt, Audie Harrison, and Casey Alexander	November 19, 2013	1019-013	1.58
To avoid being laughed at, Mr. Gus tries to get his skin tight jean-shorts off before everyone sees him. Short: "Slice of Life with Pizza Steve – Pizza Party"
15	15	"Brain Game"	Robert Alvarez and Brian Sheesley	Andy Gonsalves and Casey Alexander	Dave Tennant, Pete Browngardt, Audie Harrison, and Casey Alexander	November 26, 2013	1019-016	1.64
Uncle Grandpa and Pizza Steve control Adam's brain to help him become a video game master. Short: "Uncle Grandpa's Story Time Storybook of Stories – The Legend of the Beardman: The Nighttime Tickler"
16	16	"Mystery Noise"	Robert Alvarez and Brian Sheesley	Chris Reccardi	Dave Tennant, Pete Browngardt, Audie Harrison, and Casey Alexander	December 3, 2013	1019-020	1.47
Uncle Grandpa and friends try to find a strange noise that's keeping them all awake. Short: "Tiger Talk – Roommate Problems"
17	17	"Charlie Burgers"	Robert Alvarez and Brian Sheesley	Marc Ceccarelli and Ryan Kramer	Dave Tennant, Pete Browngardt, Audie Harrison, and Casey Alexander	January 14, 2014	1019-017	1.69
Uncle Grandpa and his friends helps a dog named Charlie Burgers get his lost ball back. Short: "Mr. Gus' Work Out"
18	18	"Uncle Grandpa; Shorts"	Robert Alvarez and Randy Myers	Myke Chilian, Audie Harrison, and Andy Gonsalves	Dave Tennant, Pete Browngardt, Audie Harrison, and Casey Alexander	January 21, 2014	1019-014	1.53
As the title says, this episode is entirely divided into three shorts, and they are: 1) "Good Morning News": Uncle Grandpa and friends host a news program. 2) "Cool or Dumb?": Tortoises make decisions on what is cool or dumb. 3) "Uncle Grandpa in Piñata": Uncle Grandpa goes on an accidental rampage while trying to crack open a piñata.
19	19	"Perfect Kid"	Robert Alvarez and Randy Myers	David Gemmill and Myke Chilian	Dave Tennant, Pete Browngardt, Audie Harrison, and Casey Alexander	January 28, 2014	1019-019	1.23
Uncle Grandpa turns a boy named Austin into a robot so he can be perfect.: Special guest star: Shaquille O'Neal as himself.; Short: "UG Rap Attack"
20	20	"Big in Japan"	Robert Alvarez and Brian Sheesley	Luke Brookshier, Dominic Bisignano, and Andy Gonsalves	Dave Tennant, Pete Browngardt, Audie Harrison, and Casey Alexander	February 4, 2014	1019-018	1.36
Uncle Grandpa and friends travel to Japan to help Akira make an action-packed monster movie. Short: "Slice of Life with Pizza Steve – Car Radio"
21	21	"Leg Wrestle"	Robert Alvarez and Brian Sheesley	Myke Chilian and David Gemmill	Dave Tennant, Pete Browngardt, Audie Harrison, and Casey Alexander	February 11, 2014	1019-023	1.48
Uncle Grandpa and Mr. Gus leg wrestle to decide what to watch on TV. Short: "Evil Wizard – Messing with Eddie"
22	22	"Future Pizza"	Robert Alvarez and Randy Myers	David Gemmill, Casey Alexander, and Myke Chilian	Dave Tennant, Pete Browngardt, Audie Harrison, and Casey Alexander	February 18, 2014	1019-022	1.26
Future Uncle Grandpa arrives with a warning that stresses out Pizza Steve. Short: "Board Game Night"
23	23	"Prank Wars"	Robert Alvarez and Randy Myers	Andy Gonsalves and David Gemmill	Dave Tennant, Pete Browngardt, Audie Harrison, and Casey Alexander	February 25, 2014	1019-024	1.37
When Pizza Steve and Mr. Gus engage in a prank war, Mr Gus ends up pulling the biggest prank, only to realize too late that it will get Pizza Steve eaten.
24	24	"More Shorts"	Robert Alvarez and Randy Myers	Marc Ceccarelli and Ryan Kramer	Dave Tennant, Pete Browngardt, Audie Harrison, and Casey Alexander	March 4, 2014	1019-025	1.09
This episode, like the 18th, is entirely divided into three more shorts, and they are: 1) "Homez": Uncle Grandpa gives a tour of the UG-RV. 2) "Weird Man – Volume 1": Uncle Grandpa reads his new comic of Weird Man. 3) "Italian Karate Tournament": Pizza Steve tells the story of how he won the Italian Karate Tournament. Short: "Xarna, She-Warrior of the Apocalypse – Part 2"
25	25	"Viewer Special"	Robert Alvarez and Brian Sheesley	Marc Ceccarelli and Ryan Kramer	Dave Tennant, Pete Browngardt, Audie Harrison, and Casey Alexander	March 11, 2014	1019-026	1.35
Uncle Grandpa announces a contest winner named Kev E. Peepants, who torments him and his friends. Short: "E-mail the Duck"
26	26	"Bad Morning"	Robert Alvarez and John McIntyre	Ryan Kramer and Marc Ceccarelli	Dave Tennant, Pete Browngardt, Audie Harrison, and Casey Alexander	April 1, 2014	1019-021	1.73
When Uncle Grandpa gets out from the wrong side of his bed and says "bad morning" instead of "good morning", Mr. Gus, Pizza Steve, and Giant Realistic Flying Tiger attempt to lift Uncle Grandpa's spirits up. Short: "Uncle Grandpa Cooks a Burrito"
27	27	"1992 Called"	Robert Alvarez and Brian Sheesley	Andy Gonsalves and Nick Edwards	Dave Tennant, Pete Browngardt, Audie Harrison, and Casey Alexander	August 21, 2014	1019-029	1.65
Uncle Grandpa had sent a pair of pants back in time to 1492, but the pants were supposed to go to 1992, and Christopher Columbus won't give the pants back, and if Uncle Grandpa and Pizza Steve don't get the pants back by the end of the day, a guy from 1992 would call the time police on Uncle Grandpa.: Special guest star: Ken Marino as Christopher Columbus; Short: "Shave Time"
28	28	"Bezt Frends"	Robert Alvarez and Brian Sheesley	Ryan Kramer and Marc Ceccarelli	Dave Tennant, Pete Browngardt, Audie Harrison, and Casey Alexander	August 21, 2014	1019-027	1.65
After Uncle Grandpa misunderstood Pizza Steve when he was talking in the third person, he sends Pizza Steve to the moon so, Uncle Grandpa could be Pizza Steve's best friend. Short: "Ghost Math"
29	29	"Food Truck"	Robert Alvarez and Randy Myers	Myke Chilian and David Gemmill	Myke Chilian, Dave Tennant, and Pete Browngardt	August 28, 2014	1019-040	1.50
Pizza Steve had set a goal to raise $13 million to get a jet he fantasized about, so he convinces Uncle Grandpa to start a food truck and sell burger dogs so Pizza Steve could have his jet. Short: "Moments in History with Mr. Gus – George Washington"
30	30	"Hide and Seek"	Robert Alvarez	Casey Alexander	Dave Tennant, Pete Browngardt, Audie Harrison, and Casey Alexander	September 4, 2014	1019-030	1.86
The gang tries to show Uncle Grandpa that hide and seek is not an evil game, but things take a turn for the worse when Uncle Grandpa can't find his friends just like how he couldn't find his old friend Skeletony (Tony). Short: "Bubble Trouble"
31	31	"The History of Wrestling"	Robert Alvarez and Brian Sheesley	Audie Harrison	Dave Tennant, Pete Browngardt, Audie Harrison, and Casey Alexander	September 11, 2014	1019-034	1.69
A documentary about one of the nuttiest wrestling matches to ever go down in history, showing how Chicken Man, The Best, and Mysterious Gus won all of their matches to make it the nuttiest wrestling match to ever happen in history.: Special guest stars: Ric Flair as himself, and Jon Heder as Kev.; Short: "New Experiences with Beary Nice & Hot Dog Person – Imaginations"
32	32	"Sick Bag"	Robert Alvarez	Marc Ceccarelli and Ryan Kramer	Dave Tennant, Pete Browngardt, Audie Harrison, and Casey Alexander	September 18, 2014	1019-031	N/A
After a failed attempt to give Uncle Grandpa his laser hammer, Uncle Grandpa must go inside of Belly Bag to see why he's not feeling well. Short: "Scary Cyborg Guy"
33	33	"Vacation"	Robert Alvarez and Randy Myers	Andy Gonsalves and Jon Vermilyea	Dave Tennant, Pete Browngardt, Audie Harrison, and Casey Alexander	September 25, 2014	1019-033	1.62
Uncle Grandpa is exhausted from helping all the time, and decides to go on vacation, only to find that being Uncle Grandpa is a full-time responsibility.: * Special guest star: Tia Carrere as Island Girl; Short: "Tiger Talk – Cooking with Frankenstein"
34	34	"Aunt Grandma"	Robert Alvarez and Randy Myers	David Gemmill and Myke Chilian	Tom Kauffman, Kelsy Abbott, Pete Browngardt, Audie Harrison, and Casey Alexander	October 2, 2014	1019-044	2.33
Uncle Grandpa has to try to stop Aunt Grandma before she makes everyone forget about Uncle Grandpa. Aunt Grandma only wants to make Uncle Grandpa obsolete so that he could stop taking kids on pointless adventures.
35	35	"Grounded"	Robert Alvarez and Brian Sheesley	Jon Vermilyea and Andy Gonsalves	Dave Tennant, Pete Browngardt, Audie Harrison, and Casey Alexander	October 2, 2014	1019-037	2.33
Uncle Grandpa helps a teen named Riley go to a party only to realize that he has been grounded. Short: "Uncle Grandpa Babies"
36	36	"Haunted RV"	Robert Alvarez and Randy Myers	Marc Ceccarelli and Ryan Kramer	Tom Kauffman, Kelsy Abbott, Pete Browngardt, Audie Harrison, and Casey Alexander	October 28, 2014	1019-047	N/A
For Halloween, Uncle Grandpa throws a haunted house in the RV, a couple of teenagers decide to go first in the RV since every other haunted house didn't scare them. Once they see that Uncle Grandpa's haunted RV isn't scary, Uncle Grandpa improves the haunted RV by putting Frankenstein's brain under the hood of the RV, and it turns the whole RV into a haunted house filled with monsters and the haunted house keeps the teenagers captive, so Uncle Grandpa and friends must go in and save the trapped teenagers.
37	37	"Internet Troll"	Robert Alvarez	Andy Gonsalves and Audie Harrison	Andy Gonsalves, Dave Tennant, Pete Browngardt, and Audie Harrison	December 1, 2014	1019-041	1.59
After Uncle Grandpa uploads a video of himself walking on hot dogs onto the internet, he notices that a teenager named Cheesepuff Mike disliked like the video. Mr. Gus tells Uncle Grandpa that Mike is just an internet troll, but Uncle Grandpa suspects that Mike might be a real troll in disguise, and vows to stop him.: Special guest star: Paul Rugg as Troll; Short: "New Experiences with Beary Nice & Hot Dog Person – Haircuts"
38	38	"Not Funny"	Robert Alvarez and Brian Sheesley	David Gemmill and Myke Chilian	Dave Tennant, Pete Browngardt, Audie Harrison, and Casey Alexander	December 1, 2014	1019-032	1.59
Uncle Grandpa tries to make a girl named Jacqueline laugh at his jokes, but Jacqueline thinks that the jokes aren't funny, so when Uncle Grandpa sees what's going on in her body, he sees a bunch of monsters inside of her that are keeping her from laughing. Short: "Grandpa Cize"
39	39	"Prison Break"	Robert Alvarez and Randy Myers	Myke Chilian and David Gemmill	Dave Tennant, Pete Browngardt, Audie Harrison, and Casey Alexander	December 2, 2014	1019-036	1.47
When Pizza Steve and Mr. Gus accidentally start to prank phone call on a intergalactic phone, they immediately get thrown in intergalactic jail and they must work together to escape. Short: "RV Check Up"
40	40	"Escalator"	Robert Alvarez and Randy Myers	Andy Gonsalves and Casey Alexander	Andy Gonsalves, Casey Alexander, David Gemmill, and Pete Browngardt	December 3, 2014	1019-045	1.56
After a shopping spree at the mall, Mr. Gus heads down to his favorite shop by taking the stairs down, Pizza Steve and Uncle Grandpa decide to take the escalator down, on the way down the escalator stops working and people start panicking that they're stuck on a broken escalator which causes a pandemic around the world.
41	41	"Christmas Special"	Robert Alvarez and Randy Myers	Myke Chilian and Ryan Kramer	Kelsy Abbott, Tom Kauffman, Pete Browngardt, Audie Harrison, and Casey Alexander	December 4, 2014	1019-052	1.55
42	42	"Christmas Special"	Robert Alvarez and Randy Myers	Myke Chilian and Ryan Kramer	Kelsy Abbott, Tom Kauffman, Pete Browngardt, Audie Harrison, and Casey Alexander	December 4, 2014	1019-052	1.55
Part 1: When Uncle Grandpa crashes into the North Pole, he must help his brother Santa Claus deliver the presents and save Christmas. Part 2: The Guardian Lobster shows Uncle Grandpa how his friends would've lived if he didn't exist after he ruins Christmas dinner.
43	43	"Dog Day"	Robert Alvarez and Randy Myers	David Gemmill and Casey Alexander	Kelsy Abbott, Tom Kauffman, Pete Browngardt, Audie Harrison, and Casey Alexander	December 5, 2014	1019-048	1.53
Uncle Grandpa turns into a dog to teach a girl named Sandy how to be a responsible pet owner. Short: "Workout Time for Mr. Gus"
44	44	"Tiger and Mouse"	Robert Alvarez and Randy Myers	Marc Ceccarelli and Ryan Kramer	Dave Tennant, Pete Browngardt, Audie Harrison, and Casey Alexander	December 5, 2014	1019-039	1.53
When Giant Realistic Flying Tiger chases a mouse around the RV, Uncle Grandpa forces them to be friends but he has to face with the problem of the mouse destroying things in the RV along with Giant Realistic Flying Tiger.: Special guest star: Piers Stubbs as English Muffinz; Short: "Lunch Break"
45	45	"Pizza Steve's Diary"	Robert Alvarez and Randy Myers	Andy Gonsalves and Ryan Kramer	Andy Gonsalves, David Gemmill, Kelsy Abbott, Tom Kauffman, and Pete Browngardt	January 8, 2015	1019-049	1.97
After Mr. Gus gets a hold on Pizza Steve's diary believing that it was Peter Pan, Pizza Steve tries his best to get the diary back before Mr. Gus starts to read about his secrets. Short: "Squirrel Sweaters"
46	46	"Ballin'"	Robert Alvarez and Randy Myers	Myke Chilian and David Gemmill	Dave Tennant, Pete Browngardt, Audie Harrison, and Casey Alexander	January 15, 2015	1019-028	1.50
Uncle Grandpa has to go down to the City Court to pay for all of his parking violations but he crashes the RV into a basketball court next to the city court and is challenged by basketball players that want the RV. Note: This episode was released in South America before in the United States. Short: "Smile Juice"
47	47	"Big Trouble for Tiny; Miracle"	Robert Alvarez	Casey Alexander	Dave Tennant, Pete Browngardt, Audie Harrison, and Casey Alexander	January 22, 2015	1019-042	1.90
Tiny Miracle gets a low battery after the gang uses him too much. Short: "Grandpa at Arms"
48	48	"New Kid"	Robert Alvarez and Randy Myers	Ryan Kramer and Marc Ceccarelli	Dave Tennant, Pete Browngardt, Audie Harrison, and Casey Alexander	January 29, 2015	1019-035	1.59
Uncle Grandpa helps a new kid named Tommy at school stand out on his first day, leading to (literally) hair-raising consequences. Short: "How to Draw with Uncle Grandpa"
49	49	"Uncle Zombie"	Robert Alvarez	David Gemmill and Ryan Kramer	Tom Kauffman, Kelsy Abbott, David Gemmill, and Pete Browngardt	February 5, 2015	1019-046	1.90
Pizza Steve thinks Uncle Grandpa has been turned into a zombie, after watching a scary movie. Short: "Who Wants the Last Pickle?!"
50	50	"Uncle Caveman"	Robert Alvarez and Randy Myers	Myke Chilian, Casey Alexander, David Gemmill, and Kenny Pittenger	Kelsy Abbott, Tom Kauffman, Pete Browngardt, Audie Harrison, and Casey Alexander	February 12, 2015	055	1.66
After being hatched out of his egg, Mr. Gus tries to convince Uncle Caveman not to feed him to the other hungry cavemen. Short: "Weird Man – Volume 2"
51	51	"Misfortune Cookie"	Robert Alvarez and Randy Myers	Marc Ceccarelli and Ryan Kramer	Dave Tennant, Pete Browngardt, Audie Harrison, and Casey Alexander	February 19, 2015	1019-043	1.80
Uncle Grandpa receives a fortune from a fortune cookie and takes the fortune very seriously. Short: "Chicken Crossing"
52	52	"Wasteland"	Robert Alvarez and Randy Myers	Nick Edwards	Kelsy Abbott, Tom Kauffman, Pete Browngardt, Audie Harrison, and Casey Alexander	February 26, 2015	053	1.81
Uncle Grandpa gets too lazy and forgets to take the trash out, the trash overflows and Uncle Grandpa gets memory loss, when he wakes up he has to try to find his friends. Short: "Video Date-Maker Plus!"

=== Season 2 (2015) ===
No. overall	No. in season	Title	Written and storyboarded by	Story by	Original release date	Prod. code	US viewers (millions)
53	1	"Duck Lips"	David Gemmill and Kenny Pittenger	Kelsy Abbott, Tom Kauffman, Pete Browngardt, Audie Harrison, and Casey Alexander	March 5, 2015	057	1.63
Uncle Grandpa helps a teenager named Josie increase her internet popularity.
54	2	"Numbskull"	Andy Gonsalves and Jason Reicher	Kelsy Abbott, Tom Kauffman, Pete Browngardt, Audie Harrison, and Casey Alexander	March 12, 2015	056	1.55
Mr. Gus becomes dumb after getting hit in the head by Pizza Steve. Short: "Fix That RV"
55	3	"Body Trouble"	Fred Osmond and Marc Ceccarelli	Dave Tennant, Pete Browngardt, Audie Harrison, and Casey Alexander	March 19, 2015	1019-038	1.44
Belly Bag decides to separate from Uncle Grandpa after a disagreement. Short: "Stinky Elevator"
56	4	"Shower Party"	Andy Gonsalves and Jason Reicher	Kelsy Abbott, Tom Kauffman, Pete Browngardt, Audie Harrison, and Casey Alexander	March 26, 2015	059	1.28
Andrew W.K. comes to host a party at the RV.: Special guest star: Andrew W.K. as himself.; Short: "Dirtbag"
57	5	"Uncle Grandpa Land"	Myke Chilian	Kelsy Abbott, Tom Kauffman, Pete Browngardt, Audie Harrison, and Casey Alexander	May 4, 2015	062	1.00
Uncle Grandpa had created an amusement park with rides featuring all the characters, and when Pizza Steve arrives at a roller coaster about him, he can't get on it because he's too small so he finds a way to sneak on. Short: "Evil Wizard – Laundry Day"
58	6	"Taco Comet"	Ryan Kramer and Marc Ceccarelli	Kelsy Abbott, Tom Kauffman, Pete Browngardt, Audie Harrison, and Casey Alexander	May 5, 2015	061	1.15
Uncle Grandpa, Pizza Steve, and Mr. Gus follows a comet that's also taco to get a chance to eat it, but they must escape it from Area 51 when it lands on Earth. Short: "UG Fairytales – Uncle Grandpa and the Can of Beans Stalk"
59	7	"The Fan"	Marc Ceccarelli and Ryan Kramer	Kelsy Abbott, Tom Kauffman, Pete Browngardt, Audie Harrison, and Casey Alexander	May 6, 2015	1019-051	1.14
Uncle Grandpa meets his number one fan named Nubert. Short: "Xarna, She-Warrior of the Apocalypse – Part 3"
60	8	"The Package"	Marc Ceccarelli and Ryan Kramer	Kelsy Abbott, Tom Kauffman, Pete Browngardt, Audie Harrison, and Casey Alexander	May 7, 2015	058	1.23
Uncle Grandpa, Mr. Gus, Belly Bag and Pizza Steve go crazy trying to open a mysterious box. Short: "New Experiences with Beary Nice & Hot Dog Person – Computer"
61	9	"Are You Talking to Tree?"	David Gemmill and Kenny Pittenger	Kelsy Abbott, Tom Kauffman, Pete Browngardt, Audie Harrison, and Casey Alexander	May 8, 2015	060	1.15
Steve and Gus doesn't believe Uncle Grandpa when he claims a tree has begun talking because a criminal is inside of tree. Short: "Pizza Steve's Killer Abs"
62	10	"Older"	Marc Ceccarelli and Ryan Kramer	Kelsy Abbott, Tom Kauffman, Pete Browngardt, Audie Harrison, and Casey Alexander	May 14, 2015	064	1.14
Uncle Grandpa turns a boy named Phillip into a 300-year-old man, and must return him to normal. Short: "Science Time with Uncle Grandpa"
63	11	"Guest Directed Shorts"	M. Wartella, Pendleton Ward, and Max Winston	(uncredited)	May 21, 2015	1019-050	1.29
This special episode is composed by three shorts, respectively directed by M. Wartella, Pendleton Ward, and Max Winston. They are: 1) "Time Burgers": Uncle Grandpa uses a time machine to sample famous hamburgers from the past. 2) "For Pete! Love, Pen": Uncle Grandpa and Pizza Steve hang out in a park. 3) "Total Reality": Uncle Grandpa is forced to entertain himself with his imagination after the TV breaks. Note: The intro and all the bumpers are directed by Nick Cross.
64	12	"Hundred Dollar Gus"	Zac Gorman	Kelsy Abbott, Tom Kauffman, Pete Browngardt, Audie Harrison, and Casey Alexander	June 8, 2015	054	1.57
Pizza Steve makes up a preposterous lie to Uncle Grandpa in big trouble. Short: "Kung-Fu Turtles" (a Teenage Mutant Ninja Turtles spoof)
65	13	"Weird Badge"	Andy Gonsalves and Jason Reicher	Kelsy Abbott, Tom Kauffman, Pete Browngardt, Audie Harrison, and Casey Alexander	June 9, 2015	065	1.33
Uncle Grandpa helps Emily learn unconventional survival skills that help rescue her troop. Short: "Cutting the Wire"
66	14	"The Great Spaghetti; Western"	Andy Gonsalves and Jason Reicher	Andy Gonsalves, Jason Reicher, Pete Browngardt, Audie Harrison, and Casey Alexander	June 10, 2015	066	1.21
Mr. Gus repeatedly runs afoul by Pizza the Kid while winning the hears of the townsfolk.
67	15	"Pal.0"	Nick Edwards and Myke Chilian	Kelsy Abbott, Pete Browngardt, Audie Harrison, and Casey Alexander	June 11, 2015	067	1.53
The gang must figure out a way to stop the RV's talking computer system when it malfunctions.: Special guest star: "Weird Al" Yankovic as Weird Pal; Short: "New Experiences with Beary Nice & Hot Dog Person – Bath Time"
68	16	"Uncle Grandpa at the Movies"	Kenny Pittenger and David Gemmill	Kelsy Abbott, Pete Browngardt, Audie Harrison, and Casey Alexander	June 12, 2015	069	1.23
Mr. Gus tries to watch a movie peacefully but Pizza Steve and Uncle Grandpa keep causing a ruckus. Short: "Moments in History with Mr. Gus – Leonardo da Vinci"
69	17	"Bottom Bag"	Ryan Kramer and Marc Ceccarelli	Kelsy Abbott, Wade Randolph, Pete Browngardt, Audie Harrison, and Casey Alexander	August 6, 2015	070	1.37
Belly Bag befriends a fellow bag who turns out to have sinister intentions.: Special guest star: Tommy Chong as Bottom Bag; Short: "Cloud Gazing"
70	18	"Watermelon Gag"	Zeus Cervas	Kelsy Abbott, Wade Randolph, Pete Browngardt, Audie Harrison, and Casey Alexander	August 13, 2015	071	1.46
Uncle Grandpa tells how he became a laughing stock when he got an entire watermelon stuck in his mouth. Short: "Frisky Moustache"
71	19	"Uncle Grandpa Babies"	Jason Reicher and Andy Gonsalves	Kelsy Abbott, Wade Randolph, Andy Gonsalves, and Jason Reicher	August 20, 2015	074	1.62
The babies help the president defuse a missile from Foreignlandistan.
72	20	"Birdman"	Myke Chilian and Nick Edwards	Kelsy Abbott, Pete Browngardt, Audie Harrison, and Casey Alexander	August 27, 2015	072	0.98
Birdman makes a new home in the RV's attic.: Special guest star: Jonah Ray as Birdman; Short: "Duck-tor Appointment"
73	21	"Uncle Grandpa Retires"	Marc Ceccarelli, Ryan Kramer, and Casey Alexander	Kelsy Abbott, Wade Randolph, Pete Browngardt, Audie Harrison, and Casey Alexander	September 3, 2015	076	1.22
74	22	"Uncle Grandpa Retires"	Marc Ceccarelli, Ryan Kramer, and Casey Alexander	Kelsy Abbott, Wade Randolph, Pete Browngardt, Audie Harrison, and Casey Alexander	September 3, 2015	076	1.22
Uncle Grandpa fills in for the RV's spare tire and enjoys it so much he decides to remain a tire forever. Note: In this episode, Dick Dastardly and Muttley (from Wacky Races) make a cameo. Short: "Out of Fuel"
75	23	"Fool Moon"	Jason Reicher and Andy Gonsalves	Kelsy Abbott, Wade Randolph, Pete Browngardt, Audie Harrison, and Casey Alexander	October 26, 2015	073	1.10
Belly Bag turns into a werewolf on the night of a full moon after Uncle Grandpa installs a moon roof on the RV. Short: "Untied Shoes"
76	24	"Secret Santa"	Marc Ceccarelli and Ryan Kramer	Kelsy Abbott, Wade Randolph, Pete Browngardt, Audie Harrison, and Casey Alexander	December 3, 2015	102	1.33
Uncle Grandpa and his friends go to the mall to buy a secret santa gift, and end up racing for one of the hottest new toys.: Special guest star: Keith David as Mall Santa
77	25	"Nacho Cheese"	Kenny Pittenger and David Gemmill	Kelsy Abbott, Wade Randolph, Pete Browngardt, Audie Harrison, and Casey Alexander	December 14, 2015	075	0.87
Pizza Steve's dad Nacho Cheese visits and gets on everyone's nerves.: Special guest star: Henry Winkler as Nacho Cheese.
78	26	"Mustache Tree"	Ryan Kramer and Marc Ceccarelli	Kelsy Abbott, Wade Randolph, Pete Browngardt, Audie Harrison, and Casey Alexander	December 15, 2015	077	0.88
Uncle Grandpa travels to the Mustache Tree to stock up. Short: "Garage Sale"

=== Season 3 (2015–16) ===
No. overall	No. in season	Title	Written and storyboarded by	Story by	Original release date	Prod. code	US viewers (millions)
79	1	"The Little Mer-Tiger"	Myke Chilian	Kelsy Abbott, Wade Randolph, Pete Browngardt, Audie Harrison, and Casey Alexander	December 16, 2015	078	0.82
Uncle Grandpa tells his friends how he met Giant Realistic Flying Tiger.
80	2	"Ballroom"	David Gemmill and Kenny Pittenger	Kelsy Abbott, Wade Randolph, Pete Browngardt, Audie Harrison, and Casey Alexander	December 17, 2015	079	1.01
When Mr. Gus fixes up the ballroom, he warns Uncle Grandpa and Pizza Steve not to put one foot in it until the guests leave. But when their ball bounces into the room they have to get it back without touching the ground.
81	3	"Back to the Library"	Andy Gonsalves and Jason Reicher	Andy Gonsalves and Jason Reicher	December 18, 2015	080	0.94
Uncle Grandpa has to travel back in time to return a library book. Short: "Mr. Gus Live"
82	4	"Uncle Easter"	Andy Gonsalves and Jason Reicher	Kelsy Abbott, Wade Randolph, Pete Browngardt, Andy Gonsalves, and Jason Reicher	March 25, 2016	083	0.94
When the Easter Bunny is unable to fulfill his duties, Uncle Grandpa steps in to help with egg-delivery.: Special guest star: Regis Philbin as the Easter Bunny; Short: "Slice of Life with Pizza Steve – Mutant Pizza"
83	5	"King Gus"	Nick Edwards and Myke Chilian	Kelsy Abbott, Wade Randolph, Pete Browngardt, Audie Harrison, and Casey Alexander	March 25, 2016	082	0.94
Things get out of hand when Mr. Gus fulfills a timeless legend and is deemed king of the food court. Short: "Beastoid Bros": Special guest stars: Richard Christy and Sal Governale as the Beastoid Bros
84	6	"The Uncle Grandpa Movie"	David Gemmill and Kenny Pittenger	Kelsy Abbott, Wade Randolph, Pete Browngardt, Audie Harrison, and Casey Alexander	April 1, 2016	088	0.96
85	7	"The Uncle Grandpa Movie"	David Gemmill and Kenny Pittenger	Kelsy Abbott, Wade Randolph, Pete Browngardt, Audie Harrison, and Casey Alexander	April 1, 2016	088	0.96
The gang attends the premiere of Majestico and Uncle Grandpa Boy, a movie about a little girl named Jessica who wants to be a super hero. Short: "New Experiences with Beary Nice & Hot Dog Person – Socks"
86	8	"Lamestation"	David Gemmill and Kenny Pittenger	Kelsy Abbott, Wade Randolph, Pete Browngardt, Audie Harrison, and Casey Alexander	April 2, 2016	084	1.02
Pizza Steve tries desperately to make the others in the RV interested in his new game console. Short: "Oatmeal Day"
87	9	"Space Oddity"	Ryan Kramer and Marc Ceccarelli	Kelsy Abbott, Wade Randolph, Pete Browngardt, Audie Harrison, and Casey Alexander	April 2, 2016	086	1.01
In the year 3021, the gang's intergalactic mission goes awry when a strange alien creature infiltrates their ship. Short: "Football"
88	10	"Relaxation Land"	Jason Reicher and Andy Gonsalves	Kelsy Abbott, Wade Randolph, Pete Browngardt, Audie Harrison, and Casey Alexander	April 9, 2016	094	1.22
Uncle Grandpa's relaxing weekend getaway quickly becomes a spooky nightmare for Pizza Steve.
89	11	"The Land of the Lost Shadows"	Jason Reicher and Jon Vermilyea	Kelsy Abbott, Wade Randolph, Pete Browngardt, Audie Harrison, and Casey Alexander	April 9, 2016	095	0.97
When pieces of their shadows are stolen by a shadow demon, Uncle Grandpa and the gang must travel to the Land of Lost Shadows in order to retrieve them.: Special guest star: MC Hammer as himself; Short: "Waiting for Coffee"
90	12	"Pizza Eve"	Brett Varon and Zeus Cervas	Kelsy Abbott, Wade Randolph, Pete Browngardt, Audie Harrison, and Casey Alexander	April 16, 2016	097	0.95
Uncle Grandpa falls for Pizza Steve's "girlfriend" and ends up in serious danger. Short: "Grampies"; Note: Characters from several Cartoon Network shows appear in this short.: Special guest stars: Natalie Palamides as Buttercup, John DiMaggio as Jake the Dog, Zach Callison as Steven Universe, Roger Craig Smith as Belson Noles
91	13	"The Return of Aunt Grandma"	Kenny Pittenger and David Gemmill	Kelsy Abbott, Wade Randolph, Pete Browngardt, Audie Harrison, and Casey Alexander	April 23, 2016	093	1.04
92	14	"The Return of Aunt Grandma"	Kenny Pittenger and David Gemmill	Kelsy Abbott, Wade Randolph, Pete Browngardt, Audie Harrison, and Casey Alexander	April 23, 2016	093	1.04
Uncle Grandpa's gang joins Aunt Grandma in helping children after seeing a hate video of them.: Special guest star: Mark Hamill as Joss Bossman
93	15	"Messy Bessy"	Zeus Cervas and Brett Varon	Kelsy Abbott, Wade Randolph, Pete Browngardt, Audie Harrison, and Casey Alexander	April 30, 2016	099	1.19
Seth must clean his room and learn to be a neater person in order to keep Messy Bessy from making his life a nightmare. Short: "The Story of Crispin"
94	16	"Memory Foam"	Myke Chilian and Nick Edwards	Kelsy Abbott, Wade Randolph, Pete Browngardt, Audie Harrison, and Casey Alexander	May 7, 2016	096	0.98
When a new mattress sucks away all of PS's memories, UG and the crew must find a way to get them back.
95	17	"Even More Shorts"	David Gemmill, Ryan Kramer, and Myke Chilian	David Gemmill, Pete Browngardt, Kelsy Abbott, and Wade Randolph	May 14, 2016	085	0.79
This is the third normal episode (excluding Guest Directed Shorts) to be composed by three shorts: 1) "Weird Man – Volume 3": Weird Man apprehends a criminal. 2) "Rescuing Kitty": Belly Bag finds a cat stuck in the RV tree. 3) "A Personal Journey with Uncle Grandpa": Uncle Grandpa hosts a space exploration program.
96	18	"Fleas Help Me"	Ryan Kramer and Marc Ceccarelli	Kelsy Abbott, Wade Randolph, Pete Browngardt, Audie Harrison, and Casey Alexander	May 21, 2016	100	0.96
The gang helps Charlie Burgers get rid of his fleas. Short: "Frankenstein Juice"
97	19	"Wicked Shades"	Myke Chilian and Nick Edwards	Kelsy Abbott, Wade Randolph, Pete Browngardt, Audie Harrison, and Casey Alexander	May 28, 2016	101	0.84
When Pizza Steve borrows Uncle Grandpa's sunglasses, he sees things in a whole new light. Short: "Uncle Grandpa's Free Dancing Lesson"
98	20	"Except for Cooper"	David Gemmill and Kenny Pittenger	Kelsy Abbott, Wade Randolph, Pete Browngardt, Audie Harrison, and Casey Alexander	June 4, 2016	103	0.89
In order to rescue Uncle Grandpa and the others from a gang of evil vegetables, a young boy must learn to eat his food. Short: "Moments in History with Mr. Gus – Napoleon"
99	21	"In the Clouds"	Nick Edwards	Pete Browngardt and Audie Harrison	June 11, 2016	105	1.09
Uncle Grandpa helps a boy named Jimmy get his head out of the clouds and focused on his history test. Short: "New Experiences with Beary Nice & Hot Dog Person – Gym"
100	22	"The Lepre-Con"	Nick Edwards and Myke Chilian	Kelsy Abbott, Wade Randolph, Pete Browngardt, Audie Harrison, and Casey Alexander	July 1, 2016	081	N/A
In Ireland, Uncle Grandpa is deceived by a leprechaun just to get the gold he craves. Note: This episode was released first in Europe on March 30, 2016.
101	23	"Fear of Flying"	Marc Ceccarelli and Ryan Kramer	Kelsy Abbott, Wade Randolph, Pete Browngardt, Audie Harrison, and Casey Alexander	July 1, 2016	091	N/A
In Argentina, Uncle Grandpa turns Thiago into a fly to overcome its fear of flying. Note: This episode was released first in Latin America on May 8, 2016. Short: "Sandwich Mail"
102	24	"G'day Mornin'"	Myke Chilian and Nick Edwards	Kelsy Abbott, Wade Randolph, Pete Browngardt, Audie Harrison, and Casey Alexander	July 1, 2016	089	N/A
In Australia, Uncle Grandpa helps a kangaroo collector to be giving a zipper on the stomach as his bag. But this animal is obsessed with collecting all Australia, which was warning of "other Uncle Grandpas". Note: This episode was released first in Latin America on May 13, 2016. Short: "Uncle Grandpa Takes Care with Crazy Baby"
103	25	"Uncle Fashion"	Brett Varon and Zeus Cervas	Kelsy Abbott, Wade Randolph, Pete Browngardt, Audie Harrison, and Casey Alexander	July 1, 2016	087	N/A
In France, Uncle Grandpa helps a child named François that others have good taste of its models clothes, ending up as slaves of an alien. Note: This episode was released first in Latin America on May 8, 2016. Short: "Beach Patrol"
104	26	"Inventor Mentor"	Ryan Kramer and Marc Ceccarelli	Kelsy Abbott, Wade Randolph, Pete Browngardt, Audie Harrison, and Casey Alexander	July 1, 2016	092	N/A
In Italy, Uncle Grandpa brings the future to Leonardo da Vinci to be the Mentor Inventor of a girl named Isabella. But this mentor is not satisfied with the future. Note: This episode was released first in Latin America on May 8, 2016. Short: "Uncle Grandpa's Puppet Show"

=== Season 4 (2016) ===
No. overall	No. in season	Title	Written and storyboarded by	Story by	Original release date	Prod. code	US viewers (millions)
105	1	"Jerky Jasper"	Myke Chilian and Zeus Cervas	Kelsy Abbott and Pete Browngardt	July 1, 2016	106	N/A
Uncle Grandpa tries to meet Pizza Steve's imaginary friend named Jerky Jasper by turning himself back into a baby. Short: "Uncle Grandpa Sings the Classics – Vol.82"
106	2	"Dinosaur Day"	Andy Gonsalves and Jason Reicher	Andy Gonsalves, Jason Reicher, and Pete Browngardt	July 1, 2016	107	N/A
A Dinosaur Day celebration is ruined by Pizza Steve's jealousy.
107	3	"RV Olympics"	Jason Reicher and Andy Gonsalves	Jason Reicher, Kelsy Abbott, and Pete Browngardt	August 4, 2016	124	1.32
Mr. Gus and Pizza Steve compete in the RV Olympics. Note: This episode celebrates the Rio 2016 Olympic Games. Short: "Pizza Steve for President"
108	4	"Uncle Melvins"	Nick Edwards and Myke Chilian	Kelsy Abbott and Pete Browngardt	August 4, 2016	110	1.32
A rock band joins Uncle Grandpa to help a young girl named Lizzy win a talent show. Note: This episode was originally going to be called "Ambient Hostile Takeover", a play on the Melvins album Hostile Ambient Takeover.: Special guest stars: Buzz Osborne and Dale Crover as themselves.; Short: "Rock 'n' Roll Check-up"
109	5	"Uncle Baseball"	Ryan Kramer and Chris Allison	Kelsy Abbott, Pete Browngardt, and Audie Harrison	October 22, 2016	132	1.06
When a Little League team needs help, Uncle Grandpa enlists a few famous baseball players to help.: Special guest stars: Adam Jones, Chris Archer, David Price, Jose Altuve, and Noah Syndergaard as themselves.; Short: "Tiger Talk - How to Make a Breakfast"
110	6	"Costume Crisis"	Chris Allison and Ryan Kramer	Kelsy Abbott, Pete Browngardt, and Audie Harrison	October 27, 2016	131	0.98
Uncle Grandpa makes improvements to a kid named Chet's Halloween costume by turning him into a real candy bar, but things get out of hand when other kids try to eat him. Short: "Evil Wizard – Trick or Treat Ingredients"
111	7	"Uncle Grandpa Runs for President"	David Gemmill and Kenny Pittenger	Kelsy Abbott, Pete Browngardt, and Audie Harrison	November 3, 2016	122	0.97
Uncle Grandpa and Pizza Steve compete in the RV presidential race.
112	8	"Chill Out"	David Gemmill	Dave Tennant, David Gemmill, Audie Harrison, and Pete Browngardt	December 1, 2016	133	0.96
Uncle Grandpa takes a kid named Joey to the North Pole to experience an epic snowball fight. Short: "Slice of Life with Pizza Steve - Surprised You Want Can't"
113	9	"The Bike Ride"	Kenny Pittenger and David Gemmill	Kenny Pittenger, David Gemmill, and Pete Browngardt	December 5, 2016	108	0.59
Pizza Steve keeps a secret from the gang. Short: "The Heavy Breather"
114	10	"Mr. Gus Moves Out"	Chris Allison and Ryan Kramer	Kelsy Abbott and Pete Browngardt	December 5, 2016	109	0.59
Mr. Gus moves out of the RV and Uncle Grandpa and Pizza Steve try to get him back.
115	11	"Hiccup Havok"	Zeus Cervas and Jason Reicher	Kelsy Abbott and Pete Browngardt	December 6, 2016	111	0.66
Uncle Grandpa cures hiccups for a kid named Zeke. Short: "The Uncle Grandpa Wash"
116	12	"MacGuffin"	Jason Reicher and Andy Gonsalves	Andy Gonsalves, Jason Reicher, and Pete Browngardt	December 6, 2016	112	0.66
Uncle Grandpa and a kid named Virginia embark on a dangerous jungle adventure in search of a legendary MacGuffin. Short: "Movie Time with Uncle Grandpa"
117	13	"Gone to His Head"	David Gemmill and Kenny Pittenger	David Gemmill, Kenny Pittenger, and Pete Browngardt	December 7, 2016	113	0.70
Uncle Grandpa's new found confidence makes his head big. Short: "Farty Socks"
118	14	"Pony Tale"	Ryan Kramer and Chris Allison	Ryan Kramer, Chris Allison, and Pete Browngardt	December 7, 2016	114	0.70
Uncle Grandpa grows a ponytail which gains him the attention of a magical pony. Short: "Pizza Steve Song"
119	15	"You Can't Handle the Tooth!"	Zeus Cervas and Ryan Jouas	Kelsy Abbott, Pete Browngardt, and Audie Harrison	December 8, 2016	115	0.72
Uncle Grandpa and Mr. Gus must rescue Pizza Steve from the Tooth Fairy. Short': "Burrito Gets to the Hospital with Uncle Grandpa and Friends"
120	16	"A Gift for Gus"	Myke Chilian and Nick Edwards	Kelsy Abbott, Pete Browngardt, and Audie Harrison	December 8, 2016	116	0.72
Uncle Grandpa's present for Mr. Gus gets loose and causes trouble. Short: "Thunder Fart Throb"
121	17	"Robo-UG"	Andy Gonsalves and Jason Reicher	Andy Gonsalves and Pete Browngardt	December 9, 2016	117	0.70
Uncle Grandpa turns Tiny Miracle into a robot version of himself to help with his duties. Short: "Reflection"
122	18	"Lil' Mac"	David Gemmill and Kenny Pittenger	Kelsy Abbott, Pete Browngardt, and Audie Harrison	December 9, 2016	118	0.70
Mr. Gus' nephew named Lil' Mac terrorizes Uncle Grandpa and Pizza Steve. Short: "Funny Looking Sleep"
123	19	"Disappearing Act"	Chris Allison and Ryan Kramer	Ryan Kramer, Chris Allison, and Pete Browngardt	December 12, 2016	119	0.70
Uncle Grandpa helps a young wannabe magician named Kimmy by teaching her a new trick. Short: "A Lots of Style Check"
124	20	"Tongue Tied"	Nick Edwards and Myke Chilian	Kelsy Abbott, Pete Browngardt, and Audie Harrison	December 12, 2016	120	0.70
Uncle Grandpa helps a shy kid named Ricky gain confidence.: Special guest stars: Maile Flanagan as Ricky and Justin Roiland as the Tongue; Short: "Ule Gapa's Collection"
125	21	"Uncle Dummy"	Zeus Cervas and Ryan Jouas	Kelsy Abbott, Pete Browngardt, and Audie Harrison	December 13, 2016	121	0.77
Uncle Grandpa and Pizza Steve try to convince Mr. Gus that his ventriloquist dummy is alive. Short: "Yoga with Uncle Grandpa"
126	22	"Face Fix"	Ryan Kramer and Chris Allison	Ryan Kramer, Chris Allison, and Pete Browngardt	December 13, 2016	123	0.77
Uncle Grandpa and Pizza Steve help Mr. Gus try to get his face back to normal before an important photo shoot. Short: "Private Eye Uncle Grandpa"
127	23	"The Phone Call"	Zeus Cervas and Andy Gonsalves	Kelsy Abbott, Audie Harrison, and Pete Browngardt	December 14, 2016	125	0.63
A threatening phone call from a stranger causes the gang to panic. Short: "Birds Can Live With Them And Without Them"
128	24	"Uncle Cupid"	Nick Edwards and Myke Chilian	Kelsy Abbott, Pete Browngardt, and Audie Harrison	December 14, 2016	126	0.63
Uncle Grandpa gives a lovesick Cupid some dating advice.: Special guest star: Greg Proops as Cupid; Short: "New Experiences with Beary Nice & Hot Dog Person – Restaurant"
129	25	"Doctor Visit"	Andy Gonsalves and Jason Reicher	Andy Gonsalves, Jason Reicher, and Pete Browngardt	December 15, 2016	127	0.75
Uncle Grandpa gets a vaccine at the doctor's office. Short: "Stranded"
130	26	"Cake Mistake"	David Gemmill and Kenny Pittenger	David Gemmill, Kenny Pittenger, and Pete Browngardt	December 15, 2016	128	0.75
Uncle Grandpa and Mr. Gus accidentally eat Pizza Steve's birthday cake for his mom and must try not to tell him. Short: "Super Cloud"

=== Season 5 (2016–17) ===
No. overall	No. in season	Title	Written and storyboarded by	Story by	Original release date	Prod. code	US viewers (millions)
131	1	"Sheep Deprivation"	Chris Allison and Ryan Kramer	Chris Allison, Ryan Kramer, and Pete Browngardt	December 16, 2016	129	0.85
Uncle Grandpa helps a girl named Wen fall asleep by counting sheep, but one goes missing. Short: "Sun of a Dra-Gun"
132	2	"Trash Cat"	Nick Edwards	Audie Harrison and Pete Browngardt	December 16, 2016	134	0.85
Uncle Grandpa helps out a stinky cat named Milton who's down on his luck. Short: "Is This Funny?"
133	3	"Uncle Grandpa's Odd-yssey"	Myke Chilian	Kelsy Abbott, Audie Harrison, and Pete Browngardt	June 6, 2017	148	0.88
Uncle Grandpa and the gang must retrieve Tiger from the pound before she's adopted out in a musical-style episode.: Special guest stars: Tyler the Creator as the Construction Manager, Bill Moseley as Quirky Salesman, Arlene and Angel Deradoorian as the Hair Mermaids, and Justin Pearson as Free Sample Elf
134	4	"Surprise Party"	Ryan Kramer and Chris Allison	Ryan Kramer, Chris Allison, and Pete Browngardt	June 6, 2017	149	0.83
Mr. Gus and Belly Bag are throwing a surprise party for Pizza Steve, as long as Uncle Grandpa doesn't spoil their surprise. Short: "D&J's Plumbing Service"
135	5	"Late Night Good Morning with Uncle Grandpa"	Andy Gonsalves	Andy Gonsalves, Kelsy Abbott, Audie Harrison, and Pete Browngardt	June 7, 2017	155	0.60
Uncle Grandpa hosts a talk show featuring bands such as Mr. Gus and the Jurassic Jam, Giant Realistic Flying Rock Band and an appearance by Pizza Steve and a talking baloney sandwich.: Special guest star: Marky Ramone as himself.
136	6	"New Direction"	Andres Salaff	Kelsy Abbott, Audie Harrison, and Pete Browngardt	June 8, 2017	152	0.79
Uncle Grandpa enlists a famous film director to help a kid named Grant improve his film acting skills.: Special guest star: Robert Rodriguez as himself.; Short: "Inside the Director's Mind with Uncle Grandpa"
137	7	"Anger Management"	David Gemmill	David Gemmill and Pete Browngardt	June 9, 2017	141	0.67
After Uncle Grandpa gets very outraged with how his day has been, Aunt Grandma arrives to make it worse; Uncle Grandpa must try to calm down before he's erased from existence by a rage judge machine.
138	8	"Pizza Steve's Past"	Nick Edwards	Kelsy Abbott, Pete Browngardt, and Audie Harrison	June 19, 2017	143	0.95
Uncle Grandpa and the gang learn of Pizza Steve's past stunt in the food service industry; Pizza Steve wasn't always the Pizza Steve they know and love.
139	9	"Diggin' a Hole"	Nick Edwards	Kelsy Abbott, Audie Harrison, and Pete Browngardt	June 20, 2017	144	0.87
Uncle Grandpa digs a hole, with other Uncle Grandpas down there in the hole. They hang out and plot to take down the Overlord. Short: "Sit on It"
140	10	"Broken Boogie"	Andres Salaff	Kelsy Abbott, Audie Harrison, and Pete Browngardt	June 21, 2017	145	0.79
When the Boogie Man loses his mojo, Uncle Grandpa steps in to help.: Special guest star: Robert Englund as the Boogie Man.; Short: "Uncle Gretel and Pizza Hansel"
141	11	"Uncle Grandpa's Uncle Grandpa"	Andy Gonsalves	Kelsy Abbott, Audie Harrison, and Pete Browngardt	June 22, 2017	147	0.80
After his underwear is stuck too tight, Uncle Grandpa calls upon the aid of HIS Uncle Grandpa; when that Uncle Grandpa fails, his Uncle Grandpa arrives, and things get out of control.
142	12	"Transitional Phase"	Myke Chilian	Kelsy Abbott, Pete Browngardt, and Audie Harrison	June 23, 2017	136	0.69
Trying to enjoy dinner, Uncle Grandpa and the gang keep mysteriously being sent back and forth through time; they realize it's a film transitioning and the editor was sleeping. Short: "Sticky Caramel Apple"
143	13	"Cartoon Factory"	Chris Allison and Ryan Kramer	Chris Allison, Ryan Kramer, and Pete Browngardt	June 23, 2017	139	0.69
Uncle Grandpa visits a cartoon factory to get some answers about his roots (Pete Browngardt stars as a cartoon version of himself). Short: "Where's Uncle Grandpa?"
144	14	"Date with Gus"	David Gemmill	David Gemmill and Pete Browngardt	June 26, 2017	150	0.85
When Uncle Grandpa and Pizza Steve ruin Mr. Gus' night, the two of them go undercover as Mr. Gus' date.
145	15	"What's the Big Idea?"	Ryan Kramer and Chris Allison	Ryan Kramer, Chris Allison, and Pete Browngardt	June 26, 2017	140	0.85
Pizza Steve and Mr. Gus try to help Uncle Grandpa get an idea. Short: "Toast-mania Chaos"
146	16	"Full Grown Pizza"	Jason Reicher and Andres Salaff	Kelsy Abbott, Audie Harrison, and Pete Browngardt	June 27, 2017	137	0.89
Uncle Grandpa makes it hard for Pizza Steve to prove he's not a baby.: Special guest stars: Anders Holm as Deep Dish Dave and Blake Anderson as Ciabatta.; Short: "Guess the Character"
147	17	"More Director Shorts"	Chris Prynoski, Marc M., J.J. Villard, and Mike Carlo	(uncredited)	June 27, 2017	146	0.89
Similar to the other shorts episodes (particularly "Guest Directed Shorts"), this episode is composed of four shorts. 1) "Late Night, Black Light": After the lightbulb in the UG RV living room breaks, Uncle Grandpa plugs in a fluorescent lightbulb, and things get pretty crazy. 2) "I Love My Friends": Uncle Grandpa accidentally breaks a tire that a homeless cat was living in and the gang discuss what to do with him. 3) "Uncle Grandpa vs Mr. Gus": In this Batman vs. Superman spoof, Mr. Gus is ordered by the President to destroy Uncle Grandpa for being too funny, and an epic battle ensues. 4) "Good Morning": Uncle Grandpa says his signature catchphrase to everyone in the world. Note: The bumpers in this episode are directed by Rich Zim.
148	18	"High Dive"	Chris Allison and Ryan Kramer	Ryan Kramer, Chris Allison, and Pete Browngardt	June 28, 2017	153	0.74
Uncle Grandpa helps Samir overcome his paralyzing fear of the high dive. Short: "Professor Potbelly's Super Science Boot Camp"
149	19	"Chess Master Steve"	Andres Salaff and Jason Reicher	Pete Browngardt and Audie Harrison	June 28, 2017	142	0.74
Pizza Steve goes to great lengths in order to beat Mr. Gus at a game of chess. Short: "Picture Imperfect"
150	20	"Tiny Miracle's Tiny Miracle"	Michael Perez, Chris Allison, and David Gemmill	Chris Allison, Pete Browngardt, and David Gemmill	June 29, 2017	154	0.84
Upon seeing the gang have a fun time swimming and eating ice cream, Tiny Miracle realizes he wants to be a real boy. Short: "Moments In History With Mr. Gus: Frederic Chopin"
151	21	"Uncle Greedpa"	Myke Chilian and Casey Alexander	Kelsy Abbott, Pete Browngardt, and Audie Harrison	June 29, 2017	135	0.84
Uncle Grandpa is in need of some extra cash, so he starts charging for his services. Short: "Staring Contest"
152	22	"Exquisite Grandpa"	Pete Browngardt, Audie Harrison, Chris Allison, Andy Gonsalves, Myke Chilian, David Gemmill, Andres Salaff, Ryan Kramer, Nick Edwards, and Casey Alexander	Kelsy Abbott and Pete Browngardt	June 30, 2017	156	0.72
Uncle Grandpa wakes up from a night terror, so he goes to "the one who knows all", who is a mustache man he finds on another planet. Before receiving his help to stop night terrors, he ends up telling him all the dreams he had leading up to the nightmare he woke up from. 1) "A Load of Laundry": An Uncle Grandpa from another planet arrives on Earth to sing a song about clean socks. 2) "The Tortoise and the Hare": In the classic story of the race between the tortoise and the hare, Uncle Grandpa beats them and wins a trophy that turns out to awaken a genie that grants Uncle Grandpa three wishes. 3) "Tree Goblin": Uncle Grandpa and Mr. Gus sing the most annoying song ever to save Pizza Steve from a tree goblin. 4) "Save Hot Dog Person": Uncle Grandpa passes out in the desert after eating a horrible hot dog made by Evil Wizard, he then comes across Hot Dog Person, who is about to be eaten by birds. After a promise to get a hot dog from him, Uncle Grandpa runs off with him, but a change in him makes him throw Hot Dog Person to the birds. This turns out to be a simulation, in which Uncle Grandpa is told he failed. 5) "Uncle Grandpa Tea": Uncle Grandpa arrives to the Uncle Grandpa Tea he made his friends. Tiger, Mr. Gus, Pizza Steve, and Tiny Miracle are unsure about the tea, but after Uncle Grandpa finishes it, he uncovers a fortune telling him and his friends to "Make yourselves a sandwich.", he takes this literally and makes themselves into a sandwich for Ham Sandwich (from the 2008 pilot) to eat, where his nightmare left off. Note: Despite this episode being produced as the series finale, the following episode aired as the final episode.
153	23	"Uncle Grandpa: The High School Years"	Ryan Kramer and Chris Allison	Kelsy Abbott, Audie Harrison, and Pete Browngardt	June 30, 2017	151	0.72
In the series finale that's a flashback that shows the gang in high school, Uncle Grandpa, Pizza Steve, Mr. Gus, Tiger, Frankenstein and Belly Bag are all in detention and while the principal is using the bathroom, they all try to find ways to fight boredom and slowly start to build a friendship. After a fight, they all make up and Uncle Grandpa suggests they all live together and have fun adventures later on in the RV.

== Crossover special (2015) ==
Title	Written and storyboarded by	Story by	Original release date	Prod. code	US viewers (millions)
"Say Uncle"	Joe Johnston and Jeff Liu	Matt Burnett, Ben Levin, Rebecca Sugar, Ian Jones-Quartey, and Kat Morris	April 2, 2015	1031-056 (SU)	1.93
In this non-canon crossover episode, Uncle Grandpa arrives to aid Steven Universe in unlocking the power of his gem.: Notes: The events of the crossover specials take place during the first season of Steven Universe.

== Shorts (2015–17) ==
No.	Title	Written and storyboarded by	Original release date	Prod. code
1	"Uncle Grandpa's Incredible Journey"	Andy Gonsalves	July 9, 2015	136C
Quick clips of false moments from the show's hilarious past and future.
2	"Will It Stick?"	Ryan Kramer	September 1, 2015	136A
Uncle Grandpa and Pizza Steve throw things at a wall to see if they stick.
3	"Bounce House"	Kenny Pittenger	November 2, 2015	136D
Uncle Grandpa turns the RV into a giant bounce house for a kid's birthday party.
4	"Curiosities of Nature"	Kenny Pittenger	December 1, 2015	136B
Animal Documentary host Dirk Peters does a documentary of how the gang fends for themselves in the RV.
5	"Uncle Grandpa 101"	Nick Edwards	September 19, 2016	130D
Uncle Grandpa teaches other grandpas how to be like him.
6	"Here Piggy Piggy"	Myke Chilian	September 8, 2016 (iTunes)	130A
Uncle Grandpa chases his pig through the show's opening sequence.
7	"The Case of the Missing Bike"	Nick Edwards	September 8, 2016 (iTunes)	130E
Detective Frankenstein and Officer Tiny Miracle are on the case to help Katie find her stolen bicycle.
8	"The Origin of Frankenstein"	Chris Allison	October 31, 2016	130C
Dr. Frankenstein's creation is surprisingly very intelligent until Uncle Grandpa arrives.
9	"No Farm No Foul!"	Nick Edwards	December 19, 2016	130B
Uncle Grandpa discovers a box of very old Uncle Grandpa episodes. The gang decides to watch the video reel.
10	"The Weird Zone"	Chris Allison	June 30, 2017	138C
Pizza Steve has the crew do his bidding for fear of being transformed by his mind powers.
11	"Unboxing"	Ryan Kramer	July 4, 2017	138E
Uncle Grandpa and the gang do whatever they can to open a box.
12	"Behind the Scenes"	Andy Gonsalves	July 11, 2017	138D
A behind the scenes look at the cast and crew of Uncle Grandpa.
13	"Spelling Bee"	Ryan Kramer	July 16, 2017	138B
Uncle Grandpa is hosting a spelling bee game show. The contestants, Mr. Gus and Pizza Steve, are competing for the spelling bee trophy.
14	"Coolest Lunchbox"	Chris Allison	July 21, 2017	138A
Uncle Grandpa and the crew are in middle school and about to eat lunch when they compare who has the coolest lunchbox.
