= Secret Mountain Fort Awesome =

American animated surreal comedy television series

- Genre: Surreal humour; Toilet humour
- Created by: Peter Browngardt
- Written by: Peter Browngardt; David P. Smith; Dave Tennant; Fred Belford
- Creative director: Chris Reccardi
- Voices of: Peter Browngardt; Pat Duke; Steve Little; Paul Rugg
- Composer: Mike Conte
- Country of origin: United States
- Original language: English
- No. of seasons: 2
- No. of episodes: 26

Production
- Executive producers: Peter Browngardt; David P. Smith; Brian A. Miller; Jennifer Pelphrey; Curtis Lelash; Rob Sorcher; Nick Weidenfeld; Conrad Montgomery
- Producer: Pernelle Hayes
- Running time: 11 minutes
- Production company: Cartoon Network Studios

Original release
- Network: Cartoon Network
- Release: August 1, 2011 – February 17, 2012
- Network: iTunes
- Release: March 8 – March 29, 2012

Related
- Uncle Grandpa; The Cartoonstitute

Secret Mountain Fort Awesome is an American animated surreal comedy television series created by Peter Browngardt for Cartoon Network that debuted in 2011. The show revolves around a fraternity of five monsters who unleash wild stunts upon the public from their eponymous underground mountain fort.

The series is loosely based on the antagonists that appeared in Browngardt's animated short, Uncle Grandpa, which Browngardt created for The Cartoonstitute. It employs Mike Conte of the heavy metal band Early Man as composer. The show's raunchy, surrealist humor was heavily indebt to the underground comix scene, and received a mixed to negative reception, though it received praise for its art direction.

The show premiered as a sneak peek on August 1, 2011, and had a formal premiere on September 26, 2011. Designers Robertryan Cory and Chris Tsirgiotis both won awards for "Outstanding Individual in Animation" at the 64th Primetime Emmy Awards ceremony. The Uncle Grandpa short that Browngardt had produced was eventually adapted into a full series of the same name, which he felt was a more lighthearted adaptation for children.

The series last aired on television on February 17, 2012, with the remaining episodes being released on iTunes from March 8 to 29, 2012.

== Plot ==
The main characters of the show; clockwise from left: Slog, Festro, The Fart, Dingle, and Gweelok

A race of monsters known as the Disgustoids are banished from society due to their unruly behavior and grotesque appearances. From their sentient and eponymous subterranean mountain fort, they unleash crazy stunts on the public. Their leader, a purple, tusked and underwear-clad monster named Festro (voiced by Peter Browngardt), is a macho party animal willing to do anything to help out his group, even when his help is less than desired. Dingle (also voiced by Browngardt), a scrawny, blue dog-like monster who acts as their faithful pet, intelligible only to the group. Slog (voiced by Steve Little), a furred proboscis monkey-like monster, is likewise blindly loyal, but lacks critical judgment skills – the more hazardous something is, the more likely he will be to follow it. Gweelok (voiced by Paul Rugg), an acned ball of mucus, has a demanding attitude and an obsession with technology. The Fart (voiced by Pat Duke), a monster made of buttocks who farts when touched, is the most sensitive and level headed of the group.

== Production ==
At their 2011 upfront, Cartoon Network announced Secret Mountain Fort Awesome, along with various other series. Billed as a comedy, the show was created by Peter Browngardt and based on his animated short Uncle Grandpa, which garnered praise, a cult following and an Emmy Award nomination. Both were produced at Cartoon Network Studios. Before landing his own show, Browngardt had worked at Augenblick Studios and MTV, as well as on individual programs, such as Futurama, The Venture Bros., Chowder, and The Marvelous Misadventures of Flapjack. Browngardt's work on Chowder began when its creator C.H. Greenblatt looked through one of his pitch bibles that he left at the studio.

The show borrows elements and its design style from his Uncle Grandpa short, which was pitched to the network as a pilot in 2006. According to Browngardt, Cartoon Network executives were unsure about having a series centered on the title character, and felt the monster characters from the pilot had more potential. Character designer Robertryan Cory and David P. Smith (a director and storyboard artist on Dexter's Laboratory and The Powerpuff Girls) were brought on board to help shape the project's development, and the series was animated by the Chinese animation studios Hong Ying Animation (a studio that previously animated Chowder) and Sichuan Top Animation Company.

In an interview with Cartoon Brew, Browngardt called the process of pitching his pilot an "amazing learning experience" because it allowed him to propose an idea to the network and see "how it can manipulate and change while you're working on it". On the show, animation veteran Chris Reccardi served as creative director, whilst Sue Mondt (who had previously art directed Cartoon Network's Camp Lazlo) handled art direction and Robert Alvarez with Larry Leichliter directed the animation. Browngardt depicted the production schedule as "really tight", which called for them to manage their time and to pick their battles with the network.

Referring to his encounters with the network regarding content, Browngardt learned to let go and find the "right balance", as well as to ask himself, "Is my grandma going to notice this?" For the music, Mike Conte of the heavy metal band Early Man was employed as composer. The score, which incorporates heavy metal elements and "lots of riffage", was originally added to the animatics as a rough draft. Browngardt found that it harmonized with the imagery and what he envisioned for the design. Conte noted Browngardt's inspirations from Garbage Pail Kids and Don Martin of Mad magazine, but called the result "definitely its own thing".

== Voice cast ==
- Peter Browngardt
- Pat Duke
- Steve Little
- Paul Rugg
- Clive Revill
- Grey DeLisle
- Pat Fraley
- Tom Kenny
- Donald Gibb
- Heather Halley
- Andy Merrill
- David P. Smith
- Dee Bradley Baker
- Mark Bodnar
- Dee Snider
- Kath Soucie
- Steve Blum
- Brook Chalmers
- Valery Pappas
- Clancy Brown
- Jennifer Hale
- Eric Wareheim

== Broadcast and reception ==
Secret Mountain Fort Awesome premiered on August 1, 2011, on Cartoon Network as part of a sneak preview; this broadcast was seen by 1.8 million viewers. It premiered formally on September 26 as part of their Monday night programming block, where it was seen by 1.3 million viewers, marking a slight decrease from the previous broadcast. The show was moved to Fridays upon its second-season premiere on December 30, 2011. Following the premiere of the eighth episode of the season on February 17, 2012, the show was pulled from broadcast. The network released the remaining eight episodes through iTunes a month later, from March 8 to March 29, thus concluding the show. The reruns aired on Cartoon Planet in January 18 to March 1, 2013. It airs in Canada, the only international released.

The series was panned by critics. Many critics being complimentary towards the series' art style. In his website Lineboil, Aaron Simpson compared it to Garbage Pail Kids and the works of Don Martin, two elements of his childhood. Amid Amidi of Cartoon Brew called Robertryan Cory's character designs "impressive" and "distinctively styled", though he felt the art style's complexity made the limited animation quality suffer as a result. Abby Koenig of Houston Press compared its "ridiculous" nature to the film Little Monsters, and proposed that Howie Mandel (featured in the latter work) guest voice a monster on the show. Shannon O'Leary of Publishers Weekly wrote that the show, along with others on the network such as Adventure Time and Superjail!, bore resemblance to the aesthetics of established independent comics artists. Meanwhile, Jason Krell of io9 considered it a failure despite its influences from Adventure Time, which made way for many successful original series on the network.

The episode "Nightmare Sauce" received multiple accolades, including at the 2012 Annecy International Animated Film Festival for "Best TV Production" (of which Browngardt was the recipient), and at the 64th Primetime Emmy Awards, where Cory and Chris Tsirgiotis were awarded "Outstanding Individual in Animation". Cory also won at the 39th Annie Awards for "Character Design in a Television Production", while Tsirgiotis, Sue Mondt, Daniel Elson and Mark Bodnar were collectively awarded "Production Design in a Television Production". At the 40th Annie Awards, Thaddeus Paul Couldron was nominated for "Character Design in an Animated Television or Other Broadcast Venue Production" for his work on the episode "Secret Mountain Uncle Grandpa".

== Series overview ==
Season	Episodes		Originally released		
Season	Episodes		First released	Last released	Network
1	10		August 1, 2011	December 16, 2011	Cartoon Network
2	16	8	December 30, 2011	February 17, 2012	Cartoon Network
2	16	8	March 8, 2012	March 29, 2012	iTunes

== Episodes ==
=== Season 1 (2011) ===
No. overall	No. in season	Title	Storyboarded by	Written by	Original release date	Prod. code	Viewers (millions)
1	1	"Teleport-A-Potty"	Audie Harrison	Dave Tennant	August 1, 2011	104	1.815
When Gweelok builds a teleport-a-potty, Festro and the monsters search for a place where pizza grows on trees. But when Festro went to go "boom boom" and flushed the teleport-a-potty, the monsters get stuck in another universe where they have to defeat an evil villain named Helmethead in order to reclaim the toilet of the land.
2	2	"Monster Cops"	Clay Morrow, Chris Reccardi, Brett Varon, and Noel Belknap	Peter Browngardt	September 26, 2011	101	1.343
The Disgustoids disguise themselves as cops so they can walk on the surface, but whilst The Fart wants to follow the duties of a cop, all Festro, Gweelok, Dingle, and Slog want to do is pump up the jams.
3	3	"Secret Mountain Fort Love"	Clay Morrow, Noel Belknap, and Brett Varon	Peter Browngardt & David P. Smith	October 3, 2011	106	1.580
The Disgustoids are delighted when Secret Mountain Fort Awesome comes to life and starts wrecking havok on the surface world, but when Fort falls in love with another mountain, Festro tries to break up the relationship, but ends up having to repair his broken heart.
4	4	"The Bet"	Mike Stern	Dave Tennant	October 10, 2011	204	1.567
The monsters bet Gweelok that if he used the Internet within 24 hours, he would have to stop using it at all times so he can hang out with them forever and ever.
5	5	"Nightmare Sauce"	Audie Harrison	Fred Belford	October 17, 2011	201	1.355
Gweelok invents a special sauce to help Festro get rid of his nightmares, but after Festro overdoses on the batch, it causes his bad dreams to run amok in the real world.
6	6	"What It Do, Nephew"	Brett Varon	David P. Smith	November 4, 2011	203	N/A
When Festro's nephews pay a visit to the fort, they turn out to be complete wimps, so the gang teaches them how to be "rude crude dudes with attitude", but their efforts go too far.
7	7	"The 6th Disgustoid"	Audie Harrison	Peter Browngardt	November 11, 2011	206	N/A
After giving all the gang's money to a deposed prince from Nawibawabi, Gweelok needs to find money to pay the fort rent. The Disgustoids try to find a new roommate, but it turns out that she is the prince from Nawibawabi.
8	8	"Secret Mountain Fart Awesome"	Ian Jones-Quartey	Dave Tennant & Peter Browngardt	November 18, 2011	202	0.970
The bros make 1,000 The Fart clones after looking through his diary of juicy secrets, so they try to get rid of them before the real Fart finds out.
9	9	"The Broken Chair"	Mike Stern	Peter Browngardt & David P. Smith	December 9, 2011	207	N/A
When Festro's favourite chair is destroyed, he tries to find out who did it.
10	10	"7,002" "'Secret' Mountain"	Ian Jones-Quartey	Dave Tennant	December 16, 2011	208	N/A
The Disgustoids discover that their newly repaired Megavision has the ability to see into the future.

=== Season 2 (2011–12) ===
No. overall	No. in season	Title	Storyboarded by	Written by	Original release date	Prod. code
11	1	"Party Slog"	Chris Reccardi, Brett Varon, Clay Morrow, and Noel Belknap	Dave Tennant & David P. Smith	December 30, 2011	109
Every time the Disgustoids have a party, Slog turns into "Party Slog" which annoys the bros, but when trouble strikes they need him to do so.
12	2	"Road Trippin'"	Greg Miller	David P. Smith	January 6, 2012	211
The Disgustoids go on a road trip.
13	3	"Dingle Come Home"	Brett Varon	Peter Browngardt & Fred Belford	January 13, 2012	102
When Dingle abandons his friends, they try to get him to come home.
14	4	"Colonel Monster's Monster Time Pizza Palace"	Audie Harrison	Dave Tennant	January 20, 2012	213
When Festro finds out about a place called "Colonel Monster's Monster Time Pizza Palace" he goes there only to get trapped by the people who go there.
15	5	"President The Fart"	Mike Stern	Dave Tennant & David P. Smith	January 27, 2012	215
The Fart is elected as the Disgustoids' new leader when everyone tires of being bossed around by Festro.
16	6	"Secret Mountain Uncle Grandpa"	Peter Browngardt and Audie Harrison	Peter Browngardt	February 3, 2012	216
Uncle Grandpa shows up at a lame birthday party and tries to make it cool.: Note: This is one of the Season 2 episodes of Secret Mountain Fort Awesome, but was another pilot for a new spin-off series called Uncle Grandpa.
17	7	"Festro Gets Glasses"	Stephen DeStefano	Peter Browngardt & Dave Tennant	February 10, 2012	209
Festro gets glasses so he can look smarter, but he thinks wearing glasses means "smort".
18	8	"Funstro"	Greg Miller and Chad Coyle	Peter Browngardt	February 17, 2012	105
Festro experiences a personality change after getting an aching tooth pulled out.: Guest star: Dee Snider as The Tooth Fairy.; Note: The Fart performs a spoken word rendition of the Mr. Belvedere theme song. This is the last episode to air on Cartoon Network
19	9	"Labyrinth"	Ian Jones-Quartey	Dave Tennant & David P. Smith	March 8, 2012 (iTunes)	214
When Gweelok wishes that Jerry, the Goblin King, would come take his annoying friends away, he realizes how much he misses them and has to enter the twisted world of the Labyrinth to rescue them. This is the first time that Gweelok has legs for dancing.
20	10	"Gweelok Cracks"	Brett Varon, Greg Miller, and Chris Reccardi	Fred Belford	March 8, 2012 (iTunes)	108
Gweelok is excited to meet his science idol, but grows more and more frustrated when he starts taking an interest in Festro.
21	11	"Stealing the Sun"	Greg Miller and Chad Coyle	Dave Tennant & Peter Browngardt	March 15, 2012 (iTunes)	103
When the Disgustoids steal the sun and bring it underground, all the elderly people follow.
22	12	"5 Disgustoids and a Baby"	Peter Browngardt and Greg Miller	Peter Browngardt	March 15, 2012 (iTunes)	210
Festro learns the joys and horrors of parenting when Dingle steals Ham Sandwich (from Uncle Grandpa) and gives him to him for his birthday.
23	13	"Family Lies"	Brett Varon	Dave Tennant	March 22, 2012 (iTunes)	212
While travelling to Dingle's family reunion, numerous setbacks keep Dingle and The Fart from making it, until The Fart realizes that Dingle is sabotaging their trip.
24	14	"Wrestlemaniacs"	Chris Reccardi and Audie Harrison	Fred Belford	March 22, 2012 (iTunes)	110
Festro and The Fart take up wrestling and become hugely popular, all in the name of a single french fry.
25	15	"Just for Kicks"	Audie Harrison	Fred Belford & Dave Tennant	March 29, 2012 (iTunes)	107
Festro goes on a quest to Alaska for some Velcro shoes.
26	16	"Secret Mountain Fort Werebaby"	Brett Varon	David P. Smith	March 29, 2012 (iTunes)	205
When a werebaby bites all of the Disgustoids but Slog, they start turning cute, so Slog must find a way to cure their affliction and make them disgusting again.

=== Non‐Existed Season 3 (2012) ===
No. overall	No. in season	Title	Storyboarded by	Written by	Original release date	Prod. code
11	1	"Teleport-2-potty"	Audie Harrison	Dave Tennant	December 30, 2011	109
This is supposedly a sequel to the first episode of the series
12	2	"Friendly Friends Happy Clean Fun"	Ian Jones-Quartey	Dave Tennant	January 6, 2012	211
The Disgustoids Meet an old lady who teaches them how to lie
13	3	"Gwee Squad"	Ian Jones-Quartey	Fred Belford	January 13, 2012	102
Gweelok and the bros get a high-stakes tech support and odd-job call from a major client—the President of the Universe (a character later integrated by storyboard artist/creator elements into OK K.O.! Let’s Be Heroes). The Disgustoids try to prove themselves to human society by handling cosmic-level tech tasks without screwing up, though the pressure mounts on them to act serious
14	4	"Sandwich Mountain Uncle Grandpa"	Peter Browngardt & Audie Harrison	Peter Browngardt	January 20, 2012	213
Uncle Grandpa helps a girl at a prom by thinking she's in love with a sandwich he ate, so he goes down into his own stomach with the girl to rescue the sandwich before it's too late.
14	4	"Ego Maniacs"	Audie Harrison	Dave Tennant	January 20, 2012	213
The disgustoids realise that wearing a shirt saying doo-doo will make the humans accept them after a trip to the mall.

== Spin-off ==
After Secret Mountain Fort Awesome got panned by critics, The Cartoonstitute's original Uncle Grandpa short that Pete Browngardt produced was adapted as the television series Uncle Grandpa. A preview was shown as part of Cartoon Network's shorts development initiative. The series revolves around the title character, who is simultaneously the grandfather and uncle of everyone in the world. Browngardt explained that while the new series would retain some aspects of Secret Mountain, it would be a more lighthearted adaption for children. He ultimately expressed that he wanted "more variety in the music and be able to go [sic] sort of a happier place, though it does go dark and heavy at times".

== Works cited ==
- "2012—The Cristal for best TV production". Annecy International Animated Film Festival. Archived from the original on October 6, 2014.
- "39th Annual Annie Awards". ASIFA-Hollywood. December 5, 2011.
- "40th Annual Annie Awards". Annie Awards. ASIFA-Hollywood. February 2, 2013. Archived from the original on May 1, 2020.
- "62nd Primetime Emmys Nominees and Winners". Television Academy. Academy of Television Arts & Sciences. Archived from the original on October 6, 2014.
- "64th Annual Primetime Emmy Awards" (PDF). Television Academy. Academy of Television Arts & Sciences. September 15, 2012. Archived (PDF) from the original on October 2, 2014.
- Amidi, Amid (October 3, 2011). "Secret Mountain Fort Awesome Talkback". Cartoon Brew. n.p. Archived from the original on October 20, 2014.
- Amidi, Amid (September 2, 2013). "Interview with Uncle Grandpa Creator Pete Browngardt". Cartoon Brew. n.p. Archived from the original on July 7, 2014.
- Andreeva, Nellie (March 23, 2011). "Cartoon Network Announces New Series Slate, DC Nation Block at Upfront". Deadline Hollywood. Penske Media Corporation. Archived from the original on March 21, 2015.
- "Cartoon Network presents a sneak peek episode of Secret Mountain Fort Awesome". Constant Contact. July 28, 2011. Archived from the original on April 21, 2021.
- "Secret Mountain Fort Awesome, Season 2". iTunes Store. Apple Inc. Archived from the original on October 28, 2014.
- O'Leary, Shannon (May 15, 2012). "How Cartoon Network Became a Haven for Some of the Best Independent Comic Book Creators Working Today". Publishers Weekly. PWxyz. Archived from the original on August 8, 2014.
- Krell, Jason (April 18, 2014). "How Pendelton Ward and His Friends Created a New Era of Cartoons". io9. Gawker Media. Archived from the original on September 24, 2014.
- Koenig, Abby (August 31, 2012). "Celebrity Voice Suggestions for Cartoon Network". Houston Press. Voice Media Group. Archived from the original on January 13, 2013.
- Secret Mountain Fort Awesome. Cartoon Network. Turner Broadcasting System. August 1, 2011 – February 17, 2012.
- "Secret Mountain Fort Awesome". TV Guide. CBS Interactive. Archived from the original on October 6, 2014.
- "Secret Mountain Fort Awesome Season 2 episodes". TV Guide. CBS Interactive. Archived from the original on October 6, 2014.
- McLean, Thomas J. (September 11, 2012). "CN Greenlights Steven Universe, Uncle Grandpa Series". Animation Magazine. n.p. Archived from the original on November 2, 2014.
- Milligan, Mercedes (September 26, 2011). "Secret Mountain Fort Awesome Blows Up CN". Animation Magazine. n.p. Archived from the original on September 27, 2015.
- "Monday's Cable Ratings: Pawn Stars Takes Demos, The Closer Wins Total Viewers". The Futon Critic. Futon Media. August 4, 2011.
- "Monday's Cable Ratings: MNF Keeps ESPN Unstoppable". The Futon Critic. Futon Media. September 27, 2011.
- Neilstein, Vince (September 26, 2011). "Early Man's Early Mike Composing Metal Cartoon Score". MetalSucks. n.p. Archived from the original on January 10, 2014.
- Simpson, Aaron (September 15, 2011). "Watch Clips from Secret Mountain Fort Awesome". Lineboil. n.p. Archived from the original on October 6, 2014.
- Zahed, Ramin (October 7, 2011). "Rising Stars of Animation: 2011". Animation Magazine. 25 (8). n.p.: 37–46. Archived from the original on June 6, 2015.
