= Uncle Grandpa =

American animated television series

- Genre: Fantasy; Surreal comedy; Adventure
- Created by: Peter Browngardt
- Creative directors: Audie Harrison; Casey Alexander; Ryan Kramer
- Voices of: Peter Browngardt; Adam DeVine; Kevin Michael Richardson; Eric Bauza; Grey DeLisle
- Theme music composer: Mike Conte; Tommy Meehan
- Composers: Mike Conte; Tommy Meehan
- Country of origin: United States
- Original language: English
- No. of seasons: 5
- No. of episodes: 153 (list of episodes)

Production
- Executive producers: Curtis Lelash; Jennifer Pelphrey; Brian A. Miller; Rob Sorcher; Peter Browngardt
- Producers: Rossitza Likomanova; Audie Harrison
- Editor: Tom Browngardt
- Running time: 11 minutes
- Production company: Cartoon Network Studios

Original release
- Network: Cartoon Network
- Release: September 2, 2013 – June 30, 2017

Related
- The Cartoonstitute; Secret Mountain Fort Awesome

Uncle Grandpa is an American animated surreal comedy television series created by Peter Browngardt for Cartoon Network that ran from September 2, 2013, to June 30, 2017. It is based on Browngardt's animated short of the same name from The Cartoonstitute. Uncle Grandpa is also a spin-off of Secret Mountain Fort Awesome, which was in turn a spin-off of The Cartoonstitute short. It was produced by Cartoon Network Studios.

The show is a surreal adventure comedy that relies extensively on visual gags and catchphrases. Creator Pete Browngardt has cited the work of cartoonists Virgil Partch, Don Martin, Harvey Kurtzman, Gary Larson, and Robert Crumb, as well as Golden Age–era animators such as Tex Avery and Max Fleischer when it came to developing the style of the show. Browngardt also credited John Kricfalusi for his works. Each 11-minute episode is presented in a unique format, consisting of a main seven to nine-minute story, some short bumpers typically composed of a quick visual joke, and an original short that focuses on the show's side characters.

Cartoon Network renewed the series for the fourth and fifth seasons: first splitting the second season (of 52 episodes) into two halves, which respectively became the second and third season, then dividing in half the already announced third season into the fourth and fifth season (of 26 and 23 episodes, respectively), which served as the final seasons.

The series premiered on Cartoon Network on September 2, 2013. While the pilot was nominated in 2010 for a Primetime Emmy Award in the category of Outstanding Short-Format Animated Program, the show itself was awarded in 2014 for the work of Nick Edwards in the category of Outstanding Individual in Animation. Kevin Michael Richardson was also nominated for a Annie Award in 2016 in the category of Best Voice Acting for an Animated TV/Broadcast Production for his work as Mr. Gus in the show. The show on itself received mixed reviews from critics by the time of its release, with praise toward the show's animation and visual humor, while also receiving criticism for its pacing. Retrospective reviews have been more positive, especially after the release of Browngardt's Looney Tunes Cartoons, with critics and viewers alike praising its concept, humor, deranged animation and overall tone.

== Plot ==
The series centers on Uncle Grandpa, a comically dumb, yet magical man who claims to be the uncle and grandpa of everyone in the world. He travels in a large RV and appears without warning in the lives of children who are facing personal problems. These problems are often simple at first, such as fear, insecurity, or confusion. Uncle Grandpa attempts to help, though his methods are chaotic and illogical.

Uncle Grandpa is joined by several regular companions. These include Mr. Gus, an anthropomorphic dinosaur who often acts as the voice of reason. Pizza Steve is a loud, arrogant slice of pizza who believes he is extremely cool. Belly Bag is a fanny pack worn by Uncle Grandpa that can produce almost any object. Giant Realistic Flying Tiger also appears as a recurring character and serves as the mode of transportation for the group.

Episodes usually follow a loose structure. Uncle Grandpa arrives, causes disorder, and eventually resolves the child's problem in an unexpected way. The resolution often comes through surreal events rather than clear lessons. The show does not follow continuity. Each episode stands alone, and events reset afterward.

The humor relies on absurdism, slapstick, visual gags, and meta jokes. The series frequently breaks the fourth wall and ignores normal rules of time, space, and logic. Animation styles may change within episodes for comedic effect.

== Characters ==
=== Main ===
Main characters from the series; from left to right: Uncle Grandpa and Belly Bag, Pizza Steve, Mr. Gus and Giant Realistic Flying Tiger (bottom)

- Uncle Grandpa (voiced by Peter Browngardt), a comically unintelligent, yet magical human who loves helping children with their problems. He wears black overalls with rainbow shoulder straps, a white collar shirt, and a blue propeller hat. His catchphrase is "Good Morning".
- Mr. Gus (voiced by Kevin Michael Richardson), a calm, collected, green muscular dinosaur who wears a white sleeveless shirt and usually serves as the voice of reason among Uncle Grandpa's crew. In the episode "Belly Bros", Uncle Grandpa mentions Mr. Gus as being his bodyguard, however, he is rarely seen putting his life on the line to protect him.
- Pizza Steve (voiced by Adam DeVine), an anthropomorphic prideful slice of pepperoni pizza with sunglasses and a member of Uncle Grandpa's crew of which Uncle Grandpa idolizes. He deems himself to be one of the coolest people in the world and goes out of his way to let others around him know it, even if it means making things up or getting under peoples' skin.
- Giant Realistic Flying Tiger (voiced by Grey DeLisle), a static photographic cutout of a live-action tiger that Uncle Grandpa rides on to get around and communicates by roaring. The only female of the group, her personality is shown to be that of a stereotypical teenage girl.
- Belly Bag (voiced by Eric Bauza), Uncle Grandpa's talking red magic fanny pack and best friend that can produce almost any object.

=== Recurring ===
- Tiny Miracle the Robot Boy (voiced by Tom Kenny), Uncle Grandpa's hand built remote control robot that does tasks around the RV.
- Beary Nice (voiced by Audie Harrison) and Hot Dog Person (voiced by Eric Bauza), are the anthropomorphic bear and hot dog respectively who are the stars of their own recurring segment, "New Experiences". In "Afraid of the Dark", Susie's Beary Nice plush temporarily turns into the monster caused by Susie's and Uncle Grandpa's imagination.
- Charlie Burgers the Ball-Loving Dog Next Door (voiced by Brian Posehn), a talking dog that befriends Uncle Grandpa and his friends.
- Santa Claus (voiced by Bob Joles), the famous figure for Christmas and is revealed to be Uncle Grandpa's brother whom he had a troubled relationship with since 1983 in the Christmas special.
- Frankenstein (voiced by Mark Hamill), based on the character created by Mary Shelly, a tag-along with Uncle Grandpa in his adventures.
- Xarna, She-Warrior of the Apocalypse (voiced by Eric Bauza), is a muscular female warrior who is on a mission to get gas for her Mad Motorcycle. She is a parody of Xena from Xena: Warrior Princess.
- Evil Wizard (voiced by Rob Schrab), a wizard who goes around trying to make everyone's day horrible by humiliating them but he actually makes their lives better and his worse.
- Priscilla Jones (voiced by Lena Headey), Uncle Grandpa's nemesis with a British accent and the main antagonist of the series under the pseudonym "Aunt Grandma", who wants revenge on him for ruining her science project and to usurp him as Aunt Grandma.
- Crispin Mulcahy (voiced by Michael Dorn), a miniature strongman who gets preserved in gold and becomes the RV's lamp. He later reports on the RV presidential election in "Uncle Grandpa Runs for President".
- Timmy (voiced by Tom Kenny), is a boy who wanted a "My Chum Charlie" doll in the episode "Christmas Special", and even slept by the Christmas tree to wait for Santa.

=== Minor ===
- Funny Face Head is a villainous mythical photographic cutout of a live-action human head created by Uncle Grandpa that cannot be trusted as seen in the episode of the same name.
- Bottom Bag (voiced by Tommy Chong), is a villainous fanny pack who is similar to Belly Bag. He is jealous of Belly Bag for being popular and more flexible and tries to replace Belly Bag.
- Ule Gapa (voiced by Tom Kenny), an unfriendly blue big-mouthed alien with four sharp teeth who is constantly yelling at people. He appears first in an intermission when Uncle Grandpa tells Mr. Gus that his own logo is an imposter and destroys it using magic, and he comes out saying "Hey! YOU'RE NOT ULE GAPA, I'M ULE GAPA!".
- Tiny Michael (voiced by Tom Kenny), is a human who primarily appearing in the segment "Tiny Michael the Human Boy". Tiny Michael makes tiny Michael happen whenever somebody needs them. Usually, he ends up making things worse in a comical fashion. His catchphrase is "Did somebody say Tiny Michael?".

=== Human children and adults ===
- Belly Kid (voiced by Zachary Gordon), an boy who has a big belly. He was first ashamed of it, but Uncle Grandpa taught him the best features of having a big belly. He appeared in "Belly Bros".
- Caleb (voiced by Jonathan Adams), a boy that Uncle Grandpa takes out of a math test to go battle Evil Wizard in outer space. He appeared in "Tiger Trails".
- Melvin (voiced by Jarid Root), a bossy boy who likes to play Space Emperor, with him being the emperor. When Uncle Grandpa accidentally sent him into another dimension, he was sent to a planet where he's the emperor. He discovered what it's like being a servant, and learns his lesson after Emperor Krell bosses him around. He loves dinner sandwiches, and hates mayonnaise. He appeared in "Space Emperor". His catchphrase is "I decide who does what!"
- Melvin's babysitter (voiced by Grey DeLisle), an attractive teenage girl with braces who babysits Melvin in the episode "Space Emperor".
- Eric (voiced by Eric Bauza), a boy who doesn't have a nickname, so Uncle Grandpa helps him be legendary to get his nickname. In the process of becoming legendary, he becomes tall and muscular (as a nod to He-Man). In the end he gets the nickname, "Cupcake", because he loves cupcakes. He is named after his voice actor and only appears in "Nickname".
- Mary (voiced by Pamela Adlon), a nervous teenage girl. She takes her driver's test, but fails. Uncle Grandpa takes her on a test and helps her pass. Uncle Grandpa gives her her own "Freedom and Independence USA" truck for passing her test. She first appears in "Driver's Test".
- Dennis (voiced by Tom Kenny), a kid who wanted to finally pass his teacher's hard class and avoid going to summer school, until Uncle Grandpa comes and inadvertently eats his homework, which is Great Pyramid of Giza diorama, and putting Dennis in danger of going to summer school. So Dennis and Uncle Grandpa go to Egypt to get one of the pyramids to make sure Dennis gets an A++++-+ on his project. Dennis appears in "Uncle Grandpa Ate My Homework!".
- "Dr. Ice Cream" (voiced by Dee Bradley Baker), is an anthropomorphic ice cream cone disguised as a licensed human medical doctor who gets tricked by Mr. Gus into telling Uncle Grandpa he is at an ice cream parlor, that way, because Uncle Grandpa is afraid of doctors and shots and blows up hospitals because of this, he won't cause any trouble.
- Mrs. Numty (voiced by Grey DeLisle), Dennis' teacher. She appears in "Uncle Grandpa Ate My Homework!" and "1992 Called"'.
- Guillermo (voiced by Eric Bauza) – Guillermo is a boy who had an awesome new bike until the Perpetual Persistence crushed it. In Uncle Grandpa and Belly Bag's absence, Mr. Gus and Pizza Steve help Guillermo by giving him a trashcan and saying it was a "Magical Uncle Grandpa Bike". Guillermo appears in "Uncle Grandpa for a Day".
- Susie (voiced by Grey DeLisle), a little girl who was afraid of the dark, but learned how to combat her fears by imagining herself as a scary monster. She appears in "Afraid of the Dark".
- Adam (voiced by Dee Bradley Baker), is a kid who couldn't become the master of a very hard video game, until Uncle Grandpa and Pizza Steve shrink to get inside his brain to become better at video games. He would always have his eyes barely open showing that he's been playing video games too much, and his eyes are sore from playing too much. Adam appears in "Brain Game".
- Angry Man Johnson (voiced by Roger Craig Smith), is a grumpy old man who hates Charlie Burgers. Judging by his name, he is always angry at everyone, including Uncle Grandpa. Johnson appears in "Charlie Burgers" and "Fleas Help Me".
- Austin (voiced by Carlos Alazraqui), is a boy who had a lot of imperfections so he asked Uncle Grandpa to turn him into a cyborg called Austin 2.0 to become the most perfect kid, and to eliminate all imperfections. Austin only appears in "Perfect Kid".
- Shaquille O'Neal (voiced by himself), is the former professional basketball player who is an old friend of Uncle Grandpa. In the past, Uncle Grandpa helped Shaq realize his dream of being a stand-up comedian. He appears in "Perfect Kid" after Uncle Grandpa is chased into a comedy club that Shaq was performing at, where he helps Uncle Grandpa fight against Austin in his cyborg form by combining with the audience in a manner similar to a giant robot. Uncle Grandpa finds the jokes Shaq makes to be very funny.
- Akira (voiced by Jessika Van), is a Japanese boy who wanted to make the best action packed monster movie of all time who appears in "Big in Japan". He is named after Akira Ifukube, the Japanese composer who best known for composing several entries in the Godzilla franchise.
- Riley (voiced by Scott Menville), is a teenage boy who fails a test, causing his father to ground demand him to fold laundry all weekend instead of going to a party.
- Josie (voiced by Grey DeLisle), is a teenage girl who was trying to make duck lips for a social media site and tries to get a lot of followers and likes. Josie appears in "Duck Lips".
- Emily (voiced by Susanne Blakeslee), is a girl scout who only appears in "Weird Badge".
- Isabella (voiced by Nika Futterman), is an Italian girl who is an aspiring inventor but her inventions are useless. Isabella appears in "Inventor Mentor".

=== Pilot ===
- Ham Sandwich Jones (voiced by Steven Blum), a rotund nerdy teenager who started out hating Uncle Grandpa, but later grew to like him. In the Secret Mountain Fort Awesome episode "5 Disgustoids and a Baby", he appeared as less responsive, and more stingy while intensely playing a portable gaming system. He can be seen in the show's intro and has a very brief role in "Big Trouble for Tiny Miracle".
- Little Judy Jones (voiced by Grey DeLisle), Ham Sandwich's obese mother.
- Remo (voiced by Tom Kenny), a destructive popular kid who similarly started off hating Uncle Grandpa, but ends up warming up to his antics. He appears in Secret Mountain Fort Awesome episode "Secret Mountain Uncle Grandpa".
- Remo's friends (voiced by Steve Little and Tom Kenny).
  - Kev E. Peepants (voiced by Jon Heder), is a destructive teenager who thought art was dumb until Uncle Grandpa convinced him that art is pretty fun. Kev appears in "Viewer Special". The character originally appeared in a live-action film starring Browngardt called The Last American.
- Crazy Driving Man (voiced by Paul Rugg in the pilot and Wallace Shawn in the series), a man who wears framed glasses, and is the somewhat "uncool" father of his son Remo. He reappears as a driving instructor in the episode, "Driver's Test", and claims to be the father of a Crazy Driving Baby from another universe.

== Episodes ==
Season	Episodes	Originally released	
Season	Episodes	First released	Last released
Pilot	3	May 7, 2010	
1	52	September 2, 2013	February 26, 2015
2	26	March 5, 2015	December 15, 2015
Crossover		April 2, 2015	
Shorts	14	July 9, 2015	July 21, 2017
3	26	December 16, 2015	July 1, 2016
4	26	July 1, 2016	December 15, 2016
5	23	December 16, 2016	June 30, 2017

=== Specials ===
==== Christmas Special ====
The first-season episode "Christmas Special" was aired in December 2014. A double-length Christmas special, it centers on Uncle Grandpa who reluctantly agrees to disguise himself as his brother Santa Claus, after the latter character injures a leg. The episode received mostly praise in international publications, and in the United States it was viewed by 1.5 million. Cartoon Network developed a browser game adaptation named Sneakin' Santa to promote the episode. The episode was well received by the critics during its respective Christmas season.

==== Say Uncle ====
A crossover special between Uncle Grandpa and Steven Universe was aired as an episode of the latter series' second season in April 2015. Conceived of by the creator of the latter series, Rebecca Sugar, the episode has Uncle Grandpa teach Steven how to bear a shield from his gemstone. Nearly two million viewed the episode, which received acclaim from critics.

==== Guest Directed Shorts ====
The second-season episode "Guest Directed Shorts" was aired in June 2015 and consists of three animated shorts. The first short, directed by M. Wartella, has Uncle Grandpa using time travel in order to find the best hamburger; the second, by Pendleton Ward, has Pizza Steve beatboxing with Uncle Grandpa in the park; and the third, by Max Winston, has the RV gang getting trapped in Uncle Grandpa's claymation mind after their television set breaks down. Wartella is known for his work on the animated series Superjail! and Mad, while Ward is the creator of Adventure Time; Winston is a professional stop-motion artist. The episode was viewed by 1.3 million. The episode was very well received by the critics, while Winston's short was nominated for best television production at the 2015 edition of the Annecy Film Festival.

==== Uncle Grandpa Babies ====
Uncle Grandpa Babies first appeared as a short in the 2014 episode "Grounded" as a faux Cartoon Network ad that presents a series called "Uncle Grandpa Babies" and claims to be made by the same creators of Adventure Time (Pendleton Ward) and Steven Universe (Rebecca Sugar). One year later, a full episode based on the babies saving America from a foreign country's missile launch aired on August 20, 2015.

In light of the special premiering, reruns of Baby Looney Tunes returned to Cartoon Network.

== Production ==
The Uncle Grandpa pilot was created by former Chowder storyboard artist Peter Browngardt, who first pitched the idea to Cartoon Network in 2006. Browngardt, who grew up the youngest in a large family of eight children (his eldest brother Tom would go on to work as the show's film editor), based the character upon the various and often eccentric relatives who would often drop by and visit them, as well as aspects of his own personality. The style of the show was inspired by his love of comics and Warner Bros. Cartoons. The pilot was produced in 2008, then aired online in 2009 on Cartoon Network Video as part of The Cartoonstitute. Akin to the Regular Show pilot, the Uncle Grandpa pilot was successful, but it too have been green-lit into its own series.

In 2011, the TV series Secret Mountain Fort Awesome (based on the creatures that appear in the original short) aired on Cartoon Network, but was not as well-received as the other Cartoon Network shows at the time, and was eventually put on hiatus in February 2012. Despite the failure, Secret Mountain Fort Awesome went on to win several awards, including the coveted Crystal Award for "Best Television Production" at Annecy International Animated Film Festival, the first United States–based production to do so. This helped boost Browngardt's profile in getting Uncle Grandpa greenlit as a series. Another factor that contributed to the launch of the show was the redesign of the character by John Kricfalusi, The Ren & Stimpy Show's creator.

On July 27 and 28, 2013, Cartoon Network aired a sneak peek of the series as part of Big Fan Weekend, along with Clarence and Steven Universe.

On August 17, 2022, it was announced that HBO Max would be removing several series, including Uncle Grandpa.

== International broadcast ==
In India, it aired in 2015 on Cartoon Network India and it airs still now on Cartoon Network HD+. In Canada, it premiered on September 2, 2013, on Teletoon. It also premiered on Cartoon Network channels in the United Kingdom and Ireland on April 14, 2014, and in Australia on May 5, 2014. In the Middle East, it premiered on July 6, 2014, on Cartoon Network Arabic.

== Home media ==
=== DVD releases ===
Region 1
DVD title	Season(s)	Aspect ratio	Episode count	Total running time	Release dates
Tiger Trails	1	16:9	12	132 minutes	December 16, 2014
Good Mornin'	1	16:9	12	132 minutes	April 7, 2015

== Accolades ==
Year	Award	Category	Nominee(s)	Result
2010	Primetime Emmy Awards	Outstanding Short-format Animated Program	Peter Browngardt, Janet Dimon, Robert Alvarez, Rob Renzetti, Craig McCracken, Brian A. Miller, Jennifer Pelphrey, and Rob Sorcher (for the "Uncle Grandpa" pilot from The Cartoonstitute)	Nominated
2014	Primetime Emmy Awards	Outstanding Individual in Animation	Nick Edwards (for episode "Afraid of the Dark")	Won
2015	Annecy International Animated Film Festival	TV series	Max Winston and Peter Browngardt (for "Total Reality" from Guest Directed Shorts)	Nominated
2016	Annie Awards	Voice Acting in an Animated TV/Broadcast Production	Kevin Michael Richardson (as Mr. Gus, for episode "Uncle Grandpa at the Movies")	Nominated

== Comics ==
On April 30, 2014, Kaboom! and Cartoon Network announced that Uncle Grandpa comics were in the works. Issue 1 was released on October 15, 2014.

== See also ==
- Secret Mountain Fort Awesome
- Grandpa Danger
