= Peter Browngardt =

American animator (born 1979)

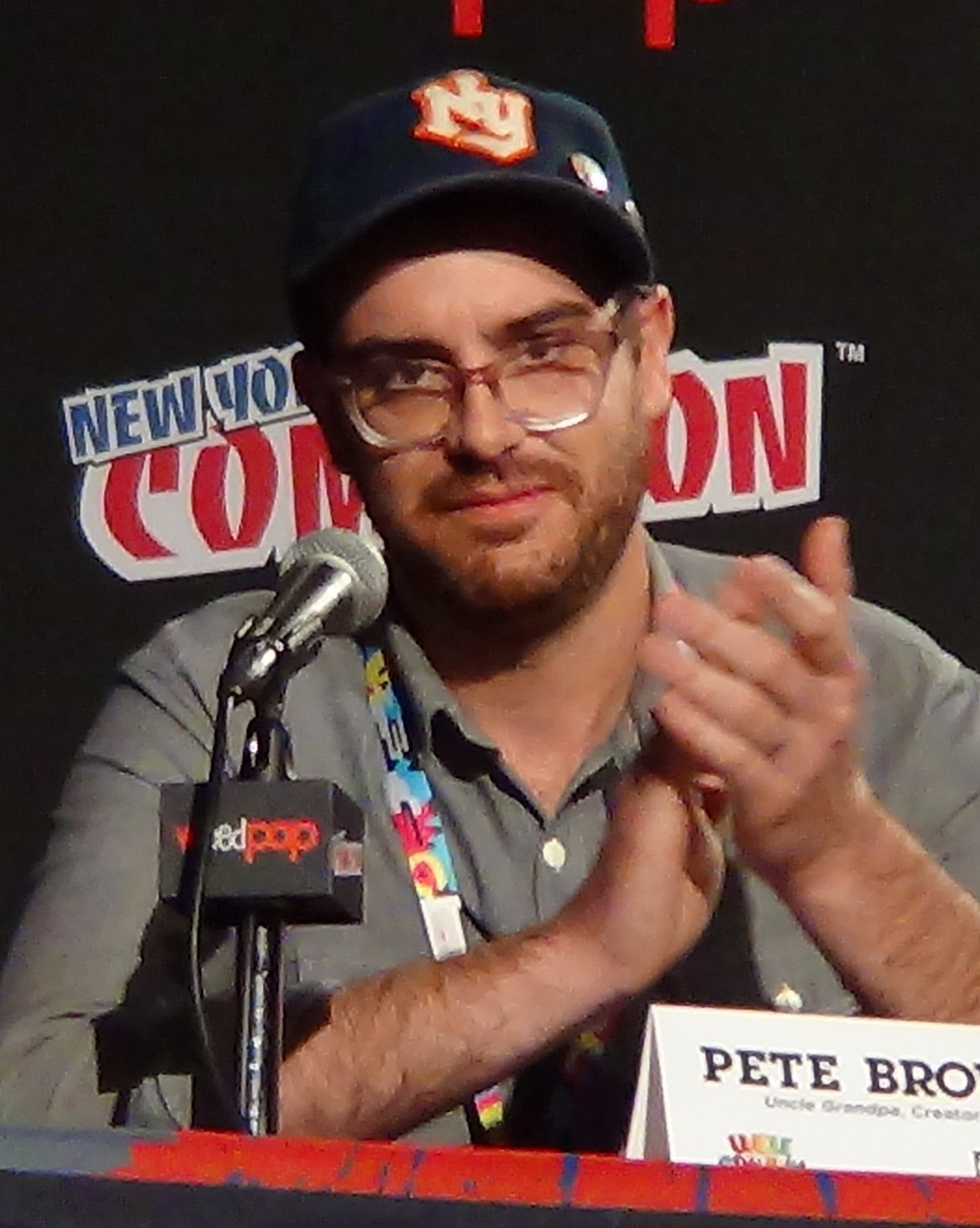
- Browngardt at the 2014 New York Comic Con
- Born: 1979 (age 46–47); Sag Harbor, New York, U.S.
- Education: California Institute of the Arts (BFA)
- Occupations: Animator, storyboard artist, writer, producer, voice actor
- Years active: 2000–present
- Notable work: Secret Mountain Fort Awesome; Uncle Grandpa; Looney Tunes Cartoons; Tom and Jerry Special Shorts

Peter Browngardt (born 1979) is an American animator, storyboard artist, writer, producer, and voice actor. He is the creator and lead voice actor of Cartoon Network's Uncle Grandpa, a spin-off of the studio's earlier series Secret Mountain Fort Awesome.

He worked as executive producer and the creative director for Looney Tunes Cartoons. Browngardt has had prior experience working on shows such as Futurama, The Venture Bros., Chowder, The Marvelous Misadventures of Flapjack, and Adventure Time.

Browngardt has cited Gary Larson, Don Martin, Harvey Kurtzman, Robert Crumb, Virgil Partch, John Kricfalusi, Chuck Jones, Max Fleischer, Bob Clampett, Tim Burton, and Tex Avery as major influences on his work.

== Biography ==
Peter Browngardt was born to Judy and Robert Browngardt and raised in Sag Harbor, New York, on Long Island. He graduated Pierson Middle-High School in 1997 and attended California Institute of the Arts. Browngardt started making animated films when he was 7. His older brothers made Super 8 horror films. He got his first job in animation working on Futurama. In 2021, Browngardt signed an overall deal with Warner Bros. Animation and Cartoon Network Studios which would allow him to develop and produce animated programming at both studios.

As a kid, he was fascinated by Garbage Pail Kids and Science fiction movies such as Invasion of the Body Snatchers, The Day the Earth Stood Still, and more.

Browngardt also directed the first fully-animated feature-length Looney Tunes film, The Day the Earth Blew Up, which was theatrically released in 2024.

In December 2024, Browngardt announced that he was part of an upcoming Pokémon project between Aardman Animations and The Pokemón Company for Disney XD and Disney+.In June 2026, the project was revealed to be Pokémon Tales: The Misadventures of Sirfetch'd & Pichu with Browgardt as Story Artist for the first season.

== Filmography ==
=== Film ===
| Year | Title | Director | Writer | Voice actor | Other | Role | Notes |
|---|---|---|---|---|---|---|---|
| 2003 | The Last American | No | No | No | Yes | Live actor (as Kev) | Producer |
| 2025 | The Day the Earth Blew Up | Yes | Yes | Yes | Yes | Voice actor (as Roofer Joe and Bully) | |
| 2026 | Coyote Vs. ACME | No | No | No | Yes | —N/a | Special Thanks |

=== Television ===
| Year | Project | Channel(s) | Credited role |
|---|---|---|---|
| 2000 | Futurama | Fox | Character layout artist ("Why Must I Be a Crustacean in Love?") |
| 2004 | Shorties Watchin' Shorties | Comedy Central | Animator |
| 2006 | The Venture Bros. | Adult Swim | Character designer and Prop designer |
| 2007–2010 | Chowder | Cartoon Network | Story/Storyboard artist (13 episodes), Storyboard revisionist, and Guest voice actor (as Crying Viewer) |
| 2008–2010 | The Marvelous Misadventures of Flapjack | Cartoon Network | Writer and Storyboard artist (2 episodes) |
| 2010–2012 | The Ricky Gervais Show | HBO | Storyboard artist (1 episode) |
| 2010, 2012 | Adventure Time | Cartoon Network | Writer/Storyboard artist (1 episode), and Guest voice actor (as Paper Pete) |
| 2011–2012 | Secret Mountain Fort Awesome | Cartoon Network | Creator, Executive producer, Story, Writer, Storyboard artist, and Voice actor (as Festro, Dingle, Additional Voices) |
| 2013–2017 | Uncle Grandpa | Cartoon Network | Creator, Executive producer, Story, Writer, Storyboard artist, Additional character designer, and Voice actor (as Uncle Grandpa, Additional Voices) |
| 2013 | Cartoon Network Shorts Department | Cartoon Network | Supervising producer, and Additional voice actor (only in Mars Safari!, as Atticus) |
| 2014, 2017 | Clarence | Cartoon Network | Supervising producer ("Pilot Expansion" only), and guest voice actor (as Ham the Power Guy, Someone) |
| 2015 | Steven Universe | Cartoon Network | Guest voice actor (as Uncle Grandpa) |
| 2016 | The Amazing World of Gumball | Cartoon Network | Guest voice actor (as Uncle Grandpa) |
| 2017, 2019, 2023 | SpongeBob SquarePants | Nickelodeon | Guest voice actor (as The Ice Cream King) |
| 2018 | OK K.O.! Let's Be Heroes | Cartoon Network | Guest voice actor (as Festro, Uncle Grandpa) |
| 2020–2024 | Looney Tunes Cartoons | HBO Max & Max | Creator, Developer, Executive producer, Director, Writer, and Voice actor (as Dumb Cat and Ox) |
| 2021 | Tom and Jerry Special Shorts | HBO Max | Creator, Developer, and Executive producer |
| 2026 | Cartoon Cartoons | YouTube | Executive producer (22 shorts overall) |
| 2027 | Pokémon Tales: The Misadventures of Sirfetch'd & Pichu | Disney XD; Disney+ | Story Artist |
