= Cartoon Brew =

News website dedicated to animation

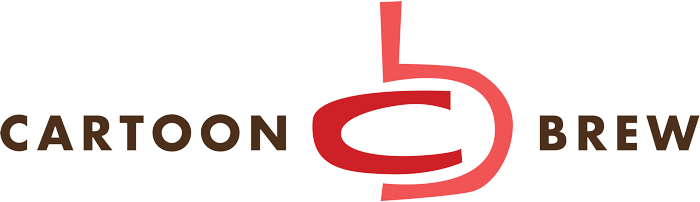
- Website type: News website
- Owners: Cartoon Brew, LLC.
- Editors: Amid Amidi (2004–2025); Jerry Beck (2004–2013); Jamie Lang (2025–present)
- Website: cartoonbrew.com
- Launched: 15 March 2004; 22 years ago
- Current status: Online

Cartoon Brew is an animation news website created by Amid Amidi and animation historian Jerry Beck that was launched on 15 March 2004.

== History ==
In 2025, Amid Amidi sold Cartoon Brew, LLC to Jamie Lang, who had previously been the site's editor-in-chef for two years. After acquisition, Lang returned to the editor-in-chef position, and also assumed the roles of owner and publisher of the company.

== Reception ==
The site has published news articles, commentaries and reviews regarding the animation industry. The Comics Beat called it the "essential cartoon blog", while animator Francis Glebas cited it as "the place to go for the latest in animation news".

== Cartoon Dump ==
Cartoon Brew also created Cartoon Dump, a weekly podcast showing poorly made TV cartoons featuring Mystery Science Theater 3000's Frank Conniff.

== Cartoon Research ==
Beck departed from the site in February 2013 and began writing for his first blog, Cartoon Research, instead.

== See also ==
- Animation World Network
- Animation Magazine
- History of animation
