= Amid Amidi =

Journalist and writer

Amid Amidi is a journalist. He was the co-founder, publisher and editor-in-chief of the website Cartoon Brew from 2004 until June 2025, when he sold the website and stepped down from these roles.

== See also ==
- My Little Pony: Friendship Is Magic fandom
