= Primetime Emmy Award for Outstanding Individual Achievement in Animation =

- Awarded for: Outstanding Individual Achievement in Animation
- Country: United States
- Presented by: Academy of Television Arts & Sciences
- First award: 1991
- Website: emmys.com

The Primetime Emmy Award for Outstanding Individual Achievement in Animation is an annual award given to recognize the best animators of the year. There are no nominees for this category, only winners chosen by a jury.

== Winners and nominations ==
=== 1990s ===
Year	Recipient	Program	Network
1991	Teresa Drilling, Jeff Mulcasater	Will Vinton's Claymation Comedy of Horrors	CBS
1992	John Ashlee Prat	Claymation Easter	CBS
1993	Natalia Demidova, Peter Kotor	Shakespeare: The Animated Tales	HBO
1993	Sergei Glagolev, Demitri Norosyolov	Shakespeare: The Animated Tales	HBO
1996	Natasha Dabizha	Shakespeare: The Animated Tales	HBO
1997	Phil Weinstein	Boo to You Too! Winnie the Pooh	CBS
1997	Gary Hurst	Testament: The Bible in Animation	HBO
1997	Loraine Marshall	The Willows in Winter	Family Channel
1998	Eric Radomski	Spawn	HBO
1999	Joanna Quinn	Animated Epics: The Canterbury Tales – Leaving London	HBO
1999	Ashley Potter	Animated Epics: The Canterbury Tales – Leaving London	HBO
1999	Les Mills	Animated Epics: The Canterbury Tales – Leaving London	HBO

=== 2000s ===
Year	Recipient	Program	Episode	Network
2000	Bari Kumar (color stylist)	Futurama	"A Bicyclops Built For Two"	Fox
2000	Nelson Lowry (art director)	The PJs	"How The Super Stoled Christmas"	Fox
2000	Don Shank (art director)	The Powerpuff Girls	"Twisted Sister/Cover Up"	Cartoon Network
2001	Rodney Clouden (storyboard artist)	Futurama	"Parasites Lost"	Fox
2001	Kyle Menke (storyboard artist)	Invader Zim	"The Nightmare Begins".	Nickelodeon
2001	Curt Underle (art director)	Gary & Mike	"Phish Phry"	UPN
2001	Brad Schiff (lead animator)	Gary & Mike	"Furry Duffel"	UPN
2002	Andrey Zolotukhin (production designer)	Animated Tales of the World	"John Henry, The Steel Driving Man"	HBO
2002	Maciek Albrecht (production designer/animator)	'Twas the Night		HBO
2003	Dan Krall (layout artist)	Samurai Jack	"Jack and the Spartans"	Cartoon Network
2003	Scott Wills (art director)	Samurai Jack	"Jack and the Traveling Creatures"	Cartoon Network
2003	Maciek Albrecht (animator)	Through a Child's Eyes: September 11, 2001		HBO
2004	Seonna Hong (background stylist)	My Life as a Teenage Robot	"The Wonderful World of Wizzley"	Nickelodeon
2005	Barbara Wierzchowska (animator)	Classical Baby		HBO
2005	Craig McCracken (character design)	Foster's Home for Imaginary Friends	"House of Bloos"	Cartoon Network
2005	Mike Moon (art director)	Foster's Home for Imaginary Friends	"House of Bloos"	Cartoon Network
2005	Ed Baker (storyboard artist)	Foster's Home for Imaginary Friends	"World Wide Wabbit"	Cartoon Network
2005	Bryan Andrews (storyboard artist)	Samurai Jack	"The Four Seasons of Death"	Cartoon Network
2005	Justin K. Thompson (background supervisor)	Star Wars: Clone Wars: Vol. 2	(Chapters 21–25)	Cartoon Network
2005	Frederick Gardner (background designer)	The Powerpuff Girls	"West In Pieces"	Cartoon Network
2005	Gordon Hammond (character designer)	The Fairly OddParents	"Shelf Life"	Nickelodeon
2006	Jarek Szyszko (animator)	Classical Baby 2		HBO
2006	Bryan Arnett (character designer)	Escape from Cluster Prime		Nickelodeon
2006	Shannon Tindle (character designer)	Foster's Home for Imaginary Friends	"Go Goo Go"	Cartoon Network
2006	Sarah E. Meyer (animator)	Robot Chicken	"Easter Basket"	Cartoon Network
2006	Mike Diederich (storyboard artist)	The Grim Adventures of Billy & Mandy		Cartoon Network
2006	Frederick Gardner (background key designer)	The Life and Times of Juniper Lee	"Adventures in Babysitting"	Cartoon Network
2007	Steven Fonti (storyboard artist)	Family Guy	"No Chris Left Behind"	Fox
2007	Sang-Jin Kim (animator)	Avatar: The Last Airbender	"Lake Laogai"	Nickelodeon
2007	James McDermott (character designer)	Eloise: The Animated Series	"Me, Eloise"	Starz
2007	Sue Mondt (art director)	Camp Lazlo	"Squirrel Secrets"	Cartoon Network
2007	David Colman (character designer)	Class of 3000	"Eddie's Money"	Cartoon Network
2007	Dave Dunnet (background key designer)	Foster's Home for Imaginary Friends	"Good Wilt Hunting"	Cartoon Network
2007	Phil Rynda (character designer)	Billy & Mandy's Big Boogey Adventure		Cartoon Network
2007	Sihanouk Mariona (animator)	Moral Orel	"The Lord's Prayer"	Cartoon Network
2007	Narnia Sokolova (background painter)	My Gym Partner's a Monkey	"Big Field Trip"	Cartoon Network
2007	Thomas R. Smith (animator)	Robot Chicken	"Lust for Puppets"	Cartoon Network
2008	Teresa Drilling (animator)	Creature Comforts	"Self Image, Winging It, Art"	CBS
2008	Ben Balistreri (character design)	Foster's Home for Imaginary Friends	"Mondo Coco"	Cartoon Network
2009	Shigemi Ikeda (art director)	Afro Samurai: Resurrection		Spike TV
2009	Joe Binggeli (background painter)	Chowder	"Shnitzel & The Lead Farfel"	Cartoon Network
2009	Elizabeth Harvatine (character animator)	Moral Orel	"Sacrifice"	Cartoon Network
2009	Joshua A. Jennings (character animator)	Robot Chicken	"Robot Chicken: Star Wars Episode II"	Cartoon Network
2009	Chris Roszak (background painter)	The Marvelous Misadventures of Flapjack	"Sea Legs"	Cartoon Network
2009	Andy Suriano (character designer)	Underfist: Halloween Bash		Cartoon Network

=== 2010s ===
Year	Recipient	Program	Episode	Network
2010	Andy Harkness (art director)	Prep & Landing		ABC
2010	William M. George III (background key design)	Prep & Landing		ABC
2010	Joe Mateo (storyboard artist)	Prep & Landing		ABC
2010	Greg Colton (storyboard artist)	Family Guy	"Road to the Multiverse"	Fox
2010	Nora Murphy-Berden (background painter)	Generator Rex	"The Day That Everything Changed"	Cartoon Network
2010	Chu-Hui Song (background painter)	Generator Rex	"The Day That Everything Changed"	Cartoon Network
2010	Chris Do (art director)	Heart of Stone		Vevo
2010	Andy Bialk (character design)	The Ricky Gervais Show	"Charity"	HBO
2010	Charles Ragins (background design)	The Simpsons	"Postcards from the Wedge"	Fox
2011	Drew Hodges (character animator)	Community: "Abed's Uncontrollable Christmas"		NBC
2011	Jill Daniels (background painter)	Phineas and Ferb	"Wizard of Odd"	Disney Channel
2011	Brian Woods (background design)	Phineas and Ferb	"Wizard of Odd"	Disney Channel
2011	Peter Chung (character design)	Firebreather		Cartoon Network
2011	Sung Chang (character animator)	Firebreather		Cartoon Network
2011	Philip Bourassa (character design)	Young Justice	"Independence Day"	Cartoon Network
2011	Vanessa Marzaroli (production design)	Lilac Wine		DrMartens.com
2012	Jill Daniels	Phineas and Ferb	"Doof Dynasty"	Disney Channel
2012	Bill Schwab	Prep & Landing: Naughty vs. Nice		ABC
2012	Chris Tsirgiotis	Secret Mountain Fort Awesome	"Nightmare Sauce"	Cartoon Network
2012	Robertryan Cory	Secret Mountain Fort Awesome	"Nightmare Sauce"	Cartoon Network
2013	Andy Ristaino	Adventure Time	"Puhoy"	Cartoon Network
2013	Andy Bialk	Dragons: Riders of Berk	"We Are Family (Part 2)"	Cartoon Network
2013	Joseph Holt	Mickey Mouse	"Croissant de Triomphe"	Disney Channel
2013	Jenny Gase-Baker	Mickey Mouse	"Croissant de Triomphe"	Disney Channel
2013	Alberto Mielgo	Tron: Uprising	"The Stranger"	Disney XD
2013	Paul Wee	The Simpsons	"Treehouse of Horror XXIII"	Fox
2014	Nick Jennings	Adventure Time	"Wizards Only, Fools"	Cartoon Network
2014	Jasmin Lai	The Powerpuff Girls: Dance Pantsed		Cartoon Network
2014	Nick Edwards	Uncle Grandpa	"Afraid of the Dark"	Cartoon Network
2014	Ian Worrel	Gravity Falls	"Dreamscaperers"	Disney Channel
2014	Narina Sokolova	Mickey Mouse	"‘O Sole Minnie"	Disney Channel
2014	Valerio Ventura	Mickey Mouse	"The Adorable Couple"	Disney Channel
2014	Sean Szeles	Long Live the Royals		CartoonNetwork.com
2014	Cameron Baity	Robot Chicken DC Comics Special 2: Villains in Paradise		Adult Swim
2014	Dmitry Malanitchev	The Simpsons	"Treehouse of Horror XXIV"	Fox
2014	Charles Ragins	The Simpsons	"Treehouse of Horror XXIV"	Fox
2015	Tom Herpich (storyboard artist)	Adventure Time	"Walnuts & Rain"	Cartoon Network
2015	Nick Cross (production design)	Over the Garden Wall		Cartoon Network
2015	Alonso Ramirez Ramos (storyboard artist)	Gravity Falls	"Not What He Seems"	Disney XD
2015	Nick Cross (background painter)	Tome of the Unknown		CartoonNetwork.com
2015	Chris Tsirgiotis (background layout designer)	Tome of the Unknown		CartoonNetwork.com
2015	J.J. Villard (character design)	King Star King	"Fat Frank's Fantasy Lounge"	Adult Swim
2015	Brad Schaffer (character animation)	Robot Chicken	"Robot Chicken's Bitch Pudding Special"	Adult Swim
2016	Jason Kolowski (production designer)	Adventure Time	"Bad Jubies"	Cartoon Network
2016	Tom Herpich (storyboard artist)	Adventure Time	"Stakes Pt. 8: The Dark Cloud"	Cartoon Network
2016	Chris Tsirgiotis (background designer)	Long Live the Royals	"Punk Show"	Cartoon Network
2016	Jason Carpenter (animation production designer)	He Named Me Malala		Nat Geo
2016	Scott DaRos (character animator)	Robot Chicken DC Comics Special III: Magical Friendship		Adult Swim
2017	Bryan Andrews (storyboard)	Samurai Jack	"XCIII"	Adult Swim
2017	Scott Wills (production design)	Samurai Jack	"XCIII"	Adult Swim
2017	Craig Kellman (character design)	Samurai Jack	"XCII"	Adult Swim
2017	Lou Romano (background design)	Samurai Jack	"XCV"	Adult Swim
2017	Justin Nichols (character animation)	Wander Over Yonder	"The End of the Galaxy"	Disney XD
2018	Lindsay Small-Butera (character animation)	Adventure Time	"Ketchup"	Cartoon Network
2018	Patrick Bryson (background painter)	Steven Universe	"Jungle Moon"	Cartoon Network
2018	Stu Livingston (storyboard artist)	Hey Arnold!: The Jungle Movie		Nickelodeon
2018	Jeff Scher (production designer)	The Number on Great-Grandpa's Arm		HBO
2018	Justin Martin	The Scariest Story Ever: A Mickey Mouse Halloween Spooktacular		Disney Channel
2018	Caroline Cruikshank (character animation)	The Simpsons	"Springfield Splendor"	Fox
2019	Céline Desrumaux (production designer)	Age of Sail		YouTube
2019	Bruno Mangyoku (character design)	Age of Sail		YouTube
2019	Jasmin Lai (color)	Age of Sail		YouTube
2019	Elaine Lee (background painter)	Carmen Sandiego	"The Chasing Paper Caper"	Netflix
2019	Alberto Mielgo (production designer)	Love, Death & Robots	"The Witness"	Netflix
2019	David Pate (character animator)	Love, Death & Robots	"The Witness"	Netflix
2019	Jun-ho Kim (background designer)	Love, Death & Robots	"Good Hunting"	Netflix
2019	Owen Sullivan (storyboard artist)	Love, Death & Robots	"Sucker of Souls"	Netflix

=== 2020s ===
Year	Recipient	Program	Episode	Network
2020 (72nd)	Jill Dykxhoorn (lead background artist)	Archer	"Road Trip"	FXX
2020 (72nd)	Dan MacKenzie (character animator)	Cosmos: Possible Worlds	"Vavilov"	Nat Geo
2020 (72nd)	Genndy Tartakovsky (storyboard artist)	Genndy Tartakovsky's Primal	"Spear and Fang"	Adult Swim
2020 (72nd)	Scott Wills (art director)	Genndy Tartakovsky's Primal	"Spear and Fang"	Adult Swim
2020 (72nd)	Stephen DeStefano (character designer)	Genndy Tartakovsky's Primal	"A Cold Death"	Adult Swim
2021 (73rd)	David Krentz (storyboard artist)	Genndy Tartakovsky's Primal	"Plague of Madness"	Adult Swim
2021 (73rd)	Robert Valley (production designer)	Love, Death & Robots	"Ice"	Netflix
2021 (73rd)	Patricio Betteo (background artist)	Love, Death & Robots	"Ice"	Netflix
2021 (73rd)	Dan Gill (stop motion animator)	Love, Death & Robots	"All Through the House"	Netflix
2021 (73rd)	Laurent Nicolas (character designer)	Love, Death & Robots	"Automated Customer Service"	Netflix
2021 (73rd)	Nik Ranieri (lead character layout artist)	The Simpsons	"Wad Goals"	Fox
2022 (74th)	Anne-Laure To (color script artist)	Arcane	"The Boy Savior"	Netflix
2022 (74th)	Julien Georgel (art direction)	Arcane	"Happy Progress Day!"	Netflix
2022 (74th)	Bruno Couchinho (background designer)	Arcane	"When These Walls Come Tumbling Down"	Netflix
2022 (74th)	Lexy Naut (storyboard artist)	The Boys Presents: Diabolical	"Boyd in 3D"	Prime Video
2022 (74th)	Kecy Salangad (animator)	The House		Netflix
2022 (74th)	Alberto Mielgo (character designer)	Love, Death & Robots	"Jibaro"	Netflix
2023 (75th)	Meybis Ruiz Cruz (lead character designer)	Entergalactic		Netflix
2023 (75th)	Maya Edelman (animation director)	More Than I Want to Remember		Paramount+
2023 (75th)	Nik Ranieri (character layout)	The Simpsons	"Lisa the Boy Scout"	Fox
2023 (75th)	Almu Redondo (art director)	Star Wars: Visions	"Screecher's Reach"	Disney+
2024 (76th)	Alex Small-Butera (SmallBu) (animator)	Adventure Time: Fionna and Cake	"The Winter King"	Max
2024 (76th)	Toby Wilson (production designer)	Blue Eye Samurai	"The Great Fire of 1657"	Netflix
2024 (76th)	Ryan O'Loughlin (storyboard artist)	Blue Eye Samurai	"Hammerscale"	Netflix
2024 (76th)	Brian Kesinger (lead character designer)	Blue Eye Samurai	"Nothing Broken"	Netflix
2024 (76th)	Tara Billinger (character designer)	Clone High	"Let's Try This Again"	Max
2024 (76th)	Jan Maas (lead animator)	In the Know	"Yogurt Week"	Peacock
2024 (76th)	Noémie Leroux (background designer)	Scavengers Reign	"The Dream"	Max
2025 (77th)	Bruno Couchinho (background designer)	Arcane	"The Dirt Under Your Nails"	Netflix
2025 (77th)	Faustine Dumontier (colorscript and color keys artist)	Arcane	"The Message Hidden Within the Pattern"	Netflix
2025 (77th)	Daryl Graham (2D animation supervisor)	Love, Death & Robots	"400 Boys"	Netflix
2025 (77th)	Robert Valley (character design)	Love, Death & Robots	"400 Boys"	Netflix
2025 (77th)	Gigi Cavenago (art director)	Love, Death & Robots	"How Zeke Got Religion"	Netflix
2025 (77th)	Edgar Martins (storyboard artist)	Love, Death & Robots	"How Zeke Got Religion"	Netflix
2026 (78th)	Uzoma Dunkwu (character design)	Eyes of Wakanda	"Into the Lion's Den"	Disney+
2026 (78th)	David Krentz (storyboard artist)	Genndy Tartakovsky's Primal	"Kingdom of Sorrow"	Adult Swim
2026 (78th)	Scott Wills (art director)	Genndy Tartakovsky's Primal	"Vengeance of Death"	Adult Swim
2026 (78th)	Howard Chen (background design)	The Mighty Nein	"Mote of Possibility"	Prime Video
2026 (78th)	Takashi Okazaki (character design)	Star Wars: Visions	"The Duel: Payback"	Disney+

== Programs with multiple awards ==
13 awards

- Love, Death & Robots (Netflix)

7 awards

- Adventure Time (Cartoon Network / HBO Max)
- Samurai Jack (Cartoon Network/Adult Swim)
- The Simpsons (Fox)

6 awards

- Genndy Tartakovsky's Primal (Adult Swim)

5 awards

- Foster's Home for Imaginary Friends (Cartoon Network)
- Mickey Mouse (Disney Channel)
- Robot Chicken (Adult Swim)

4 awards

- Arcane (Netflix)
- Prep & Landing (ABC)

3 awards

- Age of Sail (YouTube)
- Animated Epics: The Canterbury Tales – Leaving London (HBO)
- Blue Eye Samurai (Netflix)
- Phineas and Ferb (Disney Channel)
- Shakespeare: The Animated Tales (HBO)

2 awards

- Classical Baby (HBO)
- Family Guy (Fox)
- Firebreather (Cartoon Network)
- Futurama (Fox)
- Gary & Mike (UPN)
- Generator Rex (Cartoon Network)
- Gravity Falls (Disney XD)
- Long Live the Royals (Cartoon Network)
- The Powerpuff Girls (Cartoon Network)
- Secret Mountain Fort Awesome (Cartoon Network)
- Star Wars: Visions (Disney+)
- Tome of the Unknown (CartoonNetwork.com)

== See also ==
- List of animation awards
- Academy Award for Best Animated Short Film
