= The Unknown (Over the Garden Wall) =

- Over the Garden Wall episode
- Title Card
- Episode no.: Episode 10
- Directed by: Nick Cross (art); Robert Alvarez, Larry Leichliter, Eddy Houchins, and Ken Bruce (animation); Nate Cash (supervising)
- Written by: Natasha Allegri; Jim Campbell; Tom Herpich
- Story by: Amalia Levari: Tom Herpich; Patrick McHale
- Original air date: November 7, 2014

Episode chronology
← Previous "Into the Unknown"	Next → —

"The Unknown" is the final episode of the American animated television miniseries Over the Garden Wall. It first aired on Cartoon Network on November 7, 2014. The episode's story was supervised by Amalia Levari, Tom Herpich, and series creator Patrick McHale, while writing and storyboarding were managed by Herpich, Jim Campbell, and Natasha Allegri.

== Plot ==
The bluebird Beatrice navigates through a snowstorm in search of Wirt, and comes across Greg, who is performing meaningless tasks at the request of the Beast. Upon finding Wirt, Beatrice begins to lead him to where she saw Greg. Meanwhile, the Woodsman journeys into the forest as the sun sets, in search of Edelwood. He finds Greg, who is in the process of being turned into an Edelwood tree by the Beast. He attempts to help Greg and to drive the Beast away as Wirt and Beatrice arrive.

Having defeated the Woodsman, the Beast offers to Wirt to keep Greg's soul alive within his lantern, as long as Wirt takes on the Woodsman's task of keeping the lantern alight. Wirt however realizes aloud that the Beast's soul is inside the lantern and refuses the offer. He frees Greg and gives Adelaide's magical scissors to Beatrice, which will cure Beatrice and her family of the curse that transformed them into bluebirds. As they depart, the Woodsman, who had been told by the Beast that he was keeping his daughter alive by keeping the lantern alight, ignores the Beast's continuous lies and extinguishes the lantern, killing the Beast.

After Wirt and Beatrice exchange goodbyes, Wirt awakens underwater in a lake in his hometown. He pulls Greg up to the surface with him, where the police and his friends await. After being taken to a hospital, Wirt regains consciousness and finds that his friends and Sara are present. Sara explains to Wirt that she has not listened to the cassette tape he made for her, as she does not own a cassette tape player. Wirt offers to listen to it with her later.

Greg details his adventures in the Unknown to those around him, and shakes his pet frog, who glows, indicating that Auntie Whispers' magical bell is still inside him and that the Unknown was not entirely imaginary. In the Unknown, the melancholic Woodsman sits on his porch, and is happily surprised when his daughter is in the house, still alive. The other inhabitants of the Unknown appear to be living pleasant lives, and Beatrice and her family are shown restored to their original human forms. As Greg's frog plays a piano and sings, Greg returns the stolen rock facts rock to Mrs. Daniels' garden.

== Production ==
The show, created by Patrick McHale, is based on the 2013 animated short film Tome of the Unknown, which McHale wrote and directed for Cartoon Network Studios as part of their shorts development program. The final episode features Elijah Wood as Wirt, Collin Dean as Greg, Melanie Lynskey as Beatrice, Christopher Lloyd as the Woodsman, and Samuel Ramey as the Beast.

== Critical reception ==
The series as a whole, including the finale, received critical acclaim. The episode has been analyzed for its allusions to fear and choice, with journalist Vrai Kaiser noting that the decision made by Wirt and the Woodsman to no longer light the Beast's lantern represents the discovery of "a truth that can not only shape the future but inform the past".
