= Chris Tsirgiotis =

American animator

- Known for: Animation

Chris Tsirgiotis is an American animator, most known for his background art pieces. He has won two Emmy Awards for Outstanding Individual Achievement: once in 2012 for his work on Secret Mountain Fort Awesome, and one in 2015 for his work on Tome of the Unknown (the pilot episode to the critically lauded animated miniseries Over the Garden Wall).

== Accolades ==
Tsirgiotis received the Primetime Emmy Award for Outstanding Individual Achievement in Animation in 2012, 2015, and 2016; Tsirgiotis also won an Emmy of the same name at the inaugural Children's and Family Emmy Awards ceremony held in 2022.

== Filmography ==
Year	Title	Role
1997-99	Jumanji	Background designer (22 episodes)
1999–2000	Dilbert	Background design supervisor (29 episodes)
2001–03	The Mummy	Background designer (23 episodes)
2002	Eight Crazy Nights	Layout design supervisor
2003–04	He-Man and the Masters of the Universe	Layout designer (13 episodes)
2004–05	My Life as a Teenage Robot	Background designer (4 episodes)
2004	Kangaroo Jack: G'Day U.S.A.!	Background key design
2006–07	Camp Lazlo	Background designer (12 episodes)
2007	Project Gilroy	Background designer
2008	The Powerpuff Girls Rule!!!	Background designer
2008, 2011	The Mighty B!	Additional layout designer (4 episodes), layout designer (1 episode)
2008–10	The Marvelous Misadventures of Flapjack	Background designer (45 episodes)
2010–13	Scooby-Doo! Mystery Incorporated	Background designer (32 episodes), background supervisor (4 episodes)
2011–15	Adventure Time	Background designer
2011	Tom and Jerry and the Wizard of Oz	Background designer
2011	Secret Mountain Fort Awesome	Background designer (5 episodes)
2012	The Legend of Korra	Background designer (5 episodes)
2013	Sanjay and Craig	Background designer (1 episode), clean-up artist (1 episode)
2013	My Science Fiction Project	Background designer
2013	Steven Universe	Background designer (Pilot only)
2013–15	Wander Over Yonder	Background designer (9 episodes), location designer (3 episodes)
2013	Tome of the Unknown	Background designer
2014, 2015	Long Live the Royals	Background designer (Pilot & mini-series)
2014–15	Mickey Mouse	Location designer (4 episodes)
2014	Over the Garden Wall	Background designer
2015	Star vs. the Forces of Evil	Location designer (1 episode)
2015	Ridin' with Burgess	Background designer
2016	Lazybones	Background layout designer
2017	The Fancies	Background designer
2017	Tiggle Winks	Background designer
