= The Woodsman =

The Woodsman may refer to:

- The Woodsman (film), the 2004 film
- The Woodsman (play), the 2012 play
- The Woodsman (character), an Over the Garden Wall character
