= House Shark =

- Promotional release poster
- Directed by: Ron Bonk
- Written by: Ron Bonk
- Produced by: Howard Gromero; Jonathan Straiton; Tim Ritter
- Starring: Trey Harrison; Wes Reid; Michael Merchant
- Music by: Emmett Van Slyke
- Production company: SRS Cinema
- Release date: October 21, 2017 (Nightmares Film Festival)
- Running time: 112 minutes
- Country: United States
- Language: English

House Shark is a 2017 American horror comedy film written and directed by Ron Bonk. The film stars Trey Harrison as Frank, a former cop who finds that a dangerous but largely unknown breed of shark has invaded his home, and enlists the help of a former real estate agent named Abraham and a "house shark" expert named Zachary to confront the threat.

== Cast ==
- Trey Harrison as Frank
- Wes Reid as Abraham
- Michael Merchant as Zachary
- Collin Dean as Kid
- Aiden Tetro as Kid
- Nathan Bonk as Theo
- Jennie Russo as Eleanor
- Samantha Varga as Betsy
- Brett Janeski as George
- Melissa LaMartina as Lady Bird
- Mary Snell as Secretary
- Nathan Hine as Bodyguard
- Edward Mastin as Ronald
- John Krenrich as Ulysses
- Sarah Noelle as Nancy
- Stacy M. Underwood as Dolly
- David Royal as John
- Wayne W. Johnson as Darth Squanto
- Cameron Spagnola as Kid on Bike 2

== Production ==
Writer and director Ron Bonk stated that the film was conceived as a result of both a desire to make "a shark movie" and an incident in which Bonk experienced ice cracking on the roof of his home. In an interview with PopMatters, he said "It was unseasonably cold even for mid-winter in Central NY, and I made a joke about it being zombies on my roof. And that was the movie title, Zombies on an Ice Roof, or something along those lines. Then I thought what if it was a zombie apocalypse but only inside people's homes... then thinking I didn’t want to do zombies, I thought what if it was a shark?"

During pre-production for House Shark, Bonk launched a campaign on the crowdfunding website Indiegogo to alleviate production costs, but the campaign failed to reach the desired funding goal. As a result, both the equipment used for the film and the size of the crew were limited.

The special effects in House Shark were created by Marcus Koch and Matthew Ash. Over the course of about three weeks, Koch constructed a 14-foot shark costume out of foam latex. Several people performed as suit actors inside the shark costume, including Koch and Michael Merchant, the latter of whom also played the character Zachary in the film. In an interview with The Hollywood Reporter, Bonk disclosed that the costume has since been disassembled.

House Shark has been described by Bonk himself as "Jaws in a house", and one of the official posters for the film features the tagline "You're gonna need a bigger house", a reference to a line of dialogue from Jaws. Bonk has stated that "It's hard to do a shark movie without paying homage to Jaws". He has also referred to House Shark as being the "Blazing Saddles of shark movies" due to absurd elements present in the film.

== Release and reception ==
House Shark premiered at the Nightmares Film Festival in Columbus, Ohio on October 21, 2017, where it won the award for "Best Horror Comedy". In early 2018, Bonk launched an Indiegogo campaign in order to distribute the film on Blu-ray, DVD, and VHS. Unlike the campaign that was launched prior to the film's production, which failed to reach its funding goal, this second campaign hit its initial goal within 17 hours of its creation.

Brad Miska of Bloody Disgusting described the film as "a bit Jaws and a bit Goonies and a whole lot of Troma-like madness." Kyle Brunet of Boston Hassle wrote that "I could not recommend House Shark enough ... thinking back about House Shark with a shit-eating grin on my face, I keep trying to think about the last time I've had this much fun watching a movie."

== See also ==
- Ghost Shark
- Sand Sharks
- Snow Shark
- Roboshark (film)
