= Narina Sokolova =

American animation artist

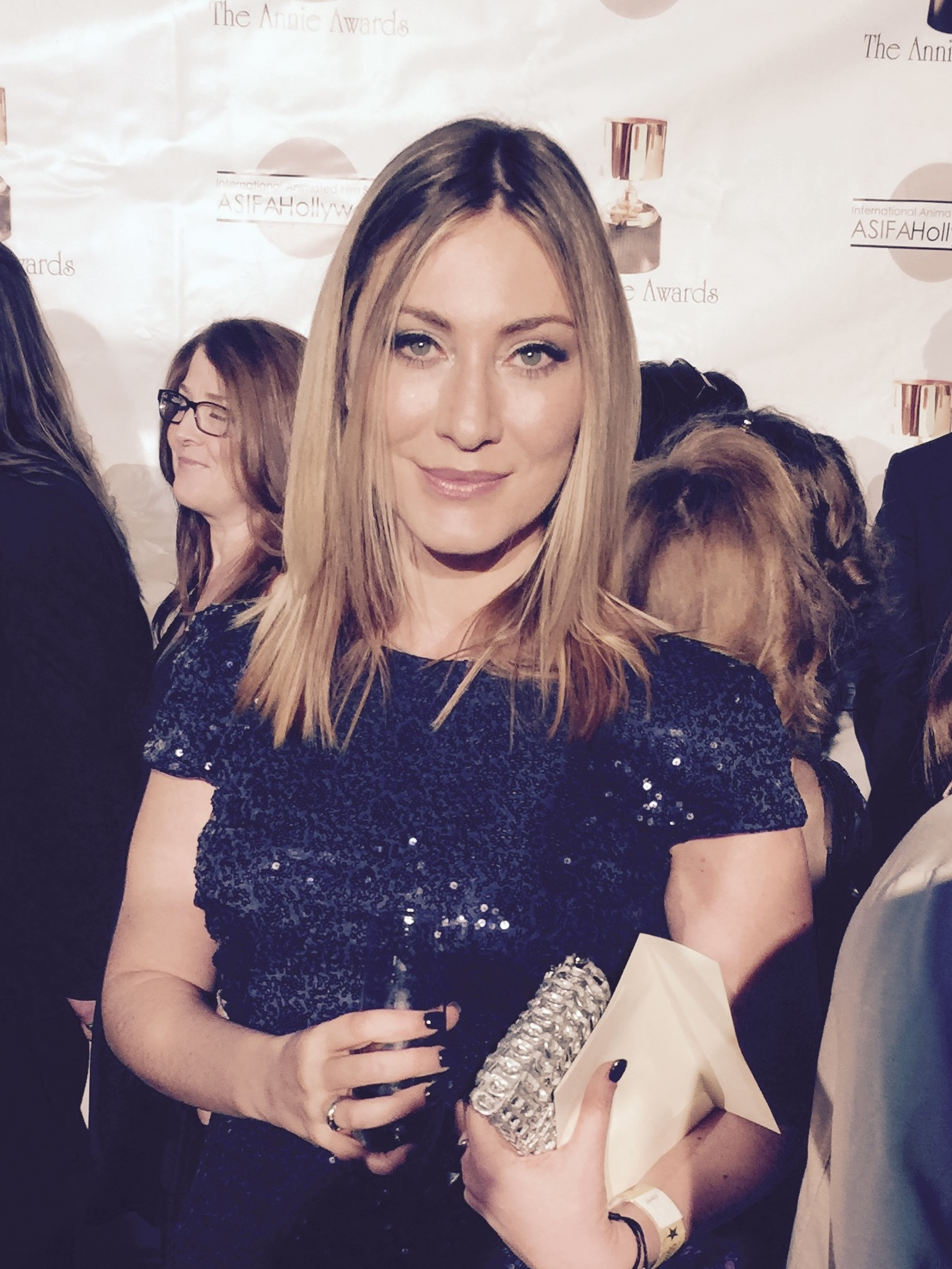
- Known for: Animation

Narina Sokolova is a Russian born American animation artist. She has won two Primetime Emmy Award for Outstanding Individual Achievement in Animation, and won Annie Award for Outstanding Individual Achievement in Animation. She is a member of The Animation Guild, I.A.T.S.E. Local 839.

== Selected filmography ==
Year	Title	Contribution
2021-2022	Minnie's Bow-Toons	Art director
2021	Scooby-Doo! The Sword and the Scoob	Background painter
2019-2020	Looney Tunes Cartoons	Background painter
2017-2018	Dorothy and the Wizard of Oz	Production artist
2014-2016	Bunnicula	Lead background painter
2016	Star vs. the Forces of Evil	Background painter
2011-2014	Mickey Mouse	Background painter
2010-2011	The Looney Tunes Show	Lead background painter
2010	Tom and Jerry Meet Sherlock Holmes	Background painter
2009-2010	The Twisted Whiskers Show	Production artist
2006	The Buzz on Maggie	Production designer
2004-2005	ToddWorld	Production designer
2003	Kid Notorious	Production designer
1999-2003	Rugrats	Set designer
2000-2002	Rocket Power	Background designer
1997	Johnny Bravo	Color background

== Awards and nominations ==
Year	Result	Award	Category	Work	Ref.
2015	Won	Annie Awards	Outstanding Achievement for Production Design in an Animated Television	Mickey Shorts	
2014	Won	Primetime Emmy Awards	Outstanding Individual Achievement in Animation	Mickey Mouse: "‘O Sole Minnie"	
2007	Won	Primetime Emmy Awards	Outstanding Individual Achievement in Animation	My Gym Partner's a Monkey: "‘Big Field Trip"	
