= List of Over the Garden Wall characters =

Greg (left) and Wirt, two half-brothers, along with Beatrice the bluebird and Greg's pet frog

The American animated television miniseries Over the Garden Wall features a cast of fictional characters created by Patrick McHale. The series revolves around two half-brothers: Wirt (voiced by Elijah Wood), the awkward and pessimistic older brother, and Gregory (voiced by Collin Dean), the energetic and optimistic younger brother. The duo travel through a strange forest, searching for the way back to their home and encountering wondrous things along their journey. On their quest, Wirt and Greg interact with characters such as a bluebird named Beatrice (voiced by Melanie Lynskey), the Woodsman (voiced by Christopher Lloyd), and the Beast (voiced by Samuel Ramey).

== Main ==
- Wirt (voiced by Elijah Wood) is the older half-brother of Gregory. He often holds a determined and serious perspective on situations. He wears a red pointed hat made from a Santa hat, a navy blue nurses' cape with yellow buttons, a pair of grey pants, a white shirt, and thin suspenders. He wears shoes with mismatched colors, with one shoe being black and the other being brown. His clothes are revealed to be a Halloween costume—although even Wirt, who assembled the costume himself, is at a loss when it comes to explaining what the costume is specifically supposed to be. He is an easily frightened pessimist, and can become quickly annoyed with Greg, despite deeply caring for him. He has a crush on a girl named Sara and often writes and recites poetry; he can also play the clarinet.
- Greg (voiced by Collin Dean) is the younger half-brother of Wirt. He is energetic and imaginative, acting as a sort of optimistic antithesis to Wirt. He is short and plump, wearing a pair of faded green overalls, matching black shoes and a brown satchel over a white shirt with a ribbon. Unlike Wirt, he is often unconcerned in the face of danger; for example, he gleefully follows the instructions of the Beast, unknowingly defying the Beast's intentions to exhaust his strength. He wears a tea kettle on his head so as to resemble an elephant for Halloween.
- Beatrice (voiced by Melanie Lynskey in the miniseries, Natasha Leggero in the short film pilot) is a talking bluebird that follows Wirt and Greg on their journey after they help her become untangled from a rose bush. She was a human girl who threw a rock at a bluebird, and both she and her family were transformed into bluebirds for her misdeed. She formed an agreement with an old lady named Adelaide to find her a child servant, wherein she would receive a pair of magical scissors that would remove the family's curse if used to trim their wings.

== Recurring ==
The Woodsman, voiced by Christopher Lloyd

- The Woodsman (voiced by Christopher Lloyd) is a former municipal judge who moved to a house in the country with his wife and daughter, as others with him in the city. He wears a stove pipe hat, dark-coloured clothing, and black boots. He is often seen carrying the Beast's Dark Lantern, an axe, or, strapped to his back, a large bundle of wood. His wife was fatally wounded by an unidentified creature, and the Beast tricked him into thinking he placed the soul of the Woodsman's daughter in his Dark Lantern, promising that his daughter's soul would live on as long as the flame within the lantern was alight. This forced the Woodsman to begin chopping down Edelwood trees in order to keep the lantern's fire burning.
- Gregory's pet frog (voiced by Jack Jones) is a frog found by Greg shortly before he and Wirt crossed into the forest of the Unknown. Greg has given the frog many names, including "Kitty", "Wirt", "George Washington", "Benjamin Franklin", “Dr. Cucumber”, and “Greg Jr.” until ultimately deciding on "Jason Funderburker". The frog comes along with Wirt and Greg on their search for the way back home through the forest, and has the ability to speak English and to sing.

The Beast, voiced by Samuel Ramey

- The Beast (voiced by Samuel Ramey) is a mysterious, sinister and demonic creature and the main antagonist of the miniseries. Almost always depicted in the form of a silhouette, he is well-spoken and manipulative, and has the power to possess other creatures. He has a humanoid shape and a pair of antlers. His eyes glow a faded white colour, yet can have red pupils and yellow-light blue sclera. The Beast forces the Woodsman to carry and fuel his Dark Lantern, which contains the Beast's soul, under the guise that it contains the soul of the Woodsman's daughter. Throughout the miniseries, the Beast follows Wirt and Greg, trying to turn them into Edelwood trees to fuel his lantern. When the light of the lantern is shined upon the Beast in the final episode of the miniseries, he is revealed to be a horrific tree-like monster composed of various grotesque faces, likely from the souls of those he has turned into Edelwood trees. The Beast is killed when the Woodsman extinguishes the flame within the lantern.
- Adelaide of the Pasture (voiced by John Cleese) is an old woman, the sister of Auntie Whispers and the secondary antagonist of the miniseries. She promises Beatrice that she will give her magical scissors to undo the curse placed upon Beatrice's family. She traps Wirt and Greg and attempts to turn them into her servants, but is killed when Beatrice opens a window in her house, causing the night air (which is poisonous to her) to melt her.

== Other ==
- Sara (voiced by Emily Brundige) is the love interest of Wirt. She is the mascot, a bumblebee, of the high school that she and Wirt attend. As she is only depicted in the show around Halloween, she is seen wearing a flight jacket and a clown outfit, and her face is painted like a skull. Wirt makes a cassette tape for her which contains his poems and musical compositions, although she later tells him that she does not own a cassette tape player. Jason Funderberker also has feelings for her, and though Sara is uninterested in Jason, Wirt nonetheless sees him as a threat.
- Jason Funderberker (voiced by Cole Sanchez) is Wirt's supposed competition for the affection of Sara. He has light brown hair and extremely small eyes compared to the other characters and a meek nature. Gregory names his pet frog after him, though, unlike the name of the real Jason, which is spelled with an "e" in his last name, he spells the frog's name with a "u".
- Lorna (voiced by Shannyn Sossamon) is a young, pale girl who was possessed by an evil spirit. She wears a white bonnet, a dark aqua blouse, and a white apron, and speaks with an English accent. Her guardian is Auntie Whispers, who controls the evil spirit that possesses Lorna by using a golden bell, making her perform chores and tasks to distract the spirit from making her wicked. Wirt later uses the bell to exorcise the spirit from her.
- Auntie Whispers (voiced by Tim Curry) is Lorna's guardian. She carries a golden bell that can control the evil spirit that possesses Lorna. She is the sister of Adelaide of the Pasture, and has a very large head and eyes. Unlike her sister, she is caring and compassionate, truly loving Lorna. She often eats black turtles.
- Fred (voiced by Fred Stoller) is a talking horse, who is stolen by the protagonists, only to reveal he can talk after the fact and is okay with this. When they attempt to steal from the rich Quincy Endicott, Fred reveals he is obsessed with stealing, but later regrets it when he believes Endicott is going to kill him. When they realize Endicott is not dangerous, Fred opts to stay with him and make an honest living as a tea delivery horse. In the comic, it is revealed that Fred was the horse of the Highwayman.
- Quincy Endicott (voiced by John Cleese) is the wealthy and extravagant owner of a company, Quincy Endicott's Health Tea. He gains money from his tea business, inhabiting a mansion and raising peacocks. He becomes obsessed with a supposed ghost whom he finds in an unknown section of his large mansion, causing him to question his sanity. He later learns that she is actually his business competitor and neighbour, Margueritte Grey (voiced by Bebe Neuwirth), who in turn believed that Endicott was a ghost. The two fall in love and continue to live in their Georgian-Baroque-style mansion. By the end of the series, it is unknown as to whether or not Endicott is alive; however, in the flashback episode, the gravestone that Greg hides behind in the graveyard has Endicott's name on it.
- Miss Langtree (voiced by Janet Klein) is a school teacher for a school for animals owned by her father, Mr. Langtree (voiced by Sam Marin). Her love interest is a man named Jimmy Brown (voiced by Thomas Lennon). She can play the piano.

=== Cloud City residents ===
In the eighth episode of the miniseries, Greg has a dream when asleep with Wirt under a tree, dreaming of himself in a fictional location called Cloud City. The city has various committees, including the Cloud City Reception Committee (voiced by Judah Nelson); the Cloud City Auxiliary Reception Committee; a trio of animals known as Hippopotamus, Giraffe, and Monkey; and an unpleasant-looking dog with a rain cloud over its head known as the Fourth Reception Committee. The city is filled with angels and various cartoon animals, including elephants, dogs, and rabbits.

The Queen of the Clouds (voiced by Deborah Voigt) is the ruler of Cloud City, opposed by the havoc-stirring North Wind (voiced by Mark Bodnar).
