= The Number on Great-Grandpa's Arm =

2018 short documentary film

The Number on Great-Grandpa's Arm is a short 2018 HBO documentary about the Holocaust.

== Summary ==
It is intended to be a gentle introduction to the subject suitable for children, featuring a conversation between a 10-year-old boy, Elliott, and his 90-year-old great-grandfather, Jack, a survivor of Auschwitz from World War II. The exchange is woven with historical footage and hand-painted animation to tell a story of Jewish life in Eastern Europe before and during the Holocaust.

== Production ==
The Number on Great-Grandpa’s Arm was directed and produced by Emmy award winner Amy Schatz. The animation was done by Jeff Scher, who won a Primetime Emmy Award for Outstanding Individual Achievement in Animation for his work in 2018.
