= Jim Campbell (illustrator) =

American comics artist (born 1977)

Jim Campbell (born 1977), also known by his pseudonym "Angry Jim", is an American storyboard artist, comic artist, and musician living in Brooklyn, New York.

== Biography ==
=== Early life and illustration work ===
While studying at the Kansas City Art Institute, he founded the band Ottomen with fellow Illustration students David (Misung) Stevenson and George Garcia. In 2000, he moved to New York, and in 2001, he joined Meathaus, a comics art collective and the publisher of the Meathaus Anthologies. In 2004, he released his comic book series Krachmacher and began singing and playing guitar in a new band, Paper Fleet, with Joshua Inman (drummer, songwriter). The two soon added Jim's high school friend John TerLouw on bass. Jim's other work includes freelance illustration and coloring work for Tony Millionaire.

Campbell has also storyboarded for a multitude of shows including Adventure Time, Over The Garden Wall, Summer Camp Island, & the Drinky Crow Show, along with illustrating comics for Over The Garden Wall as well as writing and illustrating his own comic 'At the Shore'
