= Jeff Scher =

American filmmaker (born 1954)

Jeff Scher (born December 24, 1954) is an American filmmaker, animator and painter.

== Biography ==
Jeffery Noyes Scher was born on December 24, 1954. Scher graduated from Bard College in 1976. He is married to Bonnie Siegler and they currently live in Westport, CT with their two children Buster and Oscar. His work is in the permanent collections of the Museum of Modern Art, Academy Film Archives, Hirshhorn Museum, Pompidou Centre, Musee d’Art Moderne, Vienna Kunsthalle and Austrian National Archive. To supplement his income, Scher creates and directs commercials for HBO, HBO Family, PBS, Nickelodeon, Nick Jr. Channel, Ameritek, International Film Festival and the Sundance Channel. He also teaches graduate courses and at the School of Visual Arts and plans to begin as an instructor at NYU Tisch School of the Arts Kanbar Institute of Film & Television’s Animation program in the fall of 2008. In 2001 Scher received the Creative Capital Award in the discipline of Moving Image.

He also won a Creative Arts Emmy Award for his production design on the HBO documentary The Number on Great-Grandpa's Arm.

== Film Methodology ==
As an underground filmmaker, Scher uses lights, abstractions and visual effects all paired with music to create experimental short films. His films have been described as animated still life as they are made from various drawings in which the images change to trigger responses within the human mind. He uses his paintings and collages by overlapping the colors and textures to seem as if they are in fact “moving” in a hypnotic fashion. Images of influential behaviorists, Hermann Rorschach and Ivan Pavlov, appear in some of his films. The films are highly irrational in their juxtapositions, but this is the intention of the filmmaker. Scher wants his viewers to create their own stories from the visuals he provides. Films such as All the Wrong Reasons seek to create of feeling of dreaming. One should have a sense of dreaming while awake and a connection to the subconscious mind.

Scher’s abstract films are all approximately two and a half minutes long. He feels that this amount of time is more than enough to allow the viewer to become engaged. Although digital tools are cheaper and faster for creating film, Scher prefers vintage machinery and technologies to create his image-rich films to effectively affect the senses. He uses the rotoscopic technique which involves projecting film frames on to paper and then tracing them by hand. After this, the paper images are animated by separately shooting each sheet as a single frame.

== Films ==
- NYC (1976)
- Reasons To Be Glad (1980)
- Aria Striata (1985)
- Prisoners of Inertia: full-length film that Scher both wrote and directed (1989)
- Milk of Amnesia (1992)
- Garden of Regrets (1994)
- Four Letter Heaven (1995)
- Nerve Tonic (1995)
- Trigger Happy (1997)
- Yours (1997)
- Shorts International Film Festival Trailers (1997/98)
- Bang Bang (1998)
- SID (1998)
- Turkish Trailer (1998)
- Postcards From Warren (1998)
- Grand Central (1999)
- Goodnight Moon (opening for an HBO special) (1999)
- You Won’t Remember This (2002)
- Spin Cycle (2003)
- Still Loaf with Guitar (2003)
- Lost and Found (2004)
- Tick Tock (2005)
- Coke Girl (2005)
- Woman on the Beach (2005)
- Memento Mickey (2005)
- Oxygen (2006)
- Paper View (2007)
- White Out (2007)
- L’eau Life (2007)
- Tulips (2008)
- All the Wrong Reasons (2008)

== Accolades ==
- Creative Arts Emmy Award: Animation for The Number on Great-Grandpa's Arm
