= Collin Dean =

American actor

- Born: January 8, 2005 (age 21); Gilbert, Arizona, U.S.
- Occupation: Actor
- Years active: 2010–present
- Notable work: The Loud House as Lincoln Loud

Collin Dean (born January 8, 2005) is an American actor. He is best known as the voice of Lincoln Loud in the Nickelodeon animated series The Loud House and as the voice of Greg in the Cartoon Network miniseries Over the Garden Wall.

== Early life ==
Dean is from Gilbert, Arizona, and has an older sister.

== Career ==
=== Voice acting ===
Dean's early voice credits include a guest role as "Tiffany" in the Cartoon Network series Adventure Time and a background role in the film Hotel Transylvania.

In 2014, Dean co-starred with Elijah Wood in Over the Garden Wall, voicing Greg, one of two brothers who become lost in a strange forest called the Unknown. Wood voiced Greg's brother Wirt. The miniseries was based on the 2013 pilot short Tome of the Unknown, in which Dean also voiced Greg. The ten-episode series was Cartoon Network's first animated miniseries and premiered over five consecutive nights beginning November 3, 2014. It won the Primetime Emmy Award for Outstanding Animated Program in 2015.

In 2016, Dean replaced Grant Palmer as the voice of Lincoln Loud in The Loud House. He also voiced one of the campers in the American Dad! episode "Camp Campawanda".

Turner Broadcasting announced a global relaunch of Boomerang in October 2014, repositioning it as an all-animation network for kids and families, with the United States and other regions to follow in 2015. Dean served as the channel's announcer beginning with the 2015 rebrand.

=== Live-action acting ===
In 2012, Dean was cast as Todd in the Funny or Die short film Will Ferrell & Zach Galifianakis Debate Children.

In 2015, he appeared as Ruprecht the Elf in the comedy horror Christmas film Krampus.

== Filmography ==
=== Film ===
Year	Title	Role	Notes
2010	Welcome to the Space Show	Hiroshi	English version
2012	Will Ferrell & Zach Galifianakis Debate Children	Todd	
2012	Hotel Transylvania	Additional voices	
2015	Krampus	Ruprecht the Elf	
2017	House Shark	Kid	

=== Television ===
Year	Title	Role	Notes
2013	Tome of the Unknown	Greg	TV pilot
2013–2014, 2016	Adventure Time	Tiffany, Candy Kids	4 episodes
2014	Over the Garden Wall	Gregory, additional voices	Voice, miniseries
2015	Halo: The Fall of Reach	Fred (child)	Episode: "Act 1"
2015–2020	Boomerang	Commercial announcer	
2016–2018	The Loud House	Lincoln Loud, Warren, kids	Voice, main role (seasons 1–3)
2016–2017	American Dad!	Camper	Voice, 2 episodes
2017–2019	Doki	Oto	Voice (season 3)
