= Over the Garden Wall =

American animated television miniseries

- Promotional poster
- Genre: Dark fantasy; Comedy drama; Mystery; Adventure; Horror; Coming-of-age
- Created by: Patrick McHale
- Based on: Tome of the Unknown by Patrick McHale
- Story by: Amalia Levari; Tom Herpich; Patrick McHale; Cole Sanchez; Bert Youn
- Creative directors: Nate Cash; Bert Youn
- Voices of: Elijah Wood; Collin Dean; Melanie Lynskey; Christopher Lloyd; Tim Curry; Jack Jones; Samuel Ramey
- Theme music composer: The Blasting Company
- Opening theme: "Prelude" (performed by The Blasting Company) "Into The Unknown" (performed by Jack Jones)
- Ending theme: "Black Train/End Credits" (performed by The Blasting Company)
- Composer: The Blasting Company
- Country of origin: United States
- Original language: English
- No. of episodes: 10

Production
- Executive producers: Jennifer Pelphrey; Curtis Lelash; Brian A. Miller; Rob Sorcher; Patrick McHale
- Producer: Pernelle Hayes
- Editors: Tony Tedford; Yoonah Yim
- Running time: 11 minutes
- Production company: Cartoon Network Studios

Original release
- Network: Cartoon Network
- Release: November 3 – November 7, 2014

Over the Garden Wall is an American animated dark fantasy television miniseries created by Patrick McHale for Cartoon Network. The series centers on two half-brothers who travel through a mysterious forest to find their way home, encountering a variety of strange and fantastical things on their journey. The show is based on McHale's animated short film Tome of the Unknown, which was produced as part of Cartoon Network Studios' shorts development program. Elijah Wood and Collin Dean voice the protagonists Wirt and Greg, and Melanie Lynskey voices Beatrice, a bluebird. The series' voice cast also includes Christopher Lloyd, Tim Curry, Bebe Neuwirth, Chris Isaak, Shirley Jones, Thomas Lennon, Jack Jones, Jerron Paxton, John Cleese and Samuel Ramey. The Blasting Company composed the soundtrack. Over the Garden Wall was broadcast throughout the week of November 3 to November 7, 2014.

The show was the first miniseries on the network. McHale first envisioned it in 2004 and pitched it to the network in 2006. After working on other Cartoon Network shows including The Marvelous Misadventures of Flapjack and Adventure Time, the network expressed interest in McHale pitching a pilot. That pilot, Tome of the Unknown, became the catalyst for Over the Garden Wall. Production of the show began in March 2014 and was largely done in Burbank, California, but many of the show's artists worked from other U.S. cities, while the program's animation was outsourced to South Korean studio Digital eMation. The series' environment evokes 19th- and 20th-century Americana, while its digital backgrounds are designed to resemble brunaille paintings.

The series was acclaimed by television critics, who praised its atmosphere and characters. In 2015, the series won an Emmy Award for Outstanding Animated Program. A one-shot comic book adaptation penned by McHale has been produced, with four further issues commissioned. This was later expanded into an ongoing comic series that ran for 20 issues and continued in a series of graphic novels and comic book miniseries. A three-minute stop motion short film, produced by Aardman Animations, was released on November 3, 2024 to celebrate the 10th anniversary of the series, bringing back several cast and crew members, including McHale, Wood and Lynskey.

== Plot ==
The series follows two half-brothers, Wirt and Greg (voiced by Elijah Wood and Collin Dean respectively), who become lost in a strange forest called the Unknown. To find their way home, the two must travel across the mysterious forest with the occasional help of the wandering, mysterious and elderly Woodsman (Christopher Lloyd) and Beatrice (Melanie Lynskey), an irritable bluebird who travels with the boys to find a woman called Adelaide, who can supposedly undo the curse on Beatrice and her family and show the half-brothers the way home.

Wirt, the older brother, is a worry-prone teenager who would rather keep to himself than have to make a decision. His passions include playing the clarinet and writing poetry, but he usually keeps these private out of fear of being mocked. On the other hand, Greg, the younger brother, is more naïve and carefree, much to Wirt's chagrin. Greg carries a frog (Jack Jones) that he found; Greg's attempts to give the frog a name are a running gag. Stalking the main cast is the Beast (Samuel Ramey), an ancient creature who leads lost souls astray until they lose their hope and willpower and turn into "Edelwood trees". Once they find Adelaide, Wirt discovers that she intends only to enslave the boys; outraged that Beatrice misled them, Wirt takes Greg and abandons her. Wirt, depressed and hopeless following Beatrice's betrayal, loses hope about returning home. Because of his lack of hope, the Beast is able to claim Wirt as his own; Greg volunteers to take his brother's place and willingly goes with the Beast, while Beatrice rescues Wirt from drowning after he falls into a frozen lake.

=== Final chapters ===
The penultimate episode shows Wirt and Greg's life as modern children. The two boys entered the Unknown after falling into a pond on Halloween. Wirt, while attempting to take back a tape of poetry and clarinet music he made for a girl he is infatuated with, followed her to a ghost story party in a graveyard. The brothers attempt to regain the tape, but a police officer scares them into jumping over the cemetery's garden wall. On the other side of the wall, they land on a train track. Wirt pulls Greg off the tracks to save him from an oncoming train, causing both of them to roll down a hill into a pond, knocking them both unconscious. This is the precursor to the first episode, explaining what sent them to a Limbo-like realm between life and death.

In the final episode, Wirt, Beatrice and the Woodsman save Greg from being turned into an Edelwood tree by the Beast. At the end of the episode, Wirt and Greg wake up in a hospital back in their hometown. As the scene ends, Greg's frog, which swallowed a magic bell in the Unknown, begins to glow, suggesting that their experience in the Unknown may have been real. The series ends with a montage of how Wirt and Greg affected the inhabitants of the Unknown.

== Production ==
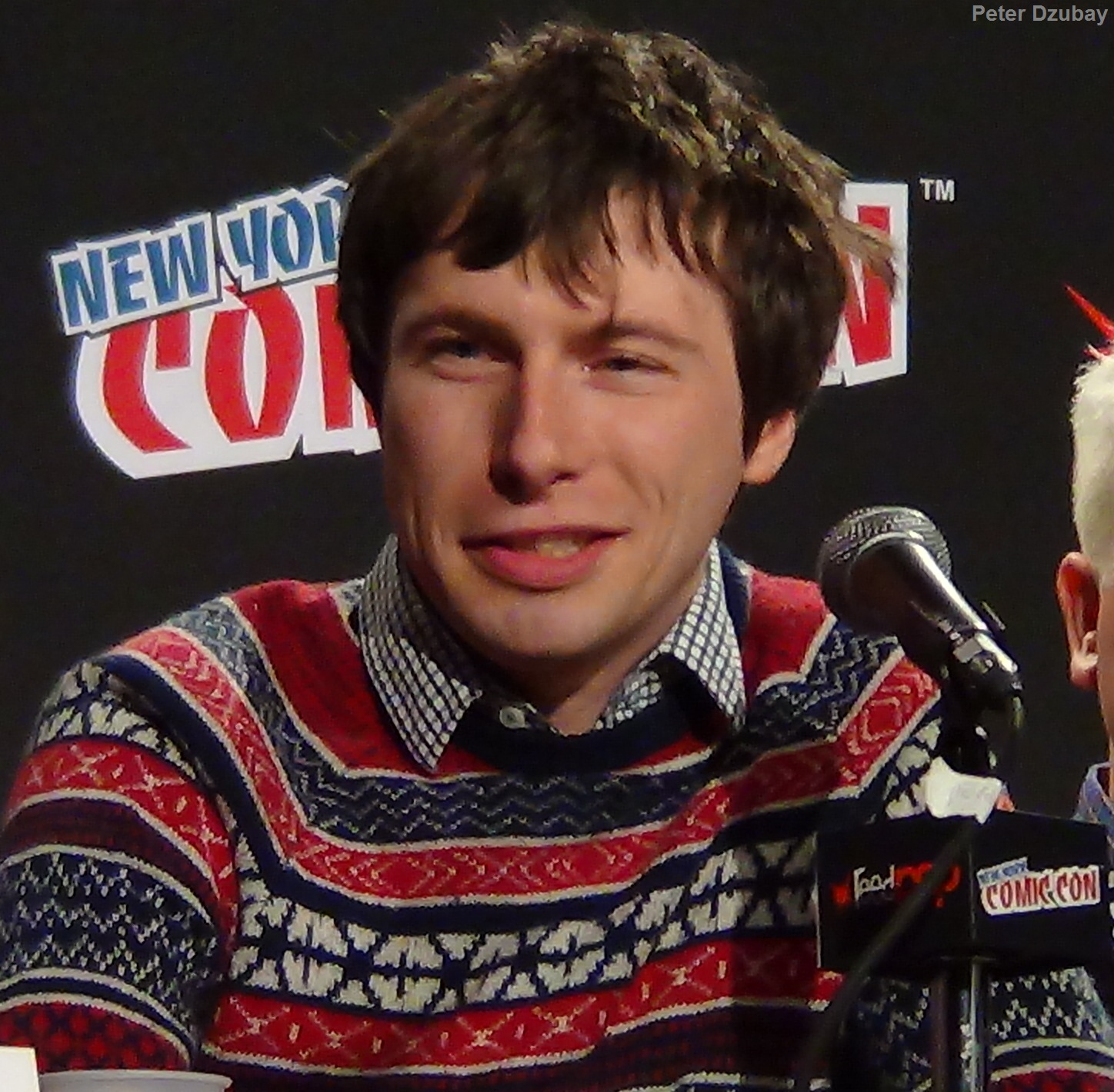
Patrick McHale, creator of Over the Garden Wall

Over the Garden Wall was first envisioned in 2004 with a scarier and more adventure-based storyline. Before working as a storyboard artist on The Marvelous Misadventures of Flapjack, artist Patrick McHale pitched the show in 2006, then known under the title Tome of the Unknown. The series would follow two brothers—Walter and Gregory—who, after signing themselves into a Faustian deal with a devil named Old Scratch, journey across the Land of the In-Between to track down the pages of a book of forgotten stories.

McHale saw it as "a possible Halloween special", but had trouble adapting the premise with a larger story arc. After his work for Flapjack, McHale moved on to co-develop Adventure Time, where he served as creative director, and subsequently as a writer. The network later asked him if he had interest in developing a pilot, which led to him returning to Tome of the Unknown, polishing it and pitching it again to the network. After creating a pilot episode, Tome of the Unknown: Harvest Melody, McHale and the network settled upon the miniseries format for the ensuing series, as McHale felt that it would lead to "something that felt higher quality than what we could do with a regular series". McHale abandoned the original idea centered around chapters of a mystical tome and the series' title became Over the Garden Wall.

Production for Over the Garden Wall commenced in late 2013. McHale initially envisioned eighteen chapters in the series, but the episode count was brought to ten to accommodate budget and time constraints. Early drafts of episodes from the show's pitch bible included a skinless witch character and a villain who carves dice from the bones of kidnapped children, as well as a running plot throughout four episodes in which Wirt and Gregory are transformed into animals (Gregory being a duck and Wirt being "either a bear or a dog ... Nobody can tell which").

The ten episodes marked the first miniseries on the Cartoon Network. The show features Wood and Dean (reprising their roles from the short), along with Lynskey as the main voice cast. McHale and his crew tried to maintain a balance between frightening imagery and "episodes that are just light and funny". For the music, McHale drew inspiration from "classic American, opera singing". Nick Cross served as art director and Nate Cash as supervising director; both worked with McHale alongside storyboard artists located in New York and Chicago. This distance proved difficult for McHale, who found it "particularly daunting considering the idiosyncratic nature of the production".

The series' art was inspired by a variety of sources, including the 1890s McLoughlin Brothers board game Game of Frog Pond, illustrations by Gustave Doré for Cervantes's Don Quixote, old illustrations for the Hans Christian Andersen story "The Tinderbox", the Cheshire Cat illustration by John Tenniel from Alice's Adventures in Wonderland, and the "Dogville Comedies" short films. McHale referenced chromolithography, vintage Halloween postcards, magic lantern slides, and photographs of New England foliage to create the show's style.

== Cast ==
Greg standing next to a seated Wirt, with Beatrice on his knee

=== Main voices ===
- Elijah Wood as Wirt
- Collin Dean as Greg
- Melanie Lynskey as Beatrice
- Christopher Lloyd as the Woodsman
- Jack Jones as Greg's Frog
- Samuel Ramey as the Beast

=== Various voices ===
- Chris Isaak as Enoch
- Noureen DeWulf as Pumpkin Gal
- Janet Klein as Miss Langtree
- Sam Marin as Old Man Langtree
- Thomas Lennon as Jimmy Brown
- Fred Stoller as Fred the Horse
- Frank Fairfield as the Toy Maker
- Jerron "Blind Boy" Paxton as the Highwayman
- Audrey Wasilewski as the Tavern Keeper
- John Cleese as Quincy Endicott and Adelaide
- Bebe Neuwirth as Margueritte Grey
- Tim Curry as Auntie Whispers
- Shannyn Sossamon as Lorna
- Deborah Voigt as Queen of the Clouds
- Mark Bodnar as the North Wind
- Fiona Bishop, Judah Nelson and Jenna Ortega as the Cloud City Reception Committee
- Emily Brundige as Sara
- Cole Sanchez as Jason Funderberker
- Shirley Jones as Beatrice's mother

== Episodes ==
=== Series overview ===
Over the Garden Wall seasons
Season	Episodes	Originally released	
Season	Episodes	First released	Last released
Pilot		September 9, 2013	
1	10	November 3, 2014	November 7, 2014
10th anniversary short		November 3, 2024	

=== Pilot (2013) ===
Over the Garden Wall pilot
Title	Written, Storyboarded and Directed by	Original release date
"Tome of the Unknown: Harvest Melody"	Patrick McHale	September 9, 2013 (LA Shorts Fest); May 18, 2015 (Online)
Wirt and Gregory grow tired of walking, so they borrow a car made of vegetables from a romantic songwriter named John Crops. They travel to a town of dancing vegetable people, unknowingly bringing crows and other dangerous animals along with them, but they manage to escape while John Crops finds a lover.

=== Miniseries (2014) ===
Over the Garden Wall episodes
No.	Title	Written and Storyboarded by	Original release date	U.S. viewers (millions)
1	"The Old Grist Mill"	Steve Wolfhard, Natasha Allegri, and Zac Gorman	November 3, 2014	1.19
Two half-brothers, Wirt and Greg, and an unnamed frog are lost in a forest called the Unknown. They meet a woodsman chopping trees, who warns them of "The Beast" who preys on lost wanderers like them. He offers to help and takes them to an old grist mill for shelter. They are followed to the mill by a fearsome creature, which the brothers take to be the Beast. Greg knocks out the Woodsman, and the two brothers attempt to fight "the beast", destroying the mill in the process. "The beast" coughs up a turtle it had swallowed and reverts back to a calm domesticated dog. Upon waking, the Woodsman is angry that the mill was destroyed. He chastises Wirt that he needs to take responsibility for himself and his younger brother. He warns them that the Beast is still at large, and advises the brothers to seek shelter in a nearby town, and give the frog a proper name.
2	"Hard Times at the Huskin' Bee"	Bert Youn, Aaron Renier, and Patrick McHale	November 3, 2014	1.19
Wirt, Greg, and the frog travel to the town of Pottsfield. Along the way, they "rescue" a talking bluebird, Beatrice, from a thorn bush. In return, Beatrice offers to guide them to Adelaide, "the good woman of the woods", who can help them get home. In Pottsfield, they find the residents celebrating a harvest festival, all dressed from head to toe in pumpkins and straw. The brothers are cautioned that they might be in Pottsfield "too early". Enoch, the village leader, charges them with trespassing and disturbing the peace, sentencing them to a few hours of manual labor. The brothers end up assisting with the harvest. As they dig holes in a field outside the village, Wirt becomes afraid the Pottsfield residents plan to actually kill them and bury them there. Instead, skeletons emerge from the graves they dug, dress themselves in pumpkins, and are warmly welcomed by the community. Wirt realizes that all of the Pottsfield residents must be skeletons. As they are allowed to leave Pottsfield, Enoch tells Wirt, "You'll join us one day." The brothers follow Beatrice to Adelaide.
3	"Schooltown Follies"	Jim Campbell and Laura Park	November 4, 2014	1.24
Wirt, Greg, Beatrice, and the frog come across a primary school with animals as students. The human teacher, Miss Langtree, mistakes Wirt for a student. All she teaches them is about how the man who was courting her left her. Greg plays outside with other animals until they all retreat into the school to escape a gorilla. At mealtime, Greg tries to cheer everyone up by singing and adding molasses to their bland mashed potatoes. The meal is interrupted by Miss Langtree's father, the school's founder. He confiscates their musical instruments and sends them all to bed. In the night, Greg and Wirt sneak out and find Mr. Langtree camping in the woods. They hear him lament that he will have to sell the instruments to continue funding the school. When Mr. Langtree wakes, he finds Greg and Wirt have organized a benefit concert, which raises enough money to keep the school open. The gorilla appears again and Wirt trips and falls into it, revealing that the gorilla is Miss Langtree's missing beau wearing a costume, having joined the circus to earn money for an engagement ring.
4	"Songs of the Dark Lantern"	Pendleton Ward, Bert Youn, and Steve MacLeod	November 4, 2014	1.24
Wirt, Greg, Beatrice, and the frog visit a tavern to ask for directions to Adelaide's house, but Beatrice is forced to wait outside after the tavern keeper throws her out, believing that bluebirds bring bad luck. The people in the tavern warn the brothers about the Beast, telling them that the creature turns people into trees of oil to burn in his lantern. Based on this description, Wirt concludes that the Woodsman must be the Beast. Hearing Beatrice in distress, Wirt steals a talking horse named Fred and rides to her rescue. He finds Beatrice unconscious next to the Woodsman. Wirt and Greg fend off the Woodsman and ride off with Beatrice. A shadowy figure appears to the Woodsman and reminds him to be careful, that the flame inside his lantern contains his daughter's soul, and that he must cut down Edelwood trees so the fire can keep her alive.
5	"Mad Love"	Natasha Allegri and Zac Gorman	November 5, 2014	1.55
The brothers pose as the nephews of the wealthy and eccentric Quincy Endicott so they can steal two cents from him to pay for the ferry to get to Adelaide's house. Endicott tells them he has fallen in love with a ghost he saw one night, but fears he is going insane. While Wirt and Beatrice search for pennies, Endicott takes Greg and Fred to search for the ghost. Beatrice reveals to Wirt that she was once human, but she and her family were cursed by a bluebird and Adelaide is the only one who can change them back. Wirt reveals he has a crush on a girl back home named Sara. They discover that the ghost is not a ghost but Endicott's business competitor, Margueritte Grey. They conclude that both of their mansions are so large that they are connected. They admit their love for each other and, thankful for his help for introducing them, each award Greg a penny. However, Greg discards the two cents in Quincy's fountain, claiming that he has "no cents, no cents at all". Fred stays with the two lovers as an official tea horse.
6	"Lullaby in Frogland"	Bert Youn and Nick Edwards	November 5, 2014	1.55
Without two cents to pay, they have to sneak aboard the ferry. All the other passengers and crew of the ferry are frogs dressed in fine clothing. Greg feels bad because his frog is nude. They disguise themselves as members of the ferry's band. With encouragement from Beatrice, Wirt reluctantly plays the bassoon as Greg's frog unexpectedly starts to sing, and they succeed in maintaining their cover. When they arrive at their destination, Beatrice, who has been acting strangely throughout the ferry ride, tries to convince them to stay in the Unknown and not to visit Adelaide. That night, Beatrice flies away to Adelaide's house. Wirt and Greg follow her in secret. The brothers learn that Beatrice originally planned to give them both to Adelaide as servants in exchange for a pair of scissors that would lift the curse from herself and her family. Adelaide attempts to capture Wirt and Greg, but is killed by Beatrice. Beatrice tries to explain that she had a change of heart, but Wirt and Greg are already gone.
7	"The Ringing of the Bell"	Patrick McHale, Bert Youn, and Tom Herpich	November 6, 2014	1.19
Wirt, Greg, and their frog come across an isolated cottage. Inside, they meet a girl named Lorna, who hurriedly hides the brothers in a basket full of turtles from her caregiver Auntie Whispers. Auntie Whispers uses a magic bell to control Lorna and makes her work constantly lest she "become wicked"; she also darkly warns that unwelcome visitors to her cottage will be devoured. The brothers try to help Lorna escape by helping her finish her housework early. Just before they leave, Greg and his frog accidentally awaken Auntie Whispers, who warns them to stay away from Lorna or they will be "gobbled up". While they are hiding from Auntie Whispers, a horrific demon possessing Lorna's body tries to eat them. Greg reveals that his frog has eaten Auntie Whispers' bell. Wirt uses the bell inside the frog to command the demon to leave Lorna's body and never return. Lorna, now free, decides to stay with Auntie Whispers. As a final farewell, Auntie Whispers warns them to beware of her sister Adelaide. Wirt begins to lose hope of ever leaving the Unknown, which pleases the Beast, who is watching from afar.
8	"Babes in the Wood"	Mark Bodnar, Jim Campbell, and Bert Youn	November 6, 2014	1.19
The brothers and frog sail down a lake, where they hear the Beast's singing, and Greg remains hopeful while Wirt has given up. They reach land and sleep under a tree for the night. Greg dreams of being welcomed by the residents of an angelic cloud city. The festivities are cut short when the North Wind is released and starts terrorizing the city. Greg defeats the North Wind by trapping it in a bottle. The Queen of the Clouds appears to Greg, allowing him one wish as a reward. He wishes to find the way home, but the Queen tells Greg that Wirt is too far gone and is covered in Edelwood branches, signaling that the Beast has claimed him. Greg instead wishes to take Wirt's place, and leaves with the Beast. Wirt awakens to find snow falling and Greg gone. He tries to chase after them, but falls into a frozen lake, only to be rescued by Beatrice.
9	"Into the Unknown"	Cole Sanchez, Vi Nguyen, and Zac Gorman	November 7, 2014	1.13
In a flashback to Halloween before the brothers get lost in the Unknown, Wirt makes a cassette tape for his crush, Sara. Greg gives the tape to Sara's friends, who put it in her jacket pocket. They tell Wirt that another boy, Jason Funderberker, intends to ask Sara out at a party. Desperate to get the tape back without embarrassing himself, Wirt follows Sara to the party and then to the graveyard for ghost stories, oblivious to the fact that Sara is delighted to see him and has no interest in Jason. A police officer jokingly scolds the teens for being in the graveyard. They scatter, and Wirt and Greg climb up an old stone wall. From the top, Wirt sees Sara finding the tape, and he panics. They jump off down from the wall, landing on train tracks. As Greg finds a frog in the bushes, a train approaches. The brothers jump out of the way and fall into a lake. They sink, both unconscious. In the present, Wirt wakes up and finds himself with Beatrice's bluebird family. He thanks them and heads off into a snowstorm to look for his brother.
10	"The Unknown"	Natasha Allegri, Jim Campbell, and Tom Herpich	November 7, 2014	1.13
While Greg performs meaningless tasks for the Beast, Beatrice finds Wirt. As Greg transforms into an Edelwood tree, the Beast attempts to persuade the woodsman to use Greg as fuel for his lantern. When Wirt and Beatrice arrive, they try to free Greg from the tree; Wirt names Greg's frog "Jason Funderburker". The Beast offers to preserve Greg's soul in the lantern, if Wirt takes over the responsibility of keeping the lantern lit. Wirt is tempted to accept this offer, but realizes that it is actually the Beast's soul that is in the lantern. Wirt frees Greg from the branches, gives Beatrice Adelaide's scissors, and finally gives the Woodsman the lantern. As Wirt and Greg leave, the Woodsman extinguishes the lantern. Wirt wakes up in the lake, back home, and pulls Greg and his frog to the surface. The brothers are taken to the hospital. Wirt wakes up surrounded by Greg, Sara, and her friends, and invites Sara to listen to the tape at his house together. The frog's stomach glows with Lorna's bell still inside. Back in the Unknown, the Woodsman finds his daughter alive, and Beatrice and her family have been restored to human form.

=== 10th anniversary short (2024) ===
Title	Written, Storyboarded and Directed by	Original release date
"Over the Garden Wall"	Patrick McHale, Dan Ojari and Mikey Please	November 3, 2024
A stop-motion short produced by Aardman Animations in which Wirt reminisces over their travels through the woods.

== Broadcast ==
McHale's original short, Tome of the Unknown, was screened at the 2014 Santa Barbara International Film Festival, where McHale earned the Bruce Corwin Award for best animated short film. It also received an honorable mention at the 2013 Ottawa International Animation Festival.

At the 2014 San Diego Comic-Con, a preview of the show was screened along with various panels for other shows on the network. Episode 2 was previewed at the 2014 New York Comic Con, which McHale and the main cast attended. The show made its premiere on November 3, 2014, on Cartoon Network, and ran over five consecutive nights. The entirety of it was published on iTunes preceding its broadcast.

The series aired on Cartoon Network in Australia from December 15 to 19, 2014 and on Cartoon Network in the United Kingdom and Ireland from April 6 to 10, 2015.

== Music ==
Various melodies and songs based on pre-1950s music are heard throughout the series. Elijah Wood, the voice actor for Wirt, has said that "if this show were a record, it would be played on a phonograph". Songs from the series include "Into the Unknown", its title song, composed by Patrick McHale and sung by Jack Jones; "A Courting Song", composed by the Petrojvic Blasting Company and performed by Frank Fairfield; and "Come Wayward Souls", sung by Samuel Ramey as the Beast.

The majority of the series' songs have been officially uploaded to YouTube. The 32-track album was released in the form of a 180-gram vinyl record by Mondo at San Diego Comic-Con in July 2016. During September 2015, an audio cassette tape titled "For Sara", based on the cassette tape labelled with the same name seen in the series, was released by Mondo, featuring poetry from Wirt (Wood) and songs featured in the tape produced by The Blasting Company.

== Home media ==
Over the Garden Wall (with the short film Tome of the Unknown) was released on DVD in Australia by Madman Entertainment on July 8, 2015, and by Warner Home Video in the United States on September 8, 2015. The DVD features all ten episodes of the show, commentaries, the original pilot, alternate title cards, and deleted animatics. Other extras on the DVD include a "Composer's Cut," an option wherein a viewer can watch the show with only the visuals and the background music; and the mini-documentary Behind Over the Garden Wall.

On April 6, 2016, Madman Entertainment released the miniseries on Blu-ray in Australia and New Zealand with the same bonus content as the DVD release. On March 2, 2020, Manga Entertainment released it in the UK on Blu-ray and DVD. On April 7, 2026, Warner Bros. Home Entertainment released the miniseries on Blu-ray in North America with the same bonus content as the DVD release.

== Reception ==
=== Critical reception ===
Over the Garden Wall was critically acclaimed. On review aggregator Rotten Tomatoes, the series has an approval rating of 94% based on 16 reviews, with an average rating of 8.60/10. The website's critics consensus reads, "Over the Garden Wall's modern sensibilities mix well with its fairy-tale setting, creating a whimsically witty series for viewers of all ages."

Preceding its premiere, Patrick Kevin Day of the Los Angeles Times called it "funny, creepy" and, from the premise, "not as simple as it sounds". In TV Guide and also before the premiere, Megan Walsh-Boyle felt that the show's fictional universe "sounds like a world worth getting lost in". Meredith Woerner of io9 called a preview of the show "amazing", "weird, and cute and great", reflecting "all the things we love about this oddball animation renaissance we are currently living in". Conversely, Amid Amidi of Cartoon Brew judged from the same preview that the animation was lacking. While not discounting its storytelling, music, and production design, he felt that production skimped on animation; he was still looking forward to the series.

Robert Lloyd of the Los Angeles Times wrote that it was "a little too folksy and fairy story" at times, but that its "contemporary strangeness wins out", and concluded that "it is throughout something to behold". Lloyd later wrote that it evoked "a kind of artisanal quality", both in its design and setting, and though the writing felt "a little too intent on its own folksiness", it became more enjoyable throughout. In The New York Times, Mike Hale also felt the writing was sometimes weak and the stories "perilously thin", but concluded that McHale developed an environment worth visiting.

Brian Moylan of The Guardian wrote that the visuals were "absolutely stunning", and that the stories contained "a certain darkness to it that is both mellow and twee at the same time, with a fair amount of anxiety creeping around the edges". Brian Lowry of Variety wrote that Garden Wall was "an admirable experiment", but not one to sustain "the five-night commitment", calling it "slightly mismatched" while praising a departure from "the more abrasive characteristic" of the network's primetime content. Kevin McDonough of the Illinois Daily Journal criticized some of the writing, but summed it up as "an ambitious cartoon" for both younger and older audiences. Jason Bree of the website Agents of Geek called the miniseries "the greatest thing Cartoon Network has ever produced". Kevin Johnson of The A.V. Club praised the series, giving it a grade of "A" and writing that "with such a perfect blend of mood, atmosphere, story, and characterization, Over the Garden Wall's 10-episode run will leave you wanting more, but like every great fairy tale, it's a story that knows when it's over."

=== Legacy ===
Over the Garden Wall has become widely associated with the autumn season, with many fans rewatching the series annually during October and November. Its visual style, drawing heavily from New England fall imagery, and its themes of transition and mystery have cemented it as seasonal viewing. According to The Week, the show has become "something of a fall tradition—or necessity," lauded for its "homey-but-creepy autumnal vibe" and nostalgic aesthetic that resonates with viewers during the colder months. Outlets like Vox and Polygon have likewise described it as "true seasonal programming" and "an annual favorite."

=== Awards and nominations ===
Awards and nominations received by Over the Garden Wall
Year	Award	Category	Nominee	Result
2015	Annie Award	Best Animated TV/Broadcast Production for Children's Audience	Over the Garden Wall	Nominated
2015	Annie Award	Outstanding Achievement, Directing in an Animated TV/Broadcast Production	Robert Alvarez, Ken Bruce, and Larry Leichliter	Nominated
2015	Reuben Award	TV Animation	Patrick McHale	Won
2015	Primetime Creative Arts Emmy	Outstanding Animated Program	Over the Garden Wall	Won
2015	Primetime Creative Arts Emmy	Outstanding Individual Achievement in Animation	Nick Cross	Won
2015	Ottawa International Animation Festival	Best Animated Feature	Over the Garden Wall	Won
2016	Teen Choice Award	Choice TV Show: Animated	Over the Garden Wall	Nominated

== Comic book adaptation ==
A one-shot comic book adaptation of the show was announced in October 2014. Produced by KaBoom!, an imprint of Boom! Studios, the comic was released on November 5, 2014. The comic was supervised by McHale and was produced as an oversized special. The comic was illustrated by Jim Campbell, a writer/storyboard artist on the television series. A special variant cover, by McHale, was also released. The success of the standalone comic led to further issues being commissioned in May 2015 and began to be released in August 2015. According to McHale, the comic books would be similar to the one-shot comic, detailing the events that occurred in between certain episodes and would expand on the television miniseries. The success of the series of one-shots led to an ongoing series of comics, serving as both a sequel and prequel to the series, rather than telling adventures that happened between episodes. The stories are told parallel, with half the comic detailing Greg returning to mysterious dreamlands in his sleep. The other half chronicles the Woodsman's daughter, Anna, and how she became lost in the Unknown. After the ongoing series ended in November 2017, the Over the Garden Wall comics continued as a series of miniseries and original graphic novels.

Overview of Over the Garden Wall comics
Title	Issue	Released	Story	Art	Collection
Over the Garden Wall (special)	#1	Nov. 5, 2014	Pat McHale	Jim Campbell	Tome of the Unknown; Trade paperback 9781608868360
Over the Garden Wall (miniseries)	#1	Aug. 26, 2015	Pat McHale	Jim Campbell	Tome of the Unknown; Trade paperback 9781608868360
Over the Garden Wall (miniseries)	#2	Sep. 23, 2015	Pat McHale	Jim Campbell	Tome of the Unknown; Trade paperback 9781608868360
Over the Garden Wall (miniseries)	#3	Oct. 28, 2015	Pat McHale	Jim Campbell	Tome of the Unknown; Trade paperback 9781608868360
Over the Garden Wall (miniseries)	#4	Nov. 25, 2015	Pat McHale	Jim Campbell	Tome of the Unknown; Trade paperback 9781608868360
Over the Garden Wall (ongoing series)	#1	Apr. 27, 2016	Jim Campbell; Amalia Levari	Jim Campbell; Cara McGee	Volume 1 Trade paperback 9781608869404
Over the Garden Wall (ongoing series)	#2	May 25, 2016	Jim Campbell; Amalia Levari	Jim Campbell; Cara McGee	Volume 1 Trade paperback 9781608869404
Over the Garden Wall (ongoing series)	#3	Jun. 22, 2016	Jim Campbell; Amalia Levari	Jim Campbell; Cara McGee	Volume 1 Trade paperback 9781608869404
Over the Garden Wall (ongoing series)	#4	Jul. 27, 2016	Jim Campbell; Amalia Levari	Jim Campbell; Cara McGee	Volume 1 Trade paperback 9781608869404
Over the Garden Wall (ongoing series)	#5	Aug. 24, 2016	George Mager		Volume 2 Trade paperback 9781684150069
Over the Garden Wall (ongoing series)	#6	Sep. 28, 2016	Jim Campbell; Amalia Levari	Jim Campbell; Cara McGee	Volume 2 Trade paperback 9781684150069
Over the Garden Wall (ongoing series)	#7	Oct. 26, 2016	Jim Campbell; Amalia Levari	Jim Campbell; Cara McGee	Volume 2 Trade paperback 9781684150069
Over the Garden Wall (ongoing series)	#8	Nov. 23, 2016	Jim Campbell; Amalia Levari	Jim Campbell; Cara McGee	Volume 2 Trade paperback 9781684150069
Over the Garden Wall (ongoing series)	#9	Dec. 28, 2016	Danielle Burgos; Kiernan Sjursen-Lien	Jim Campbell; Cara McGee	Volume 3 Trade paperback 9781684150601
Over the Garden Wall (ongoing series)	#10	Jan. 25, 2017	Danielle Burgos; Kiernan Sjursen-Lien	Jim Campbell; Cara McGee	Volume 3 Trade paperback 9781684150601
Over the Garden Wall (ongoing series)	#11	Feb. 22, 2017	Danielle Burgos; Kiernan Sjursen-Lien	Jim Campbell; Cara McGee	Volume 3 Trade paperback 9781684150601
Over the Garden Wall (ongoing series)	#12	Apr. 5, 2017	George Mager		Volume 3 Trade paperback 9781684150601
Over the Garden Wall (ongoing series)	#13	May 10, 2017	Danielle Burgos; Kiernan Sjursen-Lien	James Campbell; Kiernan Sjursen-Lien	Volume 4 Trade paperback 9781684151851
Over the Garden Wall (ongoing series)	#14	May 31, 2017	Danielle Burgos; Kiernan Sjursen-Lien	James Campbell; Kiernan Sjursen-Lien	Volume 4 Trade paperback 9781684151851
Over the Garden Wall (ongoing series)	#15	Jun. 28, 2017	Danielle Burgos; Kiernan Sjursen-Lien	James Campbell; Cara McGee	Volume 4 Trade paperback 9781684151851
Over the Garden Wall (ongoing series)	#16	Jul. 26, 2017	George Mager	Kiernan Sjursen-Lien	Volume 4 Trade paperback 9781684151851
Over the Garden Wall (ongoing series)	#17	Aug. 23, 2017	Kiernan Sjursen-Lien		Volume 5 Trade paperback 9781684152421
Over the Garden Wall (ongoing series)	#18	Sep. 27, 2017	Kiernan Sjursen-Lien		Volume 5 Trade paperback 9781684152421
Over the Garden Wall (ongoing series)	#19	Oct. 25, 2017	Kiernan Sjursen-Lien		Volume 5 Trade paperback 9781684152421
Over the Garden Wall (ongoing series)	#20	Nov. 15, 2017	Kiernan Sjursen-Lien	Jim Campbell	Volume 5 Trade paperback 9781684152421
Over the Garden Wall 2017 Special	#1	Sep. 20, 2017	Jonathan Case; Gris Grimley; Samantha Glow Knapp	Hannah Christenson; Gris Grimley; Cole Closser	—N/a
Over the Garden Wall: Hollow Town	#1	Sep. 19, 2018	Celia Lowenthal	Jorge Monlongo	Trade paperback 9781684153831
Over the Garden Wall: Hollow Town	#2	Oct. 24, 2018	Celia Lowenthal	Jorge Monlongo	Trade paperback 9781684153831
Over the Garden Wall: Hollow Town	#3	Nov. 28, 2018	Celia Lowenthal	Jorge Monlongo	Trade paperback 9781684153831
Over the Garden Wall: Hollow Town	#4	Dec. 19, 2018	Celia Lowenthal	Jorge Monlongo	Trade paperback 9781684153831
Over the Garden Wall: Hollow Town	#5	Jan. 23, 2019	Celia Lowenthal	Jorge Monlongo	Trade paperback 9781684153831
Over the Garden Wall: Distillatoria	—N/a	Nov. 21, 2018	Jonathan Case	Jim Campbell	—N/a
Over the Garden Wall: Circus Friends	—N/a	Oct. 2, 2019	Jonathan Case	John Golden	—N/a
Over the Garden Wall: The Benevolent Sisters of Charity	—N/a	Oct. 21, 2020	Sam Johns	Jim Campbell	—N/a
Over the Garden Wall: Soulful Symphonies (miniseries)	#1	Aug. 7, 2019	Birdie Willis	Rowan MacColl	Trade paperback 9781684155569
Over the Garden Wall: Soulful Symphonies (miniseries)	#2	Sep. 4, 2019	Birdie Willis	Rowan MacColl	Trade paperback 9781684155569
Over the Garden Wall: Soulful Symphonies (miniseries)	#3	Oct. 2, 2019	Birdie Willis	Rowan MacColl	Trade paperback 9781684155569
Over the Garden Wall: Soulful Symphonies (miniseries)	#4	Nov. 6, 2019	Birdie Willis	Rowan MacColl	Trade paperback 9781684155569
Over the Garden Wall: Soulful Symphonies (miniseries)	#5	Dec. 4, 2019	Birdie Willis	Rowan MacColl	Trade paperback 9781684155569

== Works cited ==
- Edgar, Sean; McHale, Patrick (2017). The Art of Over the Garden Wall. Dark Horse Books. ISBN 978-1506703763.
