= Tome of the Unknown =

Animated short film (2013)

- Title card
- Directed by: Patrick McHale
- Written by: Patrick McHale
- Produced by: Nate Funaro; Pete Browngardt (supervising producer)
- Starring: Elijah Wood; Collin Dean; Natasha Leggero; C.W. Stoneking; Warren Burton
- Edited by: Paul Douglas
- Release date: September 9, 2013
- Running time: 9 minutes approx.

"Tome of the Unknown: Harvest Melody", usually shortened to "Tome of the Unknown", is a 2013 animated short film created by Patrick McHale and produced by Cartoon Network Studios. The film serves as the inspiration and the pilot for the miniseries Over the Garden Wall, which premiered in 2014. In the film—which is narrated by Warren Burton—Wirt (Elijah Wood), his brother Gregory (Collin Dean), and Beatrice (Natasha Leggero), a bluebird, head to the big city in search of an arcane book of all known things, meeting a vegetable man along the way.

McHale initially pitched the idea to Cartoon Network as a three-season television series, but was asked to develop it into a feature film for Cartoon Network's planned feature film department. He had trouble rewriting the series into a feature, and it was ultimately put on hold when McHale went to work on Adventure Time. Several years later, Cartoon Network asked McHale for another pitch. He reworked his pitch for Tome of the Unknown, which was accepted as a pilot and made into a short film. Released in 2013 to multiple film festivals, Tome of the Unknown has received several accolades.

== Plot synopsis ==
In a large forest simply called the "Unknown," Wirt and his brother Gregory walk with Beatrice (Natasha Leggero; later voiced by Melanie Lynskey in the miniseries), a bluebird who has gained the ability to speak. The three are on their way to the big city, in search of a book titled The Tome of the Unknown, which – according to legend – contains every forgotten thing. When their legs tire, Greg suggests they ride a goose, but Wirt doubts they could find one big enough to carry them. Greg wanders off and discovers a car made from vegetables, which fascinates and confuses Wirt. The car's owner, John Crops (C. W. Stoneking), is likewise a vegetable humanoid. Crops wallows over his loneliness, wishing like the others to go the city. Wirt offers, in exchange for Crops letting them keep the car, to drive Crops to the city, where he can hopefully find a soulmate.

A murder of giant crows attacks the vegetable car during the drive, forcing Wirt to veer off into a cornfield and crash into a scarecrow pole, which scares off the crows. Crops reveals that they have arrived at the "big city," which turns out to be an old-fashioned small farm community in the middle of the cornfield.

While Wirt and Beatrice try to repair the car, Greg wanders off with Crops to explore the city's gazebo garden party, where Crops bumps into a woman made of cabbage. An announcement declares that the party's scheduled entertainment has been cancelled, and Greg suggests that Crops should perform instead. The cabbage woman finds herself flattered after learning that Crops is a musician.

Meanwhile, Wirt has trouble fixing the vegetable car until Beatrice tells him what to do. When they start the engine and try to leave, they knock over the scarecrow. This summons the giant crows, as well as giant turkeys, who terrorize the city and its vegetable inhabitants. Wirt and Beatrice pick up Greg, while Crops continues to woo the woman, unaware of the chaos around him.

As Wirt, Greg, and Beatrice attempt to escape without Crops, they are set upon by the giant animals, including an alligator, who start to devour the vegetable car. As Wirt tries to fend them off, Greg jumps out of the car and wanders into the cornfield, where he finds a goose big enough for the group to ride. Wirt and Beatrice find him soon after, guided by his loud, happy screaming. Greg's screams scare off the birds, and Crops returns home with the cabbage woman. Wirt, Gregory, Beatrice, and their new companion Goose, continue to travel onwards, deeper and deeper, into the Unknown.

== Production ==
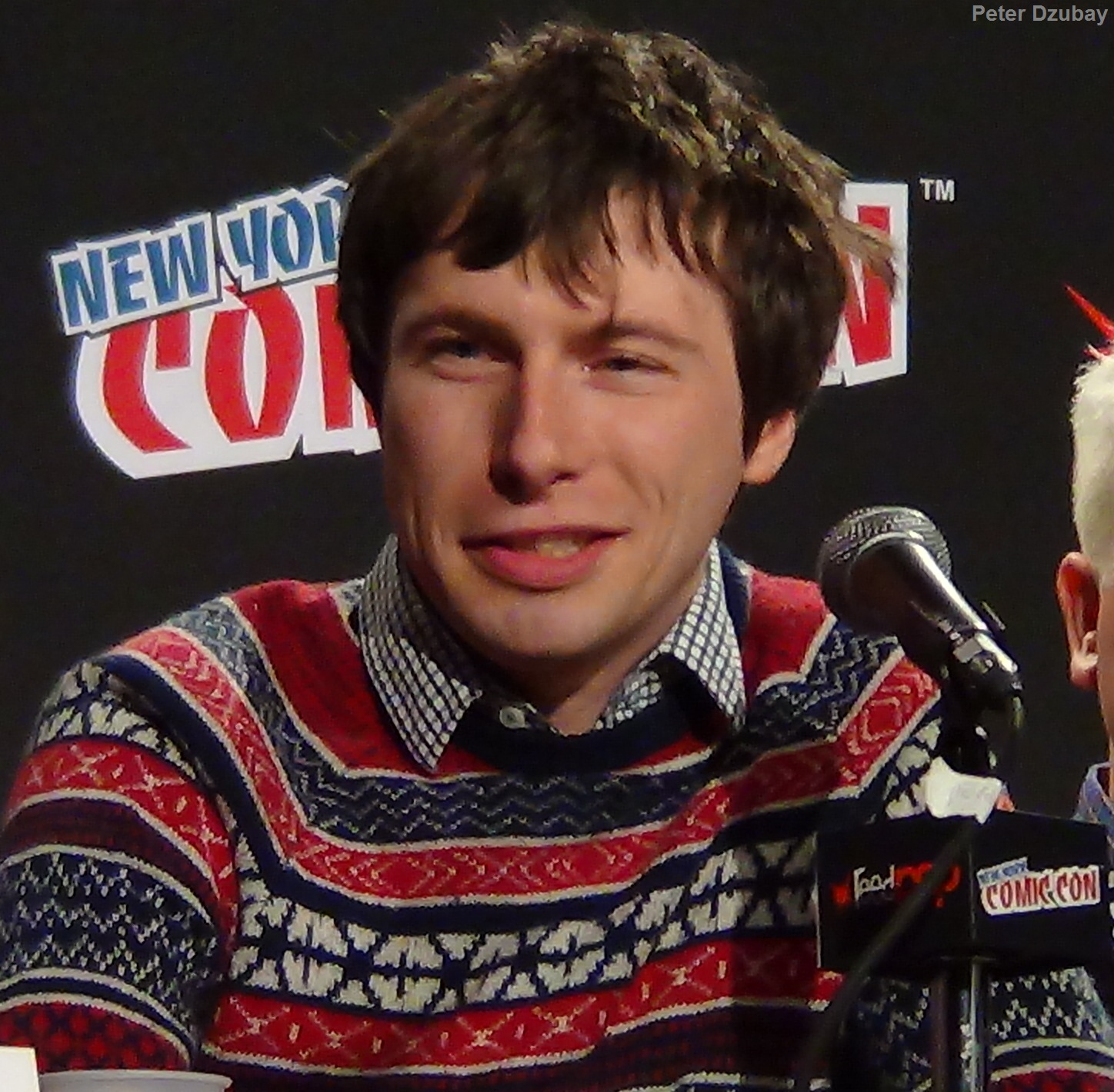
Patrick McHale, the film's director

Tome of the Unknown is a short film written and directed by Patrick McHale, who also storyboarded it. Not long after he graduated from college, McHale pitched the idea for the film, among other concepts, to Cartoon Network. At the time, the network was considering the creation of a department for feature films, though this never came to fruition. McHale was asked if it was possible to adapt the idea for Tome of the Unknown to feature length. This proved unsuccessful as he felt it needed to be episodic, laying out plans for a full television series consisting of three seasons. The project was placed on the backburner when McHale was recruited as creative director for Pendleton Ward's Adventure Time, also a Cartoon Network production.

Several years later, around 2011, the network asked McHale to pitch an idea. Although he had made several short student films and had worked in animation for other people, he had never created a professional piece of his own. As a result, McHale did not anticipate the network to have it go further than the short. The short was positively received and was accepted for production into a miniseries.

Initially conceived as an eighteen-episode miniseries, time constraints forced the series to be cut down to only ten episodes. Although it reused the main characters from the pilot, with Wood and Dean reprising their roles of Wirt and Greg, the premise of them searching for the Tome of the Unknown was abandoned and changed to a much simpler and flexible story of them getting lost and trying to find their way home, and was retitled Over the Garden Wall. The series was announced in May 2014 and premiered in November that same year. Nick Cross, who worked as a background painter with layout designer Chris Tsirgiotis on Tome of the Unknown, was hired as the art director for the series.

== Release and reception ==
Cartoon Network released Tome of the Unknown to several film festivals starting in 2013, including the 20th anniversary of the Austin Film Festival on October 24, 2013, and the International Children's Film Festival at the Museum of Fine Arts in Boston in May 2014. At the Ottawa International Animation Festival, the film won an honorable mention as one of the best short animations for children on September 21, 2013. A Bruce Corwin Award for animation was given to the film at the 29th annual Santa Barbara International Film Festival in February 2014, where it was screened in the previous month. Regarding its screening in Boston, Ethan Gilsdorf of The Boston Globe called the film marked by the presence of connections by celebrities, particularly Wood, while noting McHale for his work on Adventure Time.

The film saw digital distribution as part of the DVD release of the miniseries on September 8, 2015. The network previously released the film on their official website in May 2015. Róbert Kovács-Cohner of the Hungarian IGN gave it a high recommendation, calling the story beautiful as it occurs over the backgrounds. For their work on these backgrounds, Cross and Tsirgiotis earned juried Emmy Awards, as part of the 67th Primetime Creative Arts Emmy Awards.
