= SpongeBob SquarePants season 6 =

Season of television series

SpongeBob SquarePants
- Season 6
- DVD cover
- Showrunner: Paul Tibbitt
- Starring: Tom Kenny; Bill Fagerbakke; Rodger Bumpass; Clancy Brown; Mr. Lawrence; Jill Talley; Carolyn Lawrence; Mary Jo Catlett; Lori Alan
- No. of episodes: 26 (47 segments)

Release
- Original network: Nickelodeon
- Original release: March 3, 2008 – July 5, 2010

Season chronology
- ← Previous; Season 5 Next → Season 7

The sixth season of the American animated television series SpongeBob SquarePants, created by former marine biologist and animator Stephen Hillenburg, aired on Nickelodeon from March 3, 2008, to July 5, 2010, and contained 26 half-hour episodes, being the first season with a different number of half-hours. The series chronicles the exploits and adventures of the title character and his various friends in the fictional underwater city of Bikini Bottom. The season was executive produced by series creator Hillenburg and supervising producer Paul Tibbitt, who also acted as the showrunner. In 2009, the show celebrated its tenth anniversary on television. The documentary film titled Square Roots: The Story of SpongeBob SquarePants premiered on July 17, 2009, and marked the anniversary. SpongeBob's Truth or Square, a television film, and the special episode "To SquarePants or Not to SquarePants" were broadcast on Nickelodeon, as part of the celebration.

The show itself received several recognition, including the Kids' Choice Awards for Favorite Cartoon in 2009 and 2010. At the 2009 ASTRA Awards, the show was nominated for the Favourite International Program category, but did not win. At the 37th Daytime Emmy Awards, the show won for Outstanding Special Class Animated Program, while the directors of the show were nominated for Outstanding Directing in an Animated Program. The show was also nominated at the 2009 and 2010 BAFTA Children's Awards for the Kids' Vote – Television and International category, respectively. The episode "SpongeBob vs. The Big One" was nominated at the 2010 Golden Reel Awards. At the 37th Annie Awards, SpongeBob SquarePants was nominated for Best Animated Television Production for Children, while Tom Kenny won Best Voice Acting in a Television Production for his work on SpongeBob's Truth or Square. Furthermore, at the 38th Annie Awards, the show won for Best Animated Television Production for Children, while the crew members, Jeremy Wakefield, Sage Guyton, Nick Carr, and Tuck Tucker, won the Music in a Television Production category. SpongeBob SquarePants also won at the 2011 ASCAP Film and Television Awards for Top Television Series. The episode "Dear Vikings" was nominated at the 61st Primetime Emmy Awards for Outstanding Special Class – Short-Format Animated Programs. Furthermore, Alan Smart was also nominated at the 36th Annie Awards for Direction in an Animated Television Production or Short-form for "Penny Foolish".

Several compilation DVDs that contained episodes from the season were released. The SpongeBob SquarePants: Season 6, Volume 1 and 2 DVDs were released in Region 1 on December 8, 2009, and December 7, 2010, respectively, while the complete set was released in Region 2 on November 29, 2010, and Region 4 on December 2, 2010. On November 13, 2012, The Complete Sixth Season DVD was released in Region 1.

== Production ==
The season's executive producers were series creator Stephen Hillenburg and Paul Tibbitt, who also acted as the series' showrunner. Upon the announcement of Nickelodeon signing the new show The Mighty B! on December 12, 2006, it renewed SpongeBob SquarePants for a sixth season with 26 episodes in order, surpassing the 100-episode mark. Cyma Zarghami, president of Nickelodeon, said "One of the great things about animation is that you can play it over and over again, and kids will still watch it [...] With live action they won't." On March 3, 2008, the season premiered with the episode "Krabby Road". It was written by Luke Brookshier, Nate Cash, and Eric Shaw, while Alan Smart served as animation director.

In 2009, Nickelodeon began celebrating the tenth anniversary of the show with Square Roots: The Story of SpongeBob SquarePants, a documentary special by filmmaker Patrick Creadon, that discusses the history of the show and the ascent of the "absorbing character's journey to pop culture stardom". Creator Stephen Hillenburg, speaking by phone from Southern California, said "Ten years. I never imagined working on the show to this date and this long. I really figured we might get a season and a cult following, and that might be it." In an interview, Tom Kenny told that "What I'm most proud of is that kids still really like it and care about it [...] They eagerly await new episodes. People who were young children when it started 10 years ago are still watching it and digging it and think it's funny. That's the loving cup for me."

Nickelodeon also broadcast a 50 1/2-hour television marathon titled "The Ultimate SpongeBob SpongeBash Weekend". The marathon featured the ten most memorable episodes as picked by its viewers on Nick.com. The night capped off with a television encore of The SpongeBob SquarePants Movie at 8 PM. On July 19, ten new episodes including the special episode "To SquarePants or Not to SquarePants" premiered. Paramount Home Entertainment released a 14-disc DVD titled The First 100 Episodes on September 22, 2009. The DVD runs approximately 2200 minutes and includes the first 100 episodes of the series. A second SpongeBob SquarePants television film, titled Truth or Square, aired on Nickelodeon on November 6, 2009. Several celebrities made live action cameo appearances on the film, including Rosario Dawson, LeBron James, Tina Fey, Will Ferrell, Craig Ferguson, Robin Williams and P!nk, while Ricky Gervais provided opening and closing narration for the film.

Animation was handled overseas in South Korea at Rough Draft Studios. Animation directors credited with episodes in the sixth season included Andrew Overtoom, Alan Smart, and Tom Yasumi. Episodes were written by a team of writers, which consisted of Casey Alexander, Steven Banks, Luke Brookshier, Nate Cash, Zeus Cervas, Sean Charmatz, Derek Iversen, Tom King, Dani Michaeli, Richard Pursel, Chris Reccardi, Aaron Springer, Eric Shaw, and Paul Tibbitt. The season was storyboarded by Alexander, Brookshier, Cash, Cervas, Charmatz, King, Reccardi, and Springer. (Note: Information is taken from the opening credits of each episode.)

== Cast ==
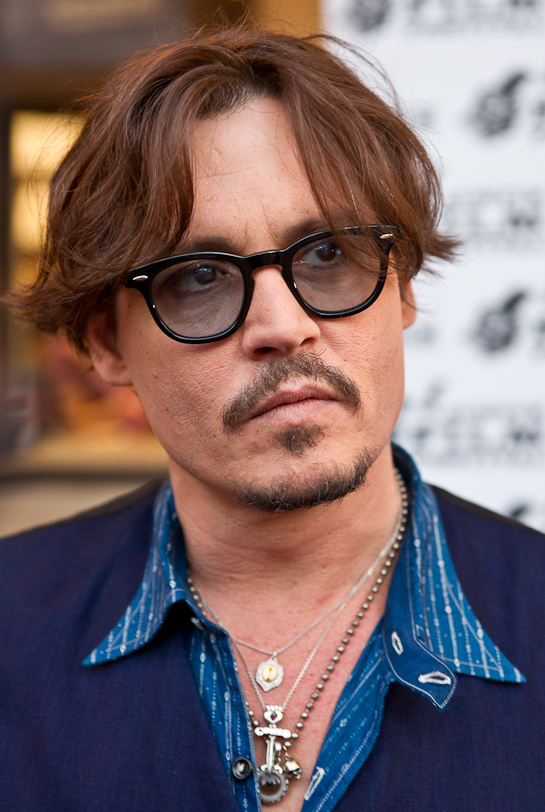
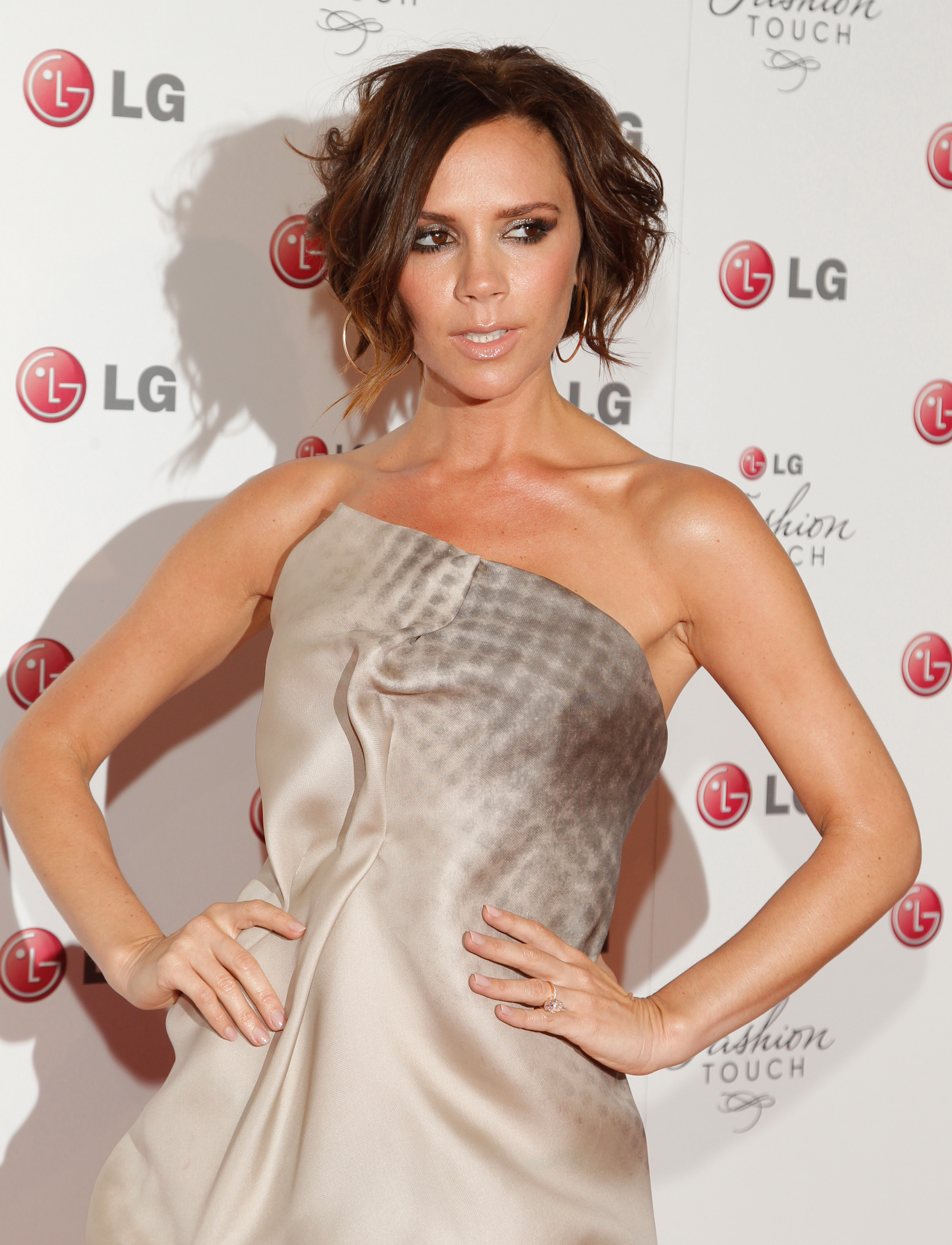
The sixth season featured many guest celebrities, including actor Johnny Depp (left) and English singer and Spice Girls member Victoria Beckham (right), among others. The two accepted to lend their voices to the show because their children were fans.

The sixth season featured Tom Kenny as the voice of the title character SpongeBob SquarePants and his pet snail Gary. SpongeBob's best friend, a starfish named Patrick Star, was voiced by Bill Fagerbakke, while Rodger Bumpass played the voice of Squidward Tentacles, an arrogant and ill-tempered squid. Other members of the cast were Clancy Brown as Mr. Krabs, a miserly crab obsessed with money and SpongeBob's boss at the Krusty Krab; Mr. Lawrence as Plankton, a small green copepod and Mr. Krabs' business rival; Jill Talley as Karen, Plankton's sentient computer sidekick; Carolyn Lawrence as Sandy Cheeks, a squirrel from Texas; Mary Jo Catlett as Mrs. Puff, SpongeBob's boating school teacher; and Lori Alan as Pearl, a teenage whale who is Mr. Krabs' daughter.

In addition to the regular cast members, episodes feature guest voices from many ranges of professions, including actors, athletes, authors, musicians, and artists. For instance, in the episode "House Fancy", television personality Alton Brown guest starred as the character of Nicholas Whithers, the host and judge of a show of the same name. In an interview, Brown described the work as "a blast". He said "I came up with this voice that didn't sound anything like me. I channeled this very strange person. Only three people I know figured out it was even me when they saw it." Actor and musician Johnny Depp guest starred in the episode "SpongeBob SquarePants vs. The Big One" as the voice of Jack Kahuna Laguna, a surf guru that taught SpongeBob how to surf. According to Sarah Noonan, vice president of talent and casting for Nickelodeon, Depp accepted the role because he and his kids were fans of the show. The episode was also guest starred by musician and The Monkees' Davy Jones who starred in the episode as himself, appearing at the bottom of the sea with his locker, and Bruce Brown providing vocal cameo as the episode's narrator. Brian Doyle-Murray also reprised his role as the Flying Dutchman for the episode. In "The Card", Ernest Borgnine returned, reprising his role as Mermaid Man. Borgnine later reappeared in the episodes "Ditchin'" and "Shuffleboarding", voicing his recurring role, with Tim Conway as Barnacle Boy. In "Dear Vikings", English actor Ian McShane voiced Gordon, the leader of the large group of Vikings outside of Bikini Bottom. Dennis Quaid also appeared in the "Grandpappy the Pirate" as Grandpa Redbeard, Mr. Krabs' grandfather. Furthermore, Dee Snider, the frontman of the heavy metal band Twisted Sister, guest starred in "Shell Shocked" as Angry Jack. Snider said "I knew they must be fans [of mine] because in the SpongeBob movie, they took my song 'I Wanna Rock' and changed it to 'Goofy Goober Rock.' I flipped at the opportunity to be in the show. I have four kids, and everybody loved SpongeBob." In the entry "The Clash of Triton", English singer Victoria Beckham guest starred in the episode as the wife of King Neptune, Queen Amphitrite. The writers created the role of a Queen Amphitrite especially for Beckham. The former Spice Girl accepted the role because her sons, Brooklyn, Romeo, and Cruz, love the show, were excited when their mother told them of the role, and looked forward to watching the episode with her. Beckham recorded the voice-over in late-2008 in a day, and claimed that she was "thrilled" to provide the vocal cameo. Other guests in the episode included Seinfeld actor John O'Hurley as King Neptune and Skid Row heavy metal vocalist Sebastian Bach as the voice of Triton.

Moreover, in the television film SpongeBob's Truth or Square, various celebrities guest appeared, including Rosario Dawson, Craig Ferguson, Will Ferrell, Tina Fey, LeBron James, Triumph the Insult Comic Dog, and Robin Williams as guest actors appearing as themselves in the live action sequences, while Ricky Gervais provided vocal cameo as the narrator.

== Episodes ==
The episodes are ordered below according to Nickelodeon's packaging order, and not their original production or broadcast order.

No. overall	No. in season	Title	Animation direction by	Written by	Original release date	Prod. code	U.S. viewers (millions)
101	1	"House Fancy"	Tom Yasumi	Written by : Aaron Springer and Dani Michaeli; Storyboarded by : Aaron Springer (director)	June 6, 2008	193–603	3.50
101	1	"Krabby Road"	Alan Smart	Written by : Luke Brookshier, Nate Cash, and Eric Shaw; Storyboarded by : Luke Brookshier and Nate Cash (directors)	March 3, 2008	193–602	4.70
"House Fancy": Squidward watches a television show about fancy houses, and his rival Squilliam is featured on it. He gets on the show, and SpongeBob helps him redecorate and prepare. After an unintentional explosion rearranges the remains of his house in an abstract style, the host declares Squidward the winner. "Krabby Road": After getting out of jail and having Karen leave him, Plankton forms a rock band with SpongeBob, Patrick, and Squidward in another attempt to get the formula.
102	2	"Penny Foolish"	Alan Smart	Written by : Aaron Springer and Dani Michaeli; Storyboarded by : Aaron Springer (director)	March 7, 2008	193–606	4.68
102	2	"Nautical Novice"	Tom Yasumi	Written by : Casey Alexander, Zeus Cervas, and Derek Iversen; Storyboarded by : Casey Alexander and Zeus Cervas (directors)	March 29, 2008	193–607	4.47
"Penny Foolish": Mr. Krabs sees SpongeBob pick something up, assuming it is a penny. He becomes jealous, and he soon starts hallucinating the penny everywhere. He tries various methods of getting SpongeBob to give him the penny, but to no avail. When he breaks into SpongeBob's house to find the penny, he is noticed, and SpongeBob reveals that he had picked up a piece of dried gum for his gum collection (actually a five-hundred dollar bill). Mr. Krabs leaves, and digs around SpongeBob's house, still thinking he has the penny. "Nautical Novice": SpongeBob's studies the complete history of boating in preparation for a class field trip to a museum.
103	3	"Spongicus"	Andrew Overtoom	Written by : Casey Alexander, Zeus Cervas, and Richard Pursel; Storyboarded by : Casey Alexander and Zeus Cervas (directors)	March 29, 2008	193–601	4.47
103	3	"Suction Cup Symphony"	Andrew Overtoom	Written by : Luke Brookshier, Nate Cash, and Richard Pursel; Storyboarded by : Luke Brookshier and Nate Cash (directors)	March 6, 2008	193–605	3.44
"Spongicus": Plankton turns the Chum Bucket into a Colosseum as a ploy to draw customers. "Suction Cup Symphony": Squidward tries to compose a symphony, but is distracted by SpongeBob and Patrick playing outside. However, the cephalopod accidentally writes their noises into it, giving him unexpected success.
104	4	"Not Normal"	Andrew Overtoom	Written by : Casey Alexander, Zeus Cervas, and Derek Iversen; Storyboarded by : Casey Alexander and Zeus Cervas (directors)	March 4, 2008	193–604	4.05
104	4	"Gone"	Alan Smart	Written by : Luke Brookshier, Nate Cash, and Steven Banks; Storyboarded by : Luke Brookshier and Nate Cash (directors)	March 5, 2008	193–608	3.85
"Not Normal": After Squidward tells SpongeBob he is "not normal", he completely reinvents himself. After his "normal" changes spread over to his job, he consults Patrick for help to turn "weird" again. At the end, the sight of Squidward's horrific, "normal" appearance terrifies SpongeBob, which instantly shocks him back into his old self. "Gone": SpongeBob awakes to find everyone in Bikini Bottom is gone, but he doesn't know why, so he tries to take on all the roles of everyone in Bikini Bottom. After trying to act like Mrs. Puff, he gets his own boat and starts obsessing over it.
105	5	"The Splinter"	Tom Yasumi	Written by : Nate Cash, Sean Charmatz, and Steven Banks; Storyboarded by : Nate Cash and Sean Charmatz (directors)	June 2, 2008	193–618	3.77
105	5	"Slide Whistle Stooges"	Alan Smart	Written by : Casey Alexander, Zeus Cervas, and Derek Iversen; Storyboarded by : Casey Alexander and Zeus Cervas (directors)	February 16, 2009	193–613	4.51
"The Splinter ": While working at the Krusty Krab, SpongeBob accidentally gets a splinter. Because of this, Squidward threatens him with being sent home. "Slide Whistle Stooges": SpongeBob and Patrick play with slide whistles. Squidward joins in, but takes the joke too far, eventually ending up in the hospital after crashing a truck.
106	6	"A Life in a Day"	Andrew Overtoom	Written by : Chris Reccardi and Dani Michaeli; Storyboarded by : Chris Reccardi (director)	June 4, 2008	193–616	3.06
106	6	"Sun Bleached"	Tom Yasumi	Written by : Luke Brookshier, Nate Cash, and Richard Pursel; Storyboarded by : Luke Brookshier and Nate Cash (directors)	June 5, 2008	193–612	3.41
"A Life in a Day": Patrick follows Larry the Lobster's advice to live life on the edge. "Sun Bleached": SpongeBob and Patrick convert the latter's house into a tanning bed so they can go to a party with all their friends, but SpongeBob stays under the tanning bed for too long and gets "sun bleached". He gets help from Patrick to cover up his condition.
107	7	"Giant Squidward"	Alan Smart	Written by : Luke Brookshier, Nate Cash, and Richard Pursel; Storyboarded by : Luke Brookshier and Nate Cash (directors)	June 3, 2008	193–614	3.81
107	7	"No Nose Knows"	Andrew Overtoom	Written by : Casey Alexander, Zeus Cervas, and Derek Iversen; Storyboarded by : Casey Alexander and Zeus Cervas (directors)	August 4, 2008	193–617	3.75
"Giant Squidward": SpongeBob and Patrick spray Squidward with fertilizer, which makes him grow gigantic. Squidward tries to prove to the citizens of Bikini Bottom that he is not a "monster". "No Nose Knows": Patrick gets a nose, but his grudge against stench makes SpongeBob, Squidward, Sandy, and Mr. Krabs very angry.
108	8	"Patty Caper"	Andrew Overtoom	Written by : Casey Alexander, Zeus Cervas, and Eric Shaw; Storyboarded by : Casey Alexander and Zeus Cervas (directors)	August 5, 2008	193–611	3.60
108	8	"Plankton's Regular"	Tom Yasumi	Written by : Casey Alexander, Zeus Cervas, and Dani Michaeli; Storyboarded by : Casey Alexander and Zeus Cervas (directors)	August 6, 2008	193–615	3.58
"Patty Caper": When the Krabby Patty secret ingredient is stolen, SpongeBob and Patrick have to find out who is responsible for the crime. At the end, Mr. Krabs (after failing to blame SpongeBob) explains that he took the ingredient just to avoid paying $1.99 for the delivery. He is arrested and punished by forcibly giving away free Krabby Patties for a day. "Plankton's Regular": The Chum Bucket finally gets a customer, who becomes a regular. SpongeBob and Mr. Krabs try to steer the customer away. At the end, it is revealed that Karen actually paid the customer to eat at the Chum Bucket, and he hated the food.
109	9	"Boating Buddies"	Andrew Overtoom	Written by : Aaron Springer and Richard Pursel; Storyboarded by : Aaron Springer (director)	August 7, 2008	193–620	3.52
109	9	"The Krabby Kronicle"	Tom Yasumi	Written by : Casey Alexander, Zeus Cervas, and Derek Iversen; Storyboarded by : Casey Alexander and Zeus Cervas (directors)	August 8, 2008	193–622	3.29
"Boating Buddies": Squidward gets a boating ticket and is forced to join SpongeBob at boating school. "The Krabby Kronicle": Mr. Krabs begins publishing a sensationalist newspaper at the Krusty Krab, though he goes too far when he orders SpongeBob to write slanderous stories about various citizens to boost the newspaper's profits. Trouble arises when the angry customers found out that Mr. Krabs has been overworking him, they take their money back and tear apart Krabs' newspaper business.
110	10	"The Slumber Party"	Alan Smart	Written by : Tom King and Dani Michaeli; Storyboarded by : Tom King (director)	November 28, 2008	193–623	4.34
110	10	"Grooming Gary"	Alan Smart	Written by : Casey Alexander, Zeus Cervas, and Dani Michaeli; Storyboarded by : Casey Alexander and Zeus Cervas (directors)	November 28, 2008	193–619	4.34
"The Slumber Party": Mr. Krabs is kicked out of the house when Pearl has a slumber party, so he sends SpongeBob to spy on her in various comedic escapades. "Grooming Gary": SpongeBob enters Gary in a pet show, with unforeseen consequences.
111	11	"SpongeBob SquarePants vs. The Big One" "SpongeBob SquarePants and the Big Wave"	Andrew Overtoom and Alan Smart	Written by : Aaron Springer, Paul Tibbitt, and Steven Banks; Storyboarded by : Aaron Springer (director)	April 17, 2009 (Note: This episode was first released on the SpongeBob vs. The Big One DVD on March 3, 2009.)	193–609	5.78
111	11	"SpongeBob SquarePants vs. The Big One" "SpongeBob SquarePants and the Big Wave"	Andrew Overtoom and Alan Smart	Written by : Aaron Springer, Paul Tibbitt, and Steven Banks; Storyboarded by : Aaron Springer (director)	April 17, 2009	193–610	5.78
A giant tidal wave hits Bikini Bottom and takes SpongeBob, Patrick, and Squidward to a distant island. Song: "'Daydream Believer"' by The Monkees
112	12	"Porous Pockets"	Tom Yasumi	Written by : Aaron Springer and Derek Iversen; Storyboarded by : Aaron Springer (director)	November 28, 2008	193–624	3.93
112	12	"Choir Boys"	Andrew Overtoom	Written by : Aaron Springer and Richard Pursel; Storyboarded by : Aaron Springer (director)	March 20, 2009	193–626	3.21
"Porous Pockets": SpongeBob becomes rich after finding a pearl, and abandons Patrick to hang out with his new wealthy "friends", as his personality is consumed by greed. Eventually, he runs out of money, his "friends" ditch him, and he realizes the error of his ways. "Choir Boys": SpongeBob stalls Squidward on his way to the men's choir.
113	13	"Krusty Krushers"	Alan Smart	Written by : Nate Cash, Sean Charmatz, and Derek Iversen; Storyboarded by : Nate Cash and Sean Charmatz (directors)	November 28, 2008	193–627	4.15
113	13	"The Card"	Tom Yasumi	Written by : Luke Brookshier, Nate Cash, and Steven Banks; Storyboarded by : Luke Brookshier and Nate Cash (directors)	November 28, 2008	193–621	4.15
"Krusty Krushers": Mr. Krabs enters Patrick and SpongeBob in a wrestling match to win money, but the two can do anything but fight, and keep getting beaten. However, their childlike nature prevents them from getting injured. "The Card": SpongeBob learns about a very rare animated trading card hidden inside packs of Mermaid Man and Barnacle Boy trading cards, and spends all his money trying to find one. When Patrick ends up finding the card in the last pack in the store, he uses it for various unhygienic and destructive means, causing SpongeBob to think it will lose its value.
114	14	"Dear Vikings"	Tom Yasumi	Written by : Aaron Springer and Dani Michaeli; Storyboarded by : Aaron Springer (director)	November 28, 2008	193–631	4.09
114	14	"Ditchin'"	Tom Yasumi	Written by : Casey Alexander, Zeus Cervas, and Dani Michaeli; Storyboarded by : Casey Alexander and Zeus Cervas (directors)	November 28, 2008	193–628	4.09
"Dear Vikings": Vikings kidnap Squidward and SpongeBob. "Ditchin'": SpongeBob ditches boating school in order to attend a comic book signing by his favorite superheroes. However, various distractions, including a badminton match, tar pits, and a hugging festival, prevent SpongeBob from returning to school.
115	15	"Grandpappy the Pirate"	Alan Smart	Written by : Casey Alexander, Zeus Cervas, and Dani Michaeli; Storyboarded by : Casey Alexander and Zeus Cervas (directors)	February 18, 2009	193–629	3.77
115	15	"Cephalopod Lodge"	Andrew Overtoom	Written by : Luke Brookshier, Nate Cash, and Richard Pursel; Storyboarded by : Luke Brookshier and Nate Cash (directors)	February 17, 2009	193–625	3.64
"Grandpappy the Pirate": Mr. Krabs lies to his grandfather that he is a pirate. When his grandfather comes over to visit, Mr. Krabs renovates the Krusty Krab into a pirate ship and has his employees (and Patrick) act as sailors. "Cephalopod Lodge": SpongeBob and Patrick get Squidward expelled from the Cephalopod Lodge, and try to get him readmitted.
116	16	"Squid's Visit"	Tom Yasumi	Written by : Casey Alexander, Zeus Cervas, and Derek Iversen; Storyboarded by : Casey Alexander and Zeus Cervas (directors)	June 4, 2009	193–632	3.61
116	16	"To SquarePants or Not to SquarePants"	Alan Smart	Written by : Luke Brookshier, Nate Cash, and Steven Banks; Storyboarded by : Luke Brookshier and Nate Cash (directors)	July 17, 2009	193–634	3.63
"Squid's Visit": Squidward won't come over to SpongeBob's house no matter how many times he asks, so SpongeBob creates an exact replica of the inside of Squidward's house. "To SquarePants or Not to SquarePants": After SpongeBob has to buy a pair of rounded pants because his square ones shrunk in the washing machine, he takes on a new personality.
117	17	"Shuffleboarding"	Andrew Overtoom	Written by : Luke Brookshier, Nate Cash, and Derek Iversen; Storyboarded by : Luke Brookshier and Nate Cash (directors)	February 16, 2009	193–630	4.51
117	17	"Professor Squidward"	Andrew Overtoom	Written by : Aaron Springer and Dani Michaeli; Storyboarded by : Aaron Springer (director)	February 19, 2009	193–633	4.03
"Shuffleboarding": Mermaid Man and Barnacle Boy are injured, so SpongeBob and Patrick take their places in a shuffle boarding match. "Professor Squidward": Squidward begins teaching a music class under the alias of Squilliam, but problems begin to occur when SpongeBob and Patrick are two of his students.
118	18	"Pet or Pests"	Andrew Overtoom	Written by : Aaron Springer and Richard Pursel; Storyboarded by : Aaron Springer (director)	March 18, 2009	193–639	3.18
118	18	"Komputer Overload"	Alan Smart	Written by : Aaron Springer and Richard Pursel; Storyboarded by : Aaron Springer (director)	March 19, 2009	193–635	3.61
"Pet or Pests": SpongeBob is left with a litter of baby worms after Gary scares the mother away, so he tries to find them a new home. "Komputer Overload": Scapegoating Karen for his years of failures to steal the formula, Plankton replaces her with new robots in order to destroy the Krusty Krab and get the secret formula – all to no avail.
119	19	"Gullible Pants"	Alan Smart	Written by : Luke Brookshier, Nate Cash, and Derek Iversen; Storyboarded by : Luke Brookshier and Nate Cash (directors)	June 5, 2009	193–638	3.00
119	19	"Overbooked"	Tom Yasumi	Written by : Casey Alexander, Zeus Cervas, and Derek Iversen; Storyboarded by : Casey Alexander and Zeus Cervas (directors)	July 19, 2009	193–637	5.37
"Gullible Pants": Mr. Krabs needs an emergency manicure and SpongeBob is left in charge of the Krusty Krab for fifteen minutes. Squidward tells SpongeBob "secrets", such as that he should serve food with his feet, and SpongeBob is gullible enough to comply with all of them. "Overbooked": SpongeBob becomes pressed for time when he is enlisted to help Patrick, Sandy, and Mr. Krabs simultaneously.
120	20	"No Hat for Pat"	Tom Yasumi	Written by : Casey Alexander, Zeus Cervas, and Dani Michaeli; Storyboarded by : Casey Alexander and Zeus Cervas (directors)	July 19, 2009	193–640	4.85
120	20	"Toy Store of Doom"	Andrew Overtoom	Written by : Luke Brookshier, Nate Cash, and Dani Michaeli; Storyboarded by : Luke Brookshier and Nate Cash (directors)	March 17, 2009	193–636	3.49
"No Hat for Pat": Jealous that SpongeBob and Squidward wear hats when they go to work at the Krusty Krab, Patrick gets hired as a tourist attracter by Mr. Krabs. However, Patrick's stint as "The Falling Fool" gets more and more dangerous, so SpongeBob has to intervene to save his best friend. Note: This episode premiered as a Comcast On Demand exclusive on July 6, 2009, before airing on Nickelodeon on July 19. "Toy Store of Doom": SpongeBob and Patrick accidentally get locked in a toy store after it closes. The two both hallucinate that the toys are turning against them, and battle a toy robot.
121	21	"Sand Castles in the Sand"	Andrew Overtoom	Written by : Casey Alexander, Zeus Cervas, and Dani Michaeli; Storyboarded by : Casey Alexander and Zeus Cervas (directors)	March 16, 2009	193–642	4.14
121	21	"Shell Shocked"	Alan Smart	Written by : Casey Alexander, Zeus Cervas, and Richard Pursel; Storyboarded by : Casey Alexander and Zeus Cervas (directors)	June 1, 2009	193–641	3.96
"Sand Castles in the Sand": SpongeBob and Patrick's day of building sandcastles at Goo Lagoon takes an odd turn when they end up in a senseless all-or-nothing war against each other using sand-built-weaponry. "Shell Shocked": SpongeBob accidentally breaks Gary's shell, so he must find him a new one.
122	22	"Chum Bucket Supreme"	Tom Yasumi	Written by : Sean Charmatz and Dani Michaeli; Storyboarded by : Sean Charmatz (director)	July 19, 2009	193–643	5.09
122	22	"Single Cell Anniversary"	Tom Yasumi	Written by : Luke Brookshier, Nate Cash, and Richard Pursel; Storyboarded by : Luke Brookshier and Nate Cash (directors)	June 3, 2009	193–652	3.53
"Chum Bucket Supreme": Plankton realizes that advertising generates business for the Krusty Krab, so he hires Patrick as his advertising executive. Patrick amazingly succeeds in getting business for Plankton, simply by advertising a misspelled slogan. Mr. Krabs gets enraged by the situation, so he works hard to lure the customers away from the Chum Bucket and back to the Krusty Krab. "Single Cell Anniversary": Plankton and Karen are having their anniversary, and Plankton cannot get a gift for her. SpongeBob helps him out with finding a gift "from his heart".
123 (Note: Alternatively listed under the syndication number #997.)	23	"Truth or Square" "Stuck in the Freezer"	Andrew Overtoom, Alan Smart, and Tom Yasumi	Written by : Luke Brookshier, Nate Cash, Steven Banks, and Paul Tibbitt; Storyboarded by : Luke Brookshier and Nate Cash (directors)	November 6, 2009	193–645 193–646	7.66
124	24	"Truth or Square" "Stuck in the Freezer"	Andrew Overtoom, Alan Smart, and Tom Yasumi	Written by : Luke Brookshier, Nate Cash, Steven Banks, and Paul Tibbitt; Storyboarded by : Luke Brookshier and Nate Cash (directors)	November 6, 2009	193–647 193–648	7.66
SpongeBob, Patrick, Squidward, Mr. Krabs, and later, Plankton, get trapped in the freezer during the Krusty Krab's anniversary celebration. While finding a way to escape, the five recall various moments from the past in flashback sequences.
125	25	"Pineapple Fever"	Tom Yasumi	Written by : Aaron Springer and Derek Iversen; Storyboarded by : Aaron Springer (director)	June 2, 2009	193–649	4.17
125	25	"Chum Caverns"	Alan Smart	Written by : Casey Alexander, Zeus Cervas, and Richard Pursel; Storyboarded by : Casey Alexander and Zeus Cervas (directors)	July 18, 2009	193–644	4.47
"Pineapple Fever": A thunderstorm hits Bikini Bottom, forcing SpongeBob, Patrick, and Squidward to stay in SpongeBob's house until it calms down. "Chum Caverns": Plankton discovers a cavern under the Chum Bucket and uses it as a new marketing ploy.
126	26	"The Clash of Triton" "Neptune's Party"	Andrew Overtoom and Alan Smart	Written by : Casey Alexander, Zeus Cervas, Aaron Springer, Steven Banks, and Paul Tibbitt; Storyboarded by : Casey Alexander, Zeus Cervas, and Aaron Springer (directors)	July 5, 2010	193–650	5.18
126	26	"The Clash of Triton" "Neptune's Party"	Andrew Overtoom and Alan Smart	Written by : Casey Alexander, Zeus Cervas, Aaron Springer, Steven Banks, and Paul Tibbitt; Storyboarded by : Casey Alexander, Zeus Cervas, and Aaron Springer (directors)	July 5, 2010	193–651	5.18
King Neptune will not celebrate his birthday until SpongeBob and Patrick find his long lost son, Triton.

== Reception ==
The show itself received several awards and nominations for its sixth season, including the Kids' Choice Awards for Favorite Cartoon in 2009 and 2010. SpongeBob SquarePants won the 2009 and 2010 Indonesia Kids' Choice Awards for Favorite Cartoon, while being nominated at the 2010 Kids' Choice Awards Mexico for the same category. At the 2009 ASTRA Awards, the show was nominated for the Favourite International Program category, but did not win. The show itself received several recognition, including the Kids' Choice Awards for Favorite Cartoon in 2009 and 2010. The series was nominated for the award in 2008, but lost to Avatar: The Last Airbender. The series also won the same category at the Philippines Kids' Choice Awards and Indonesia Kids' Choice Awards, held in 2008 and 2009, respectively. At the 2009 ASTRA Awards, the show was nominated for the Favourite International Program category. Furthermore, the show won the Choice TV Animated Show category at the 2009 Teen Choice Awards. At the 37th Daytime Emmy Awards, the show won for Outstanding Special Class Animated Program, while the directors, including Andrea Romano, Tom Yasumi, Andrew Overtoom and Alan Smart, were nominated for Outstanding Directing in an Animated Program. Alan Smart was also nominated at the 36th Annie Awards for Direction in an Animated Television Production or Short-form for "Penny Foolish". "Suction Cup Symphony" received a nomination at the 2009 Golden Reel Awards for Best Sound Editing: Television Animation. The episode "SpongeBob SquarePants vs. The Big One" was nominated at the 2010 Golden Reel Awards. At the 2009 and 2010 BAFTA Children's Awards, the show was nominated for the Kids' Vote – Television and International category, respectively. In 2010, the "SpongeBob vs. The Big One" DVD won the Best Home Entertainment Production category. The DVD release of the episode was nominated at the 37th Annie Awards for Best Home Entertainment Production. At the same award body, SpongeBob SquarePants was nominated for Best Animated Television Production for Children, while Tom Kenny won Best Voice Acting in a Television Production for his work on the television film SpongeBob's Truth or Square as SpongeBob SquarePants. Furthermore, at the 38th Annie Awards, the show won for Best Animated Television Production for Children, while the crew members, Jeremy Wakefield, Sage Guyton, Nick Carr and Tuck Tucker, won the Music in a Television Production category. SpongeBob SquarePants also won at the 2011 ASCAP Film and Television Awards for Top Television Series. At the 2010 and 2011 TP de Oro, the series won the Best Children and Youth Program category. Sarah Noonan has been nominated for two Artios Awards of the Casting Society of America, out of which she won for Television Animation. "Dear Vikings" was nominated at the 61st Primetime Emmy Awards for Outstanding Special Class – Short-Format Animated Programs; however, it had no winner as the nominees neither received the necessary 50 percent support.

The season received mixed to positive reviews from media critics. In a DVD review, Paul Mavis of DVD Talk "highly recommended" the set, saying "[The season has a shaky start], but the laughs definitely pick up on the second disc." In particular, Mavis praised the episode "The Splinter" as "one of the very best SpongeBob [episodes]," while "Slide Whistle Stooges", "Boating Buddies", and "The Slumber Party" were described by Mavis as "SpongeBob season's best offerings." In a separate review for the "Volume 2" DVD, Mavis only "recommended" it. He said that the episodes, including "Choir Boys", "Pet or Pests", "Overbooked", "Shell Shocked", "Komputer Overload", "Chum Bucket Supreme", and "Single Cell Anniversary" are "solid entries" and "all deliver steady laughs", but has doubts that "they're on a par with series' best entries like 'The Splinter', 'Slide Whistle Stooges', 'Boating Buddies', and 'The Slumber Party'."

In a DVD review for the individual episode DVD release Spongicus, Roy Hrab of DVD Verdict gave this season a negative review and said that "In my previous SpongeBob reviews I have commented that series has lost its edge. This offering does nothing to change my opinion. But what the heck do I know? Clearly, the show continues to maintain a large following and the franchise is a license to print money for Nickelodeon." The DVD consists of eight episodes and praised the episodes "Not Normal" and "Gone" by describing them "the best episode on the disc" and "a decent episode", respectively. Also from DVD Verdict, Gordon Sullivan, on the DVD release To SquarePants or Not to SquarePants, said that "[it is] a solid collection of SpongeBob SquarePants episodes." He added that "My only serious problem with this set is that it's only eight episodes long; a more complete season-style release would be more efficient. On the technical front everything is fine, with the bright, solid colors of Bikini Bottom shining through clearly and all the dialogue and effects clear and detailed." Sullivan gave the episodes "The Splinter", "Slide Whistle Stooges", and "The Krabby Kronicle" an 8/10 rating, while "Boating Buddies" received the lowest rating with 3/10.

== DVD release ==
The first 24 segment episodes of the sixth season were released on DVD by Paramount Home Entertainment in the United States and Canada on December 8, 2009. The "Volume 1" DVD release features bonus material including animated shorts. The remaining 23 segment episodes were also released under the title "Volume 2" in the United States and Canada on December 7, 2010. The DVD release also features bonus material including music videos, shorts and featurettes. In Region 2 and 4, the DVD release for the season was a complete set. On November 13, 2012, The Complete Sixth Season DVD was released in Region 1, two years after the season had completed broadcast on television.

SpongeBob SquarePants: Season 6, Volume 1
Set details			Special features
24 segment episodes; 2-disc set; 1.33:1 aspect ratio; Languages: English (Dolby Digital 5.1)			The SpongeBob History Song featurette; Animated shorts: "Separation Anxiety"; "Surfing Dreams"; "SpongeBoard"; "Balloons"; "Juiceman"; "Traffic"; "The Outfit"
Release dates			The SpongeBob History Song featurette; Animated shorts: "Separation Anxiety"; "Surfing Dreams"; "SpongeBoard"; "Balloons"; "Juiceman"; "Traffic"; "The Outfit"
Region 1	Region 2	Region 4	The SpongeBob History Song featurette; Animated shorts: "Separation Anxiety"; "Surfing Dreams"; "SpongeBoard"; "Balloons"; "Juiceman"; "Traffic"; "The Outfit"
December 8, 2009	November 29, 2010	December 2, 2010	The SpongeBob History Song featurette; Animated shorts: "Separation Anxiety"; "Surfing Dreams"; "SpongeBoard"; "Balloons"; "Juiceman"; "Traffic"; "The Outfit"

SpongeBob SquarePants: Season 6, Volume 2
Set details			Special features
23 segment episodes; 2-disc set; 1.33:1 aspect ratio; Languages: English (Dolby Digital 5.1)			Bollywood Bob music video; How To Make SpongeBob SquarePants featurette; "The Clash of Triton" shorts; "SpongeGod"; "Neptune's Origins"
Release dates			Bollywood Bob music video; How To Make SpongeBob SquarePants featurette; "The Clash of Triton" shorts; "SpongeGod"; "Neptune's Origins"
Region 1	Region 2	Region 4	Bollywood Bob music video; How To Make SpongeBob SquarePants featurette; "The Clash of Triton" shorts; "SpongeGod"; "Neptune's Origins"
December 7, 2010	November 29, 2010	December 2, 2010	Bollywood Bob music video; How To Make SpongeBob SquarePants featurette; "The Clash of Triton" shorts; "SpongeGod"; "Neptune's Origins"
