= The Clash of Triton =

- SpongeBob SquarePants episode
- Title card
- Episode no.: Season 6 Episode 26
- Directed by: Andrew Overtoom (animation); Alan Smart (animation and supervising); Casey Alexander (storyboard); Zeus Cervas (storyboard); Aaron Springer (storyboard)
- Written by: Casey Alexander; Zeus Cervas; Aaron Springer; Steven Banks; Paul Tibbitt
- Production code: 193-650/193-651
- Original air date: July 5, 2010

Guest appearances
- John O'Hurley as King Neptune; Victoria Beckham as Queen Amphitrite; Sebastian Bach as Triton

Episode chronology
← Previous "Chum Caverns"	Next → "Tentacle-Vision (Squid-TV)"
- SpongeBob SquarePants (season 6)

"The Clash of Triton", also known as "Neptune's Party", is the 26th and final episode of the sixth season of the American animated television series SpongeBob SquarePants, and the 126th episode of the series overall. It originally aired on Nickelodeon in the United States on July 5, 2010.

The series follows the adventures and endeavors of the title character and his various friends in the underwater city of Bikini Bottom. In this episode, King Neptune wants to celebrate his 5,000th birthday at the Krusty Krab, but he is depressed about his long-disowned son, Triton. Determined to make this the king's happiest birthday ever and save the day, SpongeBob goes to set out and find Triton and bring him back to the party.

The episode was written by Casey Alexander, Zeus Cervas, Aaron Springer, Steven Banks, and Paul Tibbitt, and the animation was directed by Andrew Overtoom and supervising director, Alan Smart. Alexander, Cervas, and Springer also served as storyboard directors on the episode. It features guest appearances by John O'Hurley, Victoria Beckham, and Sebastian Bach. Upon release, the episode was watched by 5.2 million viewers, and met mixed reviews.

== Plot summary ==
King Neptune wants to celebrate his 5,000th birthday at the Krusty Krab. SpongeBob and the crew spare no expense for the gala, rolling out the red carpet to welcome the royal family. Despite the party itself, the king's spirits are brought down in despondency by the absence of his estranged son, Triton, spoiling the festivities for everyone, especially his wife, Queen Amphitrite. Triton was banished to a cage on the deserted Island in the Sky, until he was ready to be a "proper" god, having displeased his father with his growing interests in the mortal world and his desire to benefit them. The event of Triton's exile devastates Neptune before Amphitrite attempts to comfort him.

Determined to make this the king's happiest birthday ever and save the day, SpongeBob sets out to find Triton and bring him to the party. Once found, Triton initially ignores SpongeBob, but after smelling SpongeBob's terrible smell, he tells him to undo the lock. Unable to figure it out, SpongeBob calls his best friend, Patrick, to help out. Patrick unlocks Triton's cage, the prince turning it into a car and offers the two a "ride" to escape the island. No one anticipates Triton's wrath; he rejects SpongeBob and Patrick, leaving Triton alone to destroy Bikini Bottom to get revenge on his father for imprisoning him.

Noticing that something is wrong at the Krusty Krab, SpongeBob and Patrick enter the building from the back, discovering the guests and staff locked in a cage. King Neptune begs Triton to release everybody else and take him instead, but he ignores him. When SpongeBob and Patrick come to unlock the cage, Triton, in great dismay, attempts to escape from his father, who catches up to him. King Neptune is angered that he can't tolerate his son's wrongdoings and is about to punish him, but on seeing how Triton destroyed Bikini Bottom, he explains that he's finally using his powers and causing havoc among mortals at last and pleads with his father not to send him back to the cage.

Realizing that he just gave him the best birthday present he has ever received instead of punishing him, the two finally reconcile, with Triton becoming a worthy successor. The family leaves for home, with King Neptune crediting SpongeBob for this development; despite SpongeBob being very happy with himself, the townsfolk of Bikini Bottom see differently, chasing him and Patrick in an angry mob.

== Production ==
"The Clash of Triton" was written by Casey Alexander, Zeus Cervas, Aaron Springer, Steven Banks, and Paul Tibbitt, with Andrew Overtoom and supervising director, Alan Smart serving as animation directors. Alexander, Cervas, and Springer also served as storyboard directors. Writer Banks said that the writing crew "liked the idea of gods and of Triton as an angry teenager dealing with his father. It all goes back to Greek tragedy." The episode originally aired on Nickelodeon in the United States on July 5, 2010.

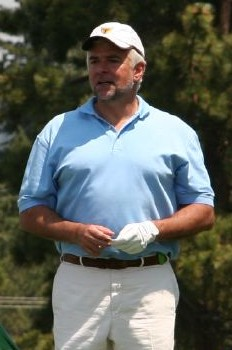
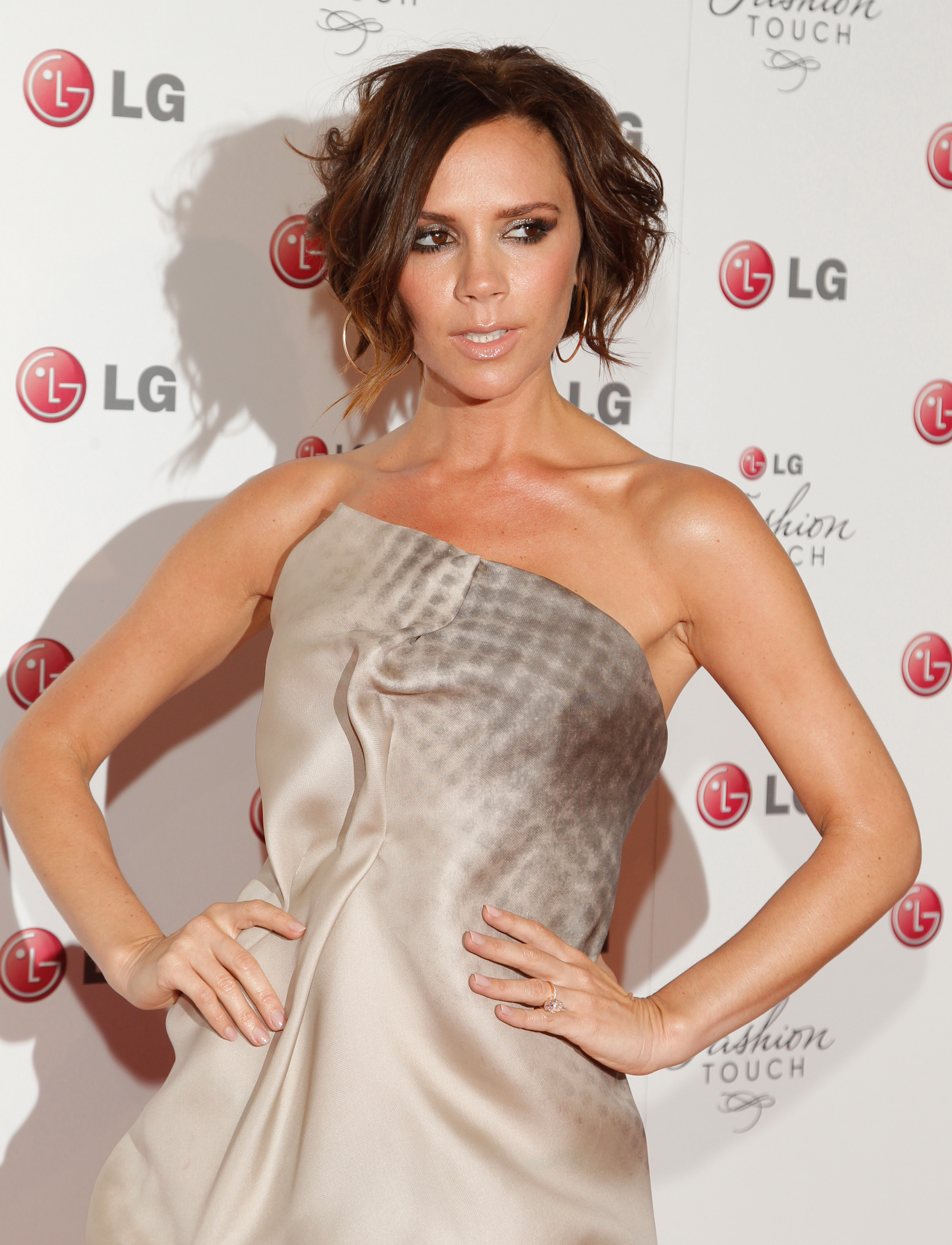
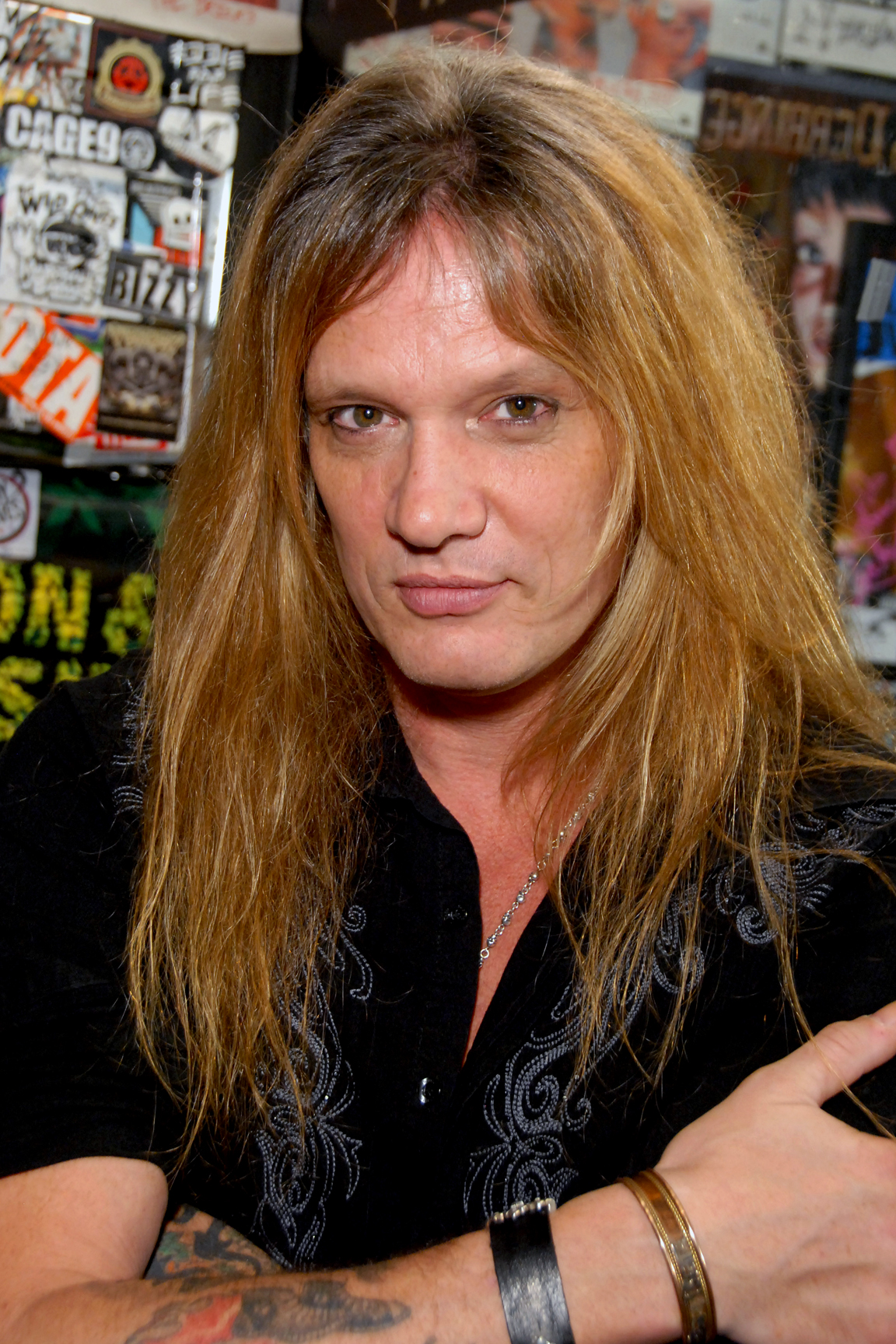
The episode guest starred John O'Hurley (left), Victoria Beckham (center), and Sebastian Bach (right).

In addition to the regular cast, English singer Victoria Beckham guest starred in the episode as the wife of King Neptune, Queen Amphitrite. The writers created the role of a Queen Amphitrite especially for Beckham. The former Spice Girl accepted the role because her sons, Brooklyn, Romeo, and Cruz, love the show, were excited when their mother told them of the role, and looked forward to watching the episode with her.

Beckham recorded the voice-over in late-2008 in a day, and claimed that she was "thrilled" to provide the vocal cameo. Other guests including Seinfeld actor John O'Hurley also made a vocal cameo in the episode as King Neptune, and Skid Row heavy metal vocalist Sebastian Bach as the voice of Triton.

Ideas for casting guest voices often come from the writers and executive producer, said Sarah Noonan, vice president of talent and casting for Nickelodeon. Steven Banks told "But the harder part was for Sebastian. I was so pleased that he really could sound like a pimple-faced, snotty teenager." Nickelodeon animation president Brown Johnson said "We're happy to have such a talented and eclectic group of celebrities lend their voices to this SpongeBob special[...] Victoria [Beckham], John [O'Hurley] and Sebastian [Bach] truly brought Bikini Bottom's royal family to life."

On July 13, 2010, the episode became available on DVD titled Triton's Revenge as Paramount Home Entertainment and Nickelodeon announced its release. The DVD features six other episodes including "Sand Castles in the Sand", "Shell Shocked", "Chum Bucket Supreme", "Single Cell Anniversary", "Tentacle-Vision", and "I Heart Dancing", and special features such as shorts of the episode and Fanboy & Chum Chum episodes. It was also released in the series' season six DVD compilation. On June 4, 2019, "The Clash of Triton" was released on the SpongeBob SquarePants: The Next 100 Episodes DVD, alongside all the episodes of seasons six through nine.

== Reception ==
The premiere of "The Clash of Triton" drew 2.8 million kids 2–11, 2.0 million kids 6–11, 1.5 million teens 9–14 and 5.2 million total viewers age 2+ for Nickelodeon. SpongeBob.com had its most trafficked week in 2010 with 1.4 million unique visitors, 15.1 million page views, and 5.7 million total game sessions. Additionally, the new Nick Game of the Week based on the special generated 1.2 million game sessions.

"The Clash of Triton" received mixed to positive reviews from critics. Steve Earhart called the episode "a hilarious special that runs perfect with the six other quirky and crazy-funny episode". Shannon Gosney of The Mommy-Files said that "you'll love this special[...]" Nancy Basile of About.com said "it was funny enough and endearing enough to make it well worth watching". Gord Lacey of TV Shows on DVD claimed: "I enjoyed 'Clash of the Triton', and the bonus episode of Fanboy & Chum Chum was neat." Ken Tucker of the Entertainment Weekly said: "The values of SpongeBob remain intact. The script’s rapid-fire gags, the show's wildly bright color palette, and the series' resolute avoidance of heavy-handed messages combine to give Stephen Hillenburg's SpongeBob its adventurous energy." He added, "[SpongeBob] SquarePants just doesn't seem to get old, does it?"

Maxie Zeus of Toon Zone said, "the plot isn't even well structured, being slack and inefficient about getting from one situation to the next." He added, "the whole special is like this: plot points clumsily rolled out to 'motivate' other plot points, which are themselves there only to motivate yet more plot points. But somehow, while they were distracted by all this wheezing machinery, they forgot to put any actual humor in." Paul Mavis of DVD Talk said: "'The Clash of Triton' spends way too much time on exposition, setting up the short's premise, while skimping on what should have been a priority: the jokes." In his review for the DVD Verdict, Roy Hrab gave the episode's DVD a negative review and said: "[L]oud noises and frantic action fill the screen to little or no purpose. It's all punch lines and no jokes or clever set-ups."
