= SpongeBob SquarePants season 8 =

Season of television series

SpongeBob SquarePants
- Season 8
- DVD cover
- Showrunner: Paul Tibbitt
- Starring: Tom Kenny; Bill Fagerbakke; Rodger Bumpass; Clancy Brown; Mr. Lawrence; Jill Talley; Carolyn Lawrence; Mary Jo Catlett; Lori Alan
- No. of episodes: 26 (47 segments)

Release
- Original network: Nickelodeon
- Original release: March 26, 2011 – November 23, 2012

Season chronology
- ← Previous; Season 7 Next → Season 9

The eighth season of the American animated television series SpongeBob SquarePants, created by former marine biologist and animator Stephen Hillenburg, originally aired on Nickelodeon in the United States from March 26, 2011, to November 23, 2012, and contained 26 half-hour episodes, with a miniseries titled SpongeBob's Runaway Roadtrip. The series chronicles the exploits and adventures of the title character and his various friends in the fictional underwater city of Bikini Bottom. The season was executive produced by series creator Hillenburg and writer Paul Tibbitt, who also acted as the showrunner. In 2011, SpongeBob's Runaway Roadtrip, an anthology series consisting of five episodes from the season, was launched.

The show itself received several recognitions, including the 2011 and 2012 Kids' Choice Awards for Favorite Cartoon. The series was also nominated in various international Kids' Choice Awards ceremonies for the same category. At the 39th Daytime Emmy Awards the show received four nominations—including Outstanding Children's Animated Program, Outstanding Directing in an Animated Program, Outstanding Performer in an Animated Program for Rodger Bumpass as Squidward Tentacles, and Outstanding Sound Editing -Animation. At the 40th Daytime Emmy Awards, the series was nominated for Outstanding Achievement in Sound Editing – Animation. The show won the BAFTA Children's Awards for the International category. The episode "It's a SpongeBob Christmas!" was well received at the 40th Annie Awards, being nominated for three categories, including a successful win for Dan Driscoll for the Character Animation in an Animated Television or other Broadcast Venue Production category. In 2012, it was reported that the show was receiving a decline in ratings. The Wall Street Journal suggested the show's age and oversaturation on the network may be key factors, while its Netflix streaming deal was also suggested to have contributed to this decline. Netflix's deal with Viacom expired a year after the end of the season, removing shows such as SpongeBob, and Dora the Explorer, and moved its library to Amazon.com, and later Paramount+.

Several compilation DVDs that contained episodes from the season were released. The SpongeBob SquarePants: The Complete Eighth Season DVD was released in region 1 on March 12, 2013, region 2 on October 28, 2013, and region 4 on October 30, 2013.

== Production ==
The season's executive producers were series creator Stephen Hillenburg and Paul Tibbitt, who also acted as the series' showrunner. On December 15, 2009, Nickelodeon announced that it had picked up SpongeBob SquarePants for an eighth season, during the year which the show was celebrating its tenth anniversary on television; the New York Daily News reported a day before that it was picked up for an additional 26 episodes. The season's episode order would bring the total number of episodes for the series to 178, surpassing Rugrats in episodes. The season premiered with the episodes "A Friendly Game" and "Oral Report" on March 26, 2011. "A Friendly Game" was written by Casey Alexander, Zeus Cervas and Steven Banks, with Tom Yasumi serving as animation director. "Oral Report" was written by Alexander, Cervas and Dani Michaeli, and the animation was directed by Alan Smart.

Animation was handled overseas in South Korea at Rough Draft Studios. In 2012, Nickelodeon produced and debuted "It's a SpongeBob Christmas!", the first full-length episode of the series that was produced in stop motion animation. Mark Caballero, Seamus Walsh, and Christopher Finnegan of Screen Novelties animated it, and Caballero and Walsh also served as its directors. Production on the episode began in October 2011 at Los Angeles, California. According to Finnegan, it took about five months to shoot, with a couple of months on either end for research and development and post. Animation directors credited with episodes in the eighth season included Caballero, Andrew Overtoom, Alan Smart, Walsh, and Tom Yasumi. Episodes were written by a team of writers, which consisted of Alexander, Banks, Luke Brookshier, Nate Cash, Marc Ceccarelli, Cervas, Sean Charmatz, Andrew Goodman, Derek Iversen, Mr. Lawrence, Michaeli, Richard Pursel, Aaron Springer, Paul Tibbitt, and Vincent Waller. (Note: Information is taken from the opening credits of each episode.) The season was storyboarded by Alexander, Brookshier, Cash, Ceccarelli, Cervas, Charmatz, Springer, and Waller. This is the last season to be produced in standard definition.

== Cast ==
The eighth season featured Tom Kenny as the voice of the title character SpongeBob SquarePants and his pet snail Gary. SpongeBob's best friend, a starfish named Patrick Star, was voiced by Bill Fagerbakke, while Rodger Bumpass played the voice of Squidward Tentacles, an arrogant and ill-tempered octopus. Other members of the cast were Clancy Brown as Mr. Krabs, a miserly crab obsessed with money who is SpongeBob's boss at the Krusty Krab; Mr. Lawrence as Plankton, a small green copepod and Mr. Krabs' business rival; Jill Talley as Karen, Plankton's sentient computer sidekick; Carolyn Lawrence as Sandy Cheeks, a squirrel from Texas; Mary Jo Catlett as Mrs. Puff, SpongeBob's boating school teacher; and Lori Alan as Pearl, a teenage whale who is Mr. Krabs' daughter.

In addition to the regular cast members, episodes feature guest voices from many ranges of professions, including actors, musicians, and artists. For instance, in the episode "Ghoul Fools", American actor and comedian Chris Elliott guest starred in the episode as Lord Poltergeist, ghost pirate who runs a "haunted house boat." Ernest Borgnine and Tim Conway returned in the episode "Mermaid Man Begins", reprising their roles as SpongeBob and Patrick's favorite superheroes, Mermaid Man and Barnacle Boy, respectively. They reappeared in "Super Evil Aquatic Villain Team Up is Go!", voicing their respective roles. In "Pet Sitter Pat", Marion Ross voiced her recurring role as Grandma SquarePants, SpongeBob's grandmother. The episode "Pet Sitter Pat" was Marion Ross' last voice-over work for the series as she had officially retired from acting in 2018. Brian Doyle-Murray reprised his role as the Flying Dutchman for "Ghoul Fools". In "The Way of the Sponge", comedian Rich Fulcher guest starred as Fuzzy Acorns, Sandy's karate instructor. John Goodman guest starred in the special episode "It's a SpongeBob Christmas!" as Santa Claus. In "Hello Bikini Bottom", Andy Samberg voiced the character of Colonel Carper, a concert manager who wants to become SpongeBob and Squidward's band manager. Samberg said "I've been a SpongeBob fan for years, so I was honored to be asked. It's one of the few shows ever that's just as funny for kids as it is for adults."

== Reception ==
=== Ratings ===
Compared to the previous years of the show, the eighth season of SpongeBob SquarePants marked a decline in viewership. In 2012, Nielsen reported that the average number of viewers aged 2 to 11 watching SpongeBob at any given time dropped 29% in the first quarter from a year earlier. Wall Street Journal business writer John Jannarone suggested that the age of the series and oversaturation of the show may have contributed to the decline, which may also be affecting Nickelodeon's overall ratings, while media analyst Todd Juenger directly attributed the decline in Nickelodeon's ratings to the availability of streaming video content on services like Netflix. Viacom's then-president and CEO Philippe Dauman contradicted the notion, claiming that the media company was getting "nice revenues" from their Netflix deal. A Nickelodeon spokesman similarly denied that SpongeBob was in any way a problem with the channel's ratings. Dauman blamed the drop on "some ratings systemic issues" at Nielsen, citing extensive set-top-box data that "does in no way reflect" the Nielsen data. Juenger also notes that SpongeBob could affect the ratings of other Nickelodeon programming because children often change channels to find their favorite program, then stay tuned into that network.

On April 22, 2013, Netflix CEO Reed Hastings announced their intentions not to renew their existing deal with Viacom. Since then, Viacom's deal with Netflix expired, and shows such as SpongeBob and Dora the Explorer are not available to stream in the United States. On June 4, 2013, Viacom announced a $200 million multi-year licensing agreement which would move its programs, such as SpongeBob and Dora the Explorer, to Amazon.com.

=== Reviews and accolades ===
At the 39th Annie Awards, Dani Michaeli, Sean Charmatz, Nate Cash, Luke Brookshier and Paul Tibbitt were nominated for Best Writing in an Animated Television Production for the episode "Patrick's Staycation". Moreover, directors Mark Caballero and Seamus Walsh also received a nomination at the 40th Annie Awards for Directing in an Animated Television or other Broadcast Venue Production for the episode "It's a SpongeBob Christmas!". Nominated for the same episode, Dan Driscoll won the Character Animation in an Animated Television or other Broadcast Venue Production category. Savelen Forrest received the same nomination for his work on the episode, but lost. The episode was also nominated at the 2013 Golden Reel Awards for Best Sound Editing – Sound Effects, Foley, Dialogue and ADR Animation in Television. "It's a SpongeBob Christmas!" was nominated at the Annecy International Animated Film Festival for Special Award for a TV Series.

The show itself received several recognition. At the 39th Daytime Emmy Awards the show received four nominations—including Outstanding Children's Animated Program, Outstanding Directing in an Animated Program, Outstanding Performer in an Animated Program for Rodger Bumpass as Squidward Tentacles, and Outstanding Sound Editing – Animation. At the 40th Daytime Emmy Awards, the series was nominated for Outstanding Achievement in Sound Editing – Animation. The show was nominated at the Producers Guild of America for the Children's Program category. At the BAFTA Children's Awards, the show won the International category. At the 2011 and 2012 ASCAP Film and Television Awards, SpongeBob SquarePants won the Top Television Series category. Furthermore, at the 2011 Kids' Choice Awards, the show won the Favorite Cartoon category. The series also won the succeeding year's Kids' Choice Awards and the 2011 Indonesia Kids' Choice Awards for the same category. SpongeBob SquarePants also received Favorite Cartoon nominations at the Kids' Choice Awards Argentina 2011 and 2012, and at the 2012 Kids' Choice Awards Mexico. At the TP de Oro, the show won the Best Children and Youth Program category.

The season received positive reviews from media critics. In his review for The Boston Globe, Tom Russo was positive on the season DVD set. Russo praised the episode that "topped the shortlist", "Plankton's Good Eye", writing "the micro-antagonist clones one of SpongeBob's eyeballs for himself, and suddenly develops a more bubbly worldview." Author Richard Reitsma cited a scene in "Squidward's School for Grown-Ups", in which SpongeBob tries to win back Patrick's friendship by dressing as the operatic Brünnhilde (just as Bugs Bunny did in the classic 1957 cartoon What's Opera, Doc?), as an example of the supposed gay subtext in the series, claimed to exist by some critics of the show and denied by its creator.

== Episodes ==
The episodes are ordered below according to Nickelodeon's packaging order, and not their original production or broadcast order.

No. overall	No. in season	Title	Animation direction by	Written by	Original release date	Prod. code	U.S. viewers (millions)
153	1	"Accidents Will Happen"	Andrew Overtoom	Written by : Luke Brookshier, Nate Cash, and Dani Michaeli; Storyboarded by : Luke Brookshier and Nate Cash (directors)	July 18, 2011	268–801	3.80
153	1	"The Other Patty"	Andrew Overtoom	Written by : Luke Brookshier, Nate Cash, and Mr. Lawrence; Storyboarded by : Luke Brookshier and Nate Cash (directors)	June 25, 2011	268–804	3.82
"Accidents Will Happen": When Squidward twists his ankle on the job, he threatens to take legal action unless his employer, Mr. Krabs, agrees to cater to him to his every need. Mr. Krabs, who eventually gets tired of doing everything for Squidward, hires SpongeBob and Patrick to investigate the scene. It is revealed in surveillance camera footage that Squidward is lying. The episode ends with Squidward catering Mr. Krabs as punishment for faking an accident. "The Other Patty": Mr. Krabs and Plankton find a common enemy — a popular new restaurant — and work together to steal the secret formula of its burgers.
154	2	"Drive Thru"	Tom Yasumi	Written by : Aaron Springer and Dani Michaeli; Storyboarded by : Aaron Springer (director)	July 19, 2011	268–807	3.68
154	2	"The Hot Shot"	Alan Smart	Written by : Aaron Springer and Derek Iversen; Storyboarded by : Aaron Springer (director)	June 18, 2011	268–802	3.49
"Drive Thru": Instead of paying money to repair a hole in the wall of the Krusty Krab, Mr. Krabs decides to use it to gain more income by turning it into a drive-thru window. However, to avoid spending money, Mr. Krabs refuses to purchase adequate equipment for the drive-thru, nor hire extra employees to work the drive-thru. When SpongeBob and Squidward get overwhelmed, Mr. Krabs keeps pounding more holes into the walls of the restaurant to create more drive-thrus, until the Krusty Krab falls into pieces. "The Hot Shot": SpongeBob gets driving lessons from the son of a legendary race-car driver, Tony Fast Jr., who inadvertently gets them both into trouble.
155	3	"A Friendly Game"	Tom Yasumi	Written by : Casey Alexander, Zeus Cervas, and Steven Banks; Storyboarded by : Casey Alexander and Zeus Cervas (directors)	March 26, 2011	268–803	4.55
155	3	"Sentimental Sponge"	Alan Smart	Written by : Luke Brookshier, Nate Cash, and Mr. Lawrence; Storyboarded by : Luke Brookshier and Nate Cash (directors)	April 2, 2011	268–808	3.27 (Note: Due to airing as a part of Nickelodeon's Countdown to the Kids' Choice Awards 2011 event, the exact ratings for this episode went undocumented. The ratings listed here are what the 7:30pm half-hour of this event received.)
"A Friendly Game": SpongeBob and Patrick decide to build an indoor miniature golf course in SpongeBob's house. Squidward tells the two to keep the noise down while constructing the course. SpongeBob and Patrick try not to disturb Squidward while Patrick distracts SpongeBob to make him lose the game. "Sentimental Sponge": After Patrick tells him to be more sentimental, SpongeBob becomes a hoarder, disturbing Squidward.
156	4	"Frozen Face-Off"	Andrew Overtoom and Tom Yasumi	Written by : Casey Alexander, Zeus Cervas, Derek Iversen, Dani Michaeli, and Richard Pursel; Storyboarded by : Casey Alexander and Zeus Cervas (directors)	July 15, 2011	268–805	5.76
156	4	"Frozen Face-Off"	Andrew Overtoom and Tom Yasumi	Written by : Casey Alexander, Zeus Cervas, Derek Iversen, Dani Michaeli, and Richard Pursel; Storyboarded by : Casey Alexander and Zeus Cervas (directors)	July 15, 2011	268–806	5.76
SpongeBob and Patrick, Mr. Krabs, Squidward, Sandy Cheeks, Plankton, Karen, and Gary participate in a sled worm race for one million dollars. However, just before the race begins, Plankton sneaks off to the Krusty Krab and uses a robot as his replacement in the race. Plankton goes inside the Krusty Krab to steal the Krabby Patty formula, while the group must evade attacks from a snow monster.
157	5	"Squidward's School for Grown-Ups"	Alan Smart	Written by : Aaron Springer, Sean Charmatz, and Richard Pursel; Storyboarded by : Aaron Springer and Sean Charmatz (directors)	June 4, 2011	268–809	5.02
157	5	"Oral Report"	Alan Smart	Written by : Casey Alexander, Zeus Cervas, and Dani Michaeli; Storyboarded by : Casey Alexander and Zeus Cervas (directors)	March 26, 2011	268–811	4.55
"Squidward's School for Grown-Ups": When Patrick suddenly grows a beard, he decides it is time for him to act like a grown-up. He tags along with Squidward, who offers to teach him everything he knows about how to be mature, much to SpongeBob's dismay. When at an opera house, SpongeBob, disguised as a performer, performs a Wagner-style aria in an attempt to win his friend back. Patrick's beard is revealed to be a sea urchin, and he becomes friends with SpongeBob again, much to the disgust of Squidward, who tries to protest but is booed and attacked by the audiences. "Oral Report": While preparing to give an oral report for boating school, SpongeBob comes down with stage fright. SpongeBob asks Sandy for help, and receives a pair of goggles that enable him to see people in their undergarments so he will not feel nervous. However, during his oral presentation, the goggles malfunction, and SpongeBob runs out of school in panic, taking a boatmobile with him. He ends up giving his oral report to two police officers.
158	6	"Sweet and Sour Squid"	Tom Yasumi	Written by : Aaron Springer and Mr. Lawrence; Storyboarded by : Aaron Springer (director)	July 20, 2011	268–812	3.58
158	6	"The Googly Artiste"	Andrew Overtoom	Written by : Luke Brookshier, Nate Cash, and Derek Iversen; Storyboarded by : Luke Brookshier and Nate Cash (directors)	July 21, 2011	268–810	3.61
"Sweet and Sour Squid": Plankton tries to befriend Squidward in order to get the Krabby Patty secret formula. However, Squidward refuses to converse with him until SpongeBob tells Plankton that he must compliment Squidward's music in order to start a friendship. Plankton can not stand Squidward's clarinet playing, but goes along with it anyway. After Squidward reveals that he doesn't know the formula, Plankton runs off with his clarinet. "The Googly Artiste": When doing arts and crafts with SpongeBob, Patrick is coveted by everyone in town after an art critic praises his artwork. He soon becomes a famous artist, which makes Squidward jealous. When Patrick gets artist's block, he starts gluing googly eyes on Krabby Patties and selling them.
159	7	"A SquarePants Family Vacation"	Andrew Overtoom and Tom Yasumi	Written by : Aaron Springer, Sean Charmatz, and Derek Iversen; Storyboarded by : Aaron Springer and Sean Charmatz (directors)	November 11, 2011 (Note: This episode was first released on the SpongeBob's Runaway Roadtrip DVD on September 20, 2011.)	268–815A	3.57
159	7	"A SquarePants Family Vacation"	Andrew Overtoom and Tom Yasumi	Written by : Aaron Springer, Sean Charmatz, and Derek Iversen; Storyboarded by : Aaron Springer and Sean Charmatz (directors)	November 11, 2011	268–815B	3.57
SpongeBob invites Mr. Krabs, Pearl, Sandy, Mrs. Puff, Larry, Squidward, and Plankton to watch a slideshow of his family vacation to the Great Barrier Reef. In the slideshow, SpongeBob, his parents, and Patrick go on a road trip.
160	8	"Patrick's Staycation"	Andrew Overtoom	Written by : Luke Brookshier, Nate Cash, Sean Charmatz, and Dani Michaeli; Storyboarded by : Luke Brookshier, Nate Cash, and Sean Charmatz (directors)	November 8, 2011	268–813	3.01
160	8	"Walking the Plankton"	Alan Smart	Written by : Casey Alexander, Zeus Cervas, and Mr. Lawrence; Storyboarded by : Casey Alexander and Zeus Cervas (directors)	November 7, 2011	268–816	2.97
"Patrick's Staycation": Patrick wants to take a vacation, so SpongeBob comes up with a solution — a "staycation", a vacation at home — which delights Patrick. "Walking the Plankton": Mr. Krabs and SpongeBob win free tickets to a cruise, thanks to Plankton, but they do not know that it is a secret plan to steal the Krabby Patty formula. At the same time, Plankton tricks his computer wife Karen for a vacation, and she is initially excited until she realizes that this is part of his plan to steal the formula. They both hop on the same cruise as Mr. Krabs and SpongeBob.
161	9	"Mooncation"	Alan Smart	Written by : Sean Charmatz, Vincent Waller, Steven Banks; Storyboarded by : Sean Charmatz and Vincent Waller (directors)	November 10, 2011	268–818	2.83
161	9	"Mr. Krabs Takes a Vacation"	Tom Yasumi	Written by : Luke Brookshier, Marc Ceccarelli, Sean Charmatz, and Steven Banks; Storyboarded by : Luke Brookshier, Marc Ceccarelli, and Sean Charmatz (directors)	November 9, 2011	268–817	3.14
"Mooncation": Sandy prepares her rocket to go to the Moon for a vacation. However, SpongeBob accidentally stows away, and when on the Moon, the two set out camp. SpongeBob and Sandy play sports, including sandboarding on its craters. After accidentally crashing the sandboard into the fuel tank, they rush to return home before the fuel runs out. "Mr. Krabs Takes a Vacation": Mr. Krabs takes a vacation with SpongeBob and Pearl to the Bikini Bottom Mint. However, Pearl does not want to tag along, so she stays at a destroyed museum. When two bank robbers seize the mint, SpongeBob and Mr. Krabs stop them and are rewarded with a special edition one-dollar bill with their faces on it. Pearl confiscates the money and spends it on a new pair of shoes, much to Mr. Krabs's dismay.
162	10	"Ghoul Fools"	Andrew Overtoom and Tom Yasumi	Written by : Luke Brookshier, Marc Ceccarelli, and Derek Iversen; Storyboarded by : Luke Brookshier and Marc Ceccarelli (directors)	October 21, 2011	268–819	3.91
162	10	"Ghoul Fools"	Andrew Overtoom and Tom Yasumi	Written by : Luke Brookshier, Marc Ceccarelli, and Derek Iversen; Storyboarded by : Luke Brookshier and Marc Ceccarelli (directors)	October 21, 2011	268–820	3.91
SpongeBob and Patrick find a houseboat haunted by a crew of ghost pirates. The two get caught in a feud between them and the Flying Dutchman.
163	11	"Mermaid Man Begins"	Alan Smart	Written by : Casey Alexander, Zeus Cervas, Sean Charmatz, and Richard Pursel; Storyboarded by : Casey Alexander, Zeus Cervas, and Sean Charmatz (directors)	September 23, 2011	268–822	2.65
163	11	"Plankton's Good Eye"	Tom Yasumi	Written by : Luke Brookshier, Marc Cecarrelli, and Derek Iversen; Storyboarded by : Luke Brookshier and Marc Ceccarelli (directors)	September 23, 2011	268–825	2.65
"Mermaid Man Begins": SpongeBob and Patrick learn the secret origins of Mermaid Man and Barnacle Boy from the heroes themselves. "Plankton's Good Eye": Plankton grows himself another eye because he lacks depth perception. However, it changes his personality and causes him to be nice, because the eye is from SpongeBob's DNA.
164	12	"Barnacle Face"	Andrew Overtoom	Written by : Aaron Springer, Andrew Goodman, and Dani Michaeli; Storyboarded by : Aaron Springer (director)	September 16, 2011	268–821	4.39
164	12	"Pet Sitter Pat"	Tom Yasumi	Written by : Casey Alexander, Zeus Cervas, and Richard Pursel; Storyboarded by : Casey Alexander and Zeus Cervas (directors)	September 16, 2011	268–835	4.39
"Barnacle Face": The night before a school dance, Pearl gets a barnacle on her face. Mr. Krabs asks SpongeBob to help his daughter remove the blemish to save money, instead of taking Pearl to expensive treatment. "Pet Sitter Pat": When SpongeBob gets an invitation to his grandma's birthday party, he asks Patrick to pet-sit Gary. However, SpongeBob gets worried about Patrick's misguided attempts at pet-sitting.
165	13	"House Sittin' for Sandy"	Alan Smart	Written by : Aaron Springer, Sean Charmatz, and Derek Iversen; Storyboarded by : Aaron Springer (director)	September 30, 2011	268–823	3.33
165	13	"Smoothe Jazz at Bikini Bottom"	Andrew Overtoom	Written by : Casey Alexander, Zeus Cervas, and Richard Pursel; Storyboarded by : Casey Alexander and Zeus Cervas (directors)	September 30, 2011	268–826	3.33
"House Sittin' for Sandy": SpongeBob gladly accepts to house sit Sandy's treedome while she is away. All is quiet until Patrick arrives for a visit and causes chaos, which results in the treedome getting destroyed. "Smoothe Jazz at Bikini Bottom": Squidward and SpongeBob win backstage passes and tickets to Kelpy G's live concert. However, Patrick eats their passes shortly after the concert begins. Losing their passes, SpongeBob and Squidward try to sneak backstage to meet Kelpy G.
166	14	"Bubble Troubles"	Andrew Overtoom	Written by : Luke Brookshier, Marc Ceccarelli, and Derek Iversen; Storyboarded by : Luke Brookshier and Marc Ceccarelli (directors)	November 25, 2011	268–829	3.28
166	14	"The Way of the Sponge"	Tom Yasumi	Written by : Casey Alexander, Zeus Cervas, Derek Iversen, and Andrew Goodman; Storyboarded by : Casey Alexander and Zeus Cervas (directors)	November 25, 2011	268–830	3.28
"Bubble Troubles": After making bubbles with hot sauce, SpongeBob and Patrick accidentally destroy Sandy's air supply by causing a fire and filling her treedome with water. The two must help an increasingly delirious Sandy find enough oxygen until they can make her treedome safe again. "The Way of the Sponge": Sandy introduces Fuzzy Acorns, "the greatest karate master ever," to SpongeBob. Fuzzy trains Sandy to earn the "blacker belt," the highest belt in karate. SpongeBob wishes he had a belt, which Fuzzy overhears and tells SpongeBob that if he wants one, he has to earn it. While working at the Krusty Krab, SpongeBob accidentally beats Fuzzy in a karate match and earns a belt.
167	15	"The Krabby Patty That Ate Bikini Bottom"	Alan Smart	Written by : Aaron Springer and Dani Michaeli; Storyboarded by : Aaron Springer (director)	November 25, 2011	268–828	3.27
167	15	"Bubble Buddy Returns"	Alan Smart	Written by : Luke Brookshier, Marc Ceccarelli, and Mr. Lawrence; Storyboarded by : Luke Brookshier and Marc Ceccarelli (directors)	November 25, 2011	268–824	3.27
"The Krabby Patty That Ate Bikini Bottom": While looking for spare change, Mr. Krabs notices an oversized soybean at Sandy's treedome. Mr. Krabs is interested in what could have enlarged the plant, and Sandy reveals an experimental growth formula, which Mr. Krabs steals. At the Krusty Krab, he uses the growth formula on a Krabby Patty, but it keeps growing, and SpongeBob must find a way to stop it. "Bubble Buddy Returns": SpongeBob receives a letter from his old friend Bubble Buddy, asking to babysit his son Shiny. Shiny causes trouble and SpongeBob struggles to keep him out of dangerous situations.
168	16	"Restraining SpongeBob"	Tom Yasumi	Written by : Sean Charmatz, Vincent Waller, and Paul Tibbitt; Storyboarded by : Sean Charmatz and Vincent Waller (directors)	April 2, 2012	268–814A 268–814B	2.04
168	16	"Fiasco!"	Tom Yasumi	Written by : Casey Alexander, Zeus Cervas, and Mr. Lawrence; Storyboarded by : Casey Alexander and Zeus Cervas (directors)	April 5, 2012	268–834	1.69
"Restraining SpongeBob": Squidward has had it with SpongeBob's annoying antics after an accident and issues SpongeBob a restraining order. The restraining order gets in the way of their work at the Krusty Krab, and Patrick is temporarily hired to help out, much to Squidward's dismay. After being victim of Patrick's antics and seeing that he is more annoying that SpongeBob, Squidward decides to forgive SpongeBob and puts Patrick's name in the order instead. "Fiasco!": Squidward discovers a piece of art by an artist named "Fiasco," and Mr. Krabs decides to use it as an attraction to his customers at the Krusty Krab. Plankton steals the art, believing he can reverse engineer the Krabby Patty formula from it, unknowingly causing him to be chased all over Bikini Bottom by the police.
169	17	"Are You Happy Now?"	Andrew Overtoom	Written by : Luke Brookshier, Marc Ceccarelli, and Dani Michaeli; Storyboarded by : Luke Brookshier and Marc Ceccarelli (directors)	March 31, 2012	268–833	4.12
169	17	"Planet of the Jellyfish"	Tom Yasumi	Written by : Luke Brookshier, Marc Ceccarelli, and Mr. Lawrence; Storyboarded by : Luke Brookshier and Marc Ceccarelli (directors)	March 31, 2012	268–827	4.12
"Are You Happy Now?": Squidward does not have a happiest memory, so SpongeBob tries to help him create one. SpongeBob eventually traps Squidward in a box and takes him to the Krusty Krab, where he has prepared him a party with paiper-mache effigies of himself. Squidward sadistically destroys the effigies, claiming that he is happy again. "Planet of the Jellyfish": SpongeBob and Sandy battle an evil jellyfish overlord, who replaces everyone in town with clones. After searching for clues, they figure out that its weakness is mayonnaise.
170	18	"Free Samples"	Andrew Overtoom	Written by : Casey Alexander, Zeus Cervas, and Dani Michaeli; Storyboarded by : Casey Alexander and Zeus Cervas (directors)	April 6, 2012	268–839	1.67
170	18	"Home Sweet Rubble"	Andrew Overtoom	Written by : Casey Alexander, Zeus Cervas, and Richard Pursel; Storyboarded by : Casey Alexander and Zeus Cervas (directors)	April 4, 2012	268–843	2.40
"Free Samples": Plotting to ruin Mr. Krabs, Plankton drives away his customers with fake Krabby Patty samples. As a result, Mr. Krabs is forced to give out free Krabby Patties in order to try to win them back. "Home Sweet Rubble": SpongeBob's pineapple house is falling apart and needs repairs, so he gets all of his friends to help him refurbish it. However, despite the big changes, SpongeBob is not happy with his new home. He gets an identical copy of his old house after opening a "fully furnished pineapple in a can" from Gary.
171	19	"Karen 2.0"	Alan Smart	Written by : Casey Alexander, Zeus Cervas, and Richard Pursel; Storyboarded by : Casey Alexander and Zeus Cervas (directors)	April 13, 2012	268–846	2.25
171	19	"InSPONGEiac"	Alan Smart	Written by : Casey Alexander, Zeus Cervas, and Mr. Lawrence; Storyboarded by : Casey Alexander and Zeus Cervas (directors)	April 9, 2012	268–837	2.02
"Karen 2.0": When Plankton replaces his computer wife Karen with an upgraded version, the original Karen leaves and gets a job at the Krusty Krab. "InSPONGEiac": After Mr. Krabs convinces him into thinking he has insomnia, SpongeBob starts to have difficulty falling asleep, and consults Patrick for help.
172	20	"Face Freeze!"	Andrew Overtoom	Written by : Casey Alexander, Zeus Cervas, and Mr. Lawrence; Storyboarded by : Casey Alexander and Zeus Cervas (directors)	July 21, 2012	268–848	3.65
172	20	"Glove World R.I.P."	Tom Yasumi	Written by : Aaron Springer and Dani Michaeli; Storyboarded by : Aaron Springer (director)	April 3, 2012	268–844	2.71
"Face Freeze!": SpongeBob and Patrick get face freeze after making too many faces, despite being warned not to by Mr. Krabs. "Glove World R.I.P.": SpongeBob and Patrick spend a final day at the Glove World Amusement Park before it shuts down forever, only to realize that the closure was to open the new Glove Universe Amusement Park.
173	21	"Squiditis"	Tom Yasumi	Written by : Aaron Springer and Derek Iversen; Storyboarded by : Aaron Springer (director)	April 11, 2012	268–849	2.27
173	21	"Demolition Doofus"	Alan Smart	Written by : Luke Brookshier, Marc Ceccarelli, and Derek Iversen; Storyboarded by : Luke Brookshier and Marc Ceccarelli (directors)	July 21, 2012	268–845	3.65
"Squiditis": When Squidward goes home sick with a fake illness, SpongeBob thinks he has caught it for real. "Demolition Doofus": After being hospitalized from the aftermath of her boating lesson, Mrs. Puff enters SpongeBob into a demolition derby in an attempt to dispose of him, but SpongeBob's awful driving makes him a superstar.
174	22	"Treats!"	Alan Smart	Written by : Aaron Springer and Dani Michaeli; Storyboarded by : Aaron Springer (director)	April 10, 2012	268–847	2.15
174	22	"For Here or to Go"	Andrew Overtoom	Written by : Luke Brookshier, Marc Ceccarelli, and Steven Banks; Storyboarded by : Luke Brookshier and Marc Ceccarelli (directors)	April 12, 2012	268–840	2.52
"Treats!": SpongeBob brings home a box of new snail treats that Gary will do anything to get; especially when they run out. "For Here or to Go": Mr. Krabs organizes a guessing game to his customers at the Krusty Krab for a Krabby Patty. When Plankton tries it, he gets the right answer, and Mr. Krabs and SpongeBob stall the contest to prevent him from getting his prize.
175	23	"It's a SpongeBob Christmas!"	Mark Caballero and Seamus Walsh	Written by : Luke Brookshier, Marc Ceccarelli, Derek Iversen, and Mr. Lawrence; Storyboarded by : Luke Brookshier and Marc Ceccarelli (directors)	November 23, 2012 (Note: This episode was first released in It's a Spongebob Christmas! DVD on November 6, 2012.)	268–841	3.63; 4.61
175	23	"It's a SpongeBob Christmas!"	Mark Caballero and Seamus Walsh	Written by : Luke Brookshier, Marc Ceccarelli, Derek Iversen, and Mr. Lawrence; Storyboarded by : Luke Brookshier and Marc Ceccarelli (directors)	November 23, 2012	268–842	3.63; 4.61
In this special stop-motion episode, Plankton turns everybody in Bikini Bottom from nice to naughty by feeding them his special jerktonium-laced fruitcakes and transforming them into jerks in his attempt to get his Christmas wish — the Krabby Patty secret formula. However, when it is revealed that the only victim capable of surviving the mineral is SpongeBob because of his massive love for the holidays, SpongeBob must save the rest of Bikini Bottom from getting coal for Christmas.
176	24	"Super Evil Aquatic Villain Team Up is Go!"	Alan Smart	Written by : Aaron Springer and Dani Michaeli; Storyboarded by : Aaron Springer (director)	October 14, 2012	268–836	2.28
176	24	"Chum Fricassee"	Tom Yasumi	Written by : Casey Alexander, Zeus Cervas, and Richard Pursel; Storyboarded by : Casey Alexander and Zeus Cervas (directors)	October 21, 2012	268–850	2.30
"Super Evil Aquatic Villain Team Up is Go!": Plankton teams up with Man Ray to get the Krabby Patty formula and rule the world. However, his plan backfires when Man Ray becomes addicted to Krabby Patties. "Chum Fricassee": Squidward quits the Krusty Krab to work for Plankton, turning the Chum Bucket into an overnight success.
177	25	"The Good Krabby Name"	Alan Smart	Written by : Luke Brookshier, Marc Ceccarelli, and Derek Iversen; Storyboarded by : Luke Brookshier and Marc Ceccarelli (directors)	September 3, 2012	268–851	3.36
177	25	"Move It or Lose It"	Andrew Overtoom	Written by : Casey Alexander, Zeus Cervas, and Mr. Lawrence; Storyboarded by : Casey Alexander and Zeus Cervas (directors)	October 21, 2012	268–838	2.30
"The Good Krabby Name": Mr. Krabs wants all of Bikini Bottom to eat at the Krusty Krab, so SpongeBob and Patrick go on an advertising blitz. "Move It or Lose It": Mr. Krabs and Plankton circulate petitions about the bulldozing of a Bikini Bottom restaurant.
178	26	"Hello Bikini Bottom!"	Alan Smart, Andrew Overtoom, and Tom Yasumi	Written by : Aaron Springer, Sean Charmatz, and Dani Michaeli; Storyboarded by : Aaron Springer and Sean Charmatz (directors)	October 8, 2012	268–831	2.76
178	26	"Hello Bikini Bottom!"	Alan Smart, Andrew Overtoom, and Tom Yasumi	Written by : Aaron Springer, Sean Charmatz, and Dani Michaeli; Storyboarded by : Aaron Springer and Sean Charmatz (directors)	October 8, 2012	268–832	2.76
A concert promoter named Colonel Carper wants SpongeBob and Squidward to form a band together and sends them on a "world tour." However, Mr. Krabs decides to manage them in order to make his own profits from his two employees' success.

== DVD release ==
The DVD boxset for season eight was released by Paramount Home Entertainment and Nickelodeon in the United States and Canada on March 12, 2013, three months after the season had completed broadcast on television. The DVD release features bonus materials, including the animated short "Sandy's Vacation in Ruins."

SpongeBob SquarePants: The Complete Eighth Season
Set details			Special features
26 episodes (47 segment episodes); 4-disc set; 1.33:1 aspect ratio; Languages: English (Dolby Digital 2.0)			Sandy's Vacation in Ruins featurette
Release dates			Sandy's Vacation in Ruins featurette
Region 1	Region 2	Region 4	Sandy's Vacation in Ruins featurette
March 12, 2013	October 28, 2013	October 30, 2013	Sandy's Vacation in Ruins featurette
