= SpongeBob's Truth or Square =

2009 made-for-television comedy special

- DVD cover
- Also known as: Stuck in the Freezer
- Based on: SpongeBob SquarePants by Stephen Hillenburg
- Written by: Luke Brookshier; Nate Cash; Steven Banks; Paul Tibbitt
- Directed by: Andrew Overtoom (animation); Alan Smart (animation); Tom Yasumi (animation)
- Starring: Tom Kenny; Bill Fagerbakke; Clancy Brown; Rodger Bumpass; Mr. Lawrence; Jill Talley; Carolyn Lawrence; Paul Tibbitt; P!nk
- Narrated by: Ricky Gervais (uncredited)
- Country of origin: United States
- Original language: English

Production
- Executive producers: Stephen Hillenburg; Paul Tibbitt
- Running time: 59 minutes (Extended/DVD Version); 51-44 minutes (Original)
- Production companies: United Plankton Pictures; Nickelodeon Animation Studio

Original release
- Network: Nickelodeon
- Release: November 6, 2009

SpongeBob's Truth or Square (also known as Stuck in the Freezer) is a 2009 made-for-television comedy film and an hour-long episode of the American animated television series SpongeBob SquarePants that was produced as the 123rd and 124th episodes of the series. The special originally aired on Nickelodeon in the United States on November 6, 2009, celebrating the tenth anniversary of the television series. This is the second SpongeBob SquarePants television film, following SpongeBob's Atlantis SquarePantis (2007). Its animation was directed by supervising director Alan Smart, Andrew Overtoom and Tom Yasumi.

In the special, SpongeBob and his friends are accidentally locked inside the Krusty Krab on the day of its "Eleventy-Seventh" anniversary celebration. As they crawl through the ventilation system trying to escape, they look back on shared memories through flashback moments. Meanwhile, Patchy the Pirate is holding a TV Extravaganza, and is waiting for SpongeBob to show up to it, but with no reply, Patchy sets out to Bikini Bottom in a fit of rage.

Truth or Square was written by Luke Brookshier, Nate Cash, Steven Banks, and Paul Tibbitt. Guest stars include Rosario Dawson, Eddie Deezen, Triumph the Insult Comic Dog, LeBron James, Tina Fey, Will Ferrell, Craig Ferguson, Robin Williams, and P!nk, with Ricky Gervais having an uncredited voice cameo as the narrator. Upon release, the special attracted an estimated 7.7 million viewers, but was met with mixed reviews from critics; although some generally spoke positively of the special's main animated segments, most criticized the Patchy the Pirate segments, which were described as unfunny and filler.

== Plot ==
SpongeBob wakes up one morning and realizes that the Krusty Krab is celebrating its "Eleventy-Seventh" anniversary. He remembers his first visit to the Krusty Krab and tells his pet snail Gary all about it. SpongeBob then leaves to go to the restaurant, but as soon as he exits his house, he bumps into the back of a long line of customers waiting to get inside. SpongeBob jumps on top of every customer in the line, eventually reaching the Krusty Krab.

Mr. Krabs tells SpongeBob and Squidward that the anniversary celebration will be the perfect opportunity for Plankton to steal the Krabby Patty formula. To prevent Plankton from breaking in, Mr. Krabs has hired Patrick Star as a security guard, so he does not have to pay for a real one. SpongeBob spectacularly decorates the Krusty Krab with ketchup, toilet paper, and mustard. When he shows Patrick, Squidward, and Mr. Krabs a Krabby Patty ice sculpture that he made himself, they accidentally trap themselves inside the freezer during an unsuccessful attempt to take the sculpture outside. Mr. Krabs remembers a way out of the freezer through the ventilation system. While finding their way through the maze of air vents, they look back at some memorable moments in their lives.

To get out of the air vents, SpongeBob molds Squidward, Patrick, and Mr. Krabs into a battering ram and breaks out of the shaft, only to find that all the customers have left after waiting too long without getting any food. Mr. Krabs is heartbroken, but SpongeBob manages to summon all the customers back as he sings a song called "O Krusty Krab". Meanwhile, Plankton finds the perfect opportunity to steal the Krabby Patty secret formula, but fails, having been caught by Mr. Krabs. The "Eleventy-Seventh" anniversary celebration then goes ahead.

Throughout the special, Patchy the Pirate attempts to hold a celebration of the tenth anniversary of when he started the SpongeBob fan club, and attempts to bring in SpongeBob himself. When Patchy is told SpongeBob is not coming, he vows to get him by any means necessary. He travels to Bikini Bottom, but ends up getting eaten by a whale. Inside the whale, he watches some old tapes of the show (including a theme song for Squidward, Patrick, and Mr. Krabs) before the whale sneezes him out, sending him flying back to the studio, where he dreams of meeting SpongeBob. He wakes up and decides he will never meet his hero, but his guests assure him otherwise, causing him to faint again.

== Cast ==
Actor/Actress	Character Role
Tom Kenny	SpongeBob SquarePants; Gary the Snail; Harold SquarePants; French Narrator; Patchy the Pirate; Additional voices
Bill Fagerbakke	Patrick Star; Additional voices
Rodger Bumpass	Squidward Tentacles; Security Guard; Additional voices
Clancy Brown	Mr. Krabs
Mr. Lawrence	Sheldon Plankton; Additional voices
Jill Talley	Karen Plankton; Additional voices
Carolyn Lawrence	Sandy Cheeks
Paul Tibbitt	Potty the Parrot; Patchy's good and bad sides
P!nk	Herself
Dave Allen	Abraham Lincoln (credited as "The Guy on the Penny")
Gregg Turkington	Camera Operator
Bob Joles	Painty the Pirate

== Production ==
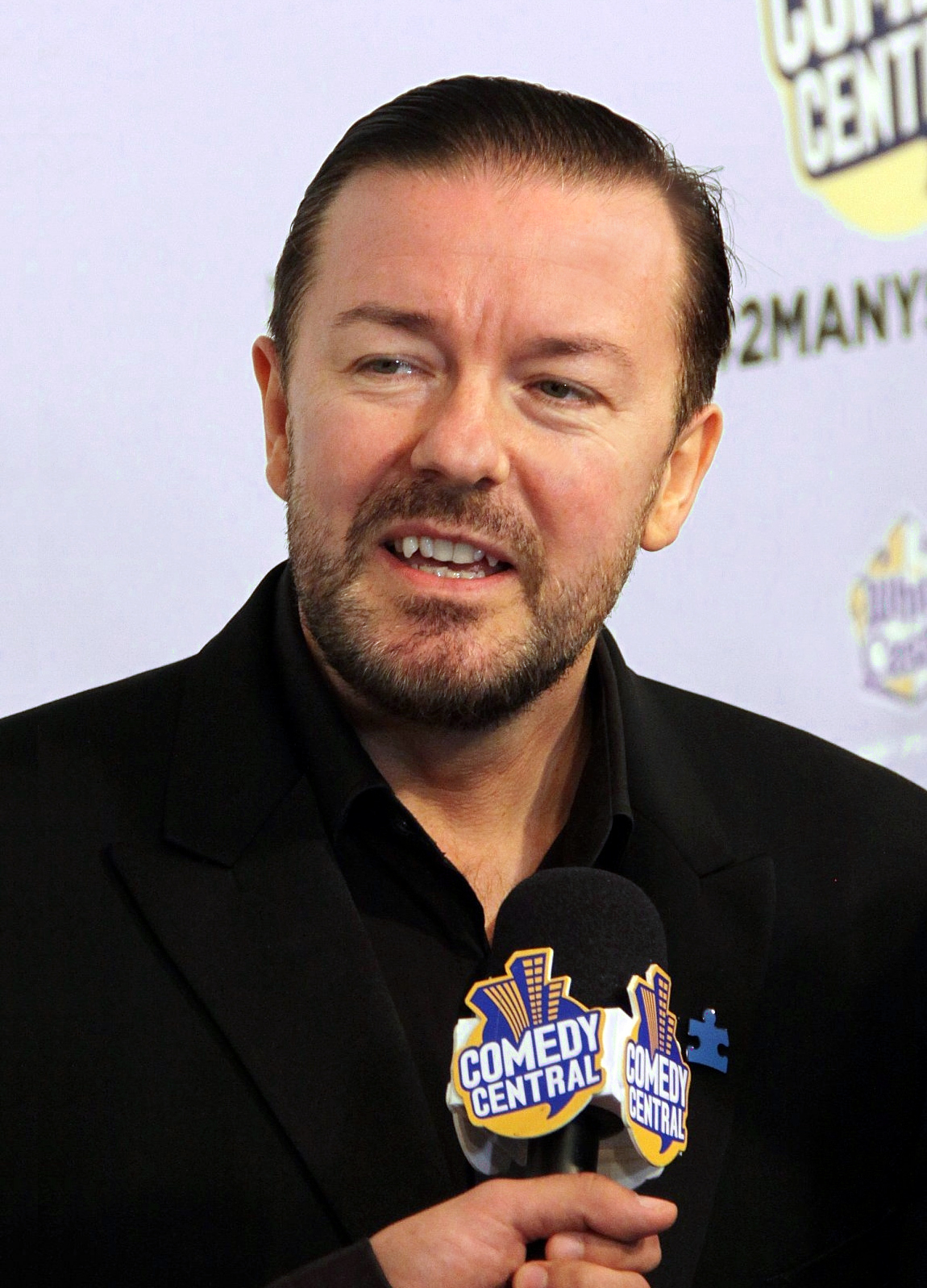
Ricky Gervais narrated the special uncredited.

Production began and ended in 2009.

=== Writing and music ===
Truth or Square was written by Luke Brookshier, Nate Cash, Steven Banks, and Paul Tibbitt. The writers have described the television movie as "Seinfeld-esque" that parodies the recycled flashback episodes seen in Seinfeld, Friends and other U.S. shows. The featured song, "We've Got Scurvy", was sung by American singer and actress P!nk.

=== Cast ===
Truth or Square stars most of the series' main cast members including Tom Kenny, Bill Fagerbakke, Rodger Bumpass, Clancy Brown, Mr. Lawrence, Jill Talley, and Carolyn Lawrence (Mary Jo Catlett and Lori Alan's characters both appear, but they do not speak). In addition to the series' cast, it features Rosario Dawson, Eddie Deezen, Craig Ferguson, Will Ferrell, Tina Fey, LeBron James, Triumph the Insult Comic Dog (Robert Smigel), and Robin Williams as guest actors appearing as themselves in the live-action sequences, while Ricky Gervais provided an uncredited vocal cameo as the narrator. Nickelodeon animation president Brown Johnson said "Over the past decade, SpongeBob has become one of the most beloved characters in television history[...] And we're excited to cap off the year's celebration with this star-studded special anniversary event."

=== Directing and animating ===
Andrew Overtoom, supervising director, Alan Smart, and Tom Yasumi served as the special's animation directors while Luke Brookshier and Nate Cash handled the storyboard direction. This was the first episode of the series to be produced in 16:9 widescreen, this would later be used in "It's a SpongeBob Christmas!" from the eighth season before permanently switching over in the ninth season. It was a part of the series' tenth anniversary celebration.

The title sequence of SpongeBob for the special was made exclusively for the series' tenth anniversary. It was animated in stop-motion animation, with Cee Lo Green performing the theme. Mark Caballero, Seamus Walsh and Chris Finnegan of Screen Novelties animated its opening titles. Finnegan claimed that the crew were "thrill[ed]" to do the title sequence because "the original title sequence is so recognizable and everyone seen it over and over and it's so great in its own way". Executive producer and the episode's writer Paul Tibbitt said "We don't just want to redraw it [the original title sequence], we want it to be something special and different[...] So we thought we would do it in three dimensions[...]" Nickelodeon animation president Brown Johnson lauded the new title sequence and said it is "SO great!" Some traditional animation on scraps of brown paper are intermixed into the stop-motion.

Tibbitt said that the "biggest surprise" for him in the new title sequence was "the treatment of Painty the Pirate in the beginning" as seen in a fortune-teller machine. Mark Caballero, one of its animators, explained "our idea was like our goal is like the more disturbing, the better because I don't think there is a fortune telling machine out there that doesn't disturb when you see it. Tibbitt said "it was a great idea[...] I was just expecting maybe a 3D version of the painting but we got something totally different and it's very cool."

== Release ==
In a press release, Nickelodeon officially announced the special "event" on October 13, 2009. According to the network, the special includes "SpongeBob's first visit to the Krusty Krab as a baby, a vintage Krusty Krab TV commercial, how SpongeBob found his beloved pineapple house, and the time that SpongeBob and Sandy got married!" Prior to the official announcement of the television special, Entertainment Weekly broke the news by releasing a clip featuring a scene where SpongeBob and Sandy get married.

It originally aired on Nickelodeon in the United States on November 6, 2009, as one of many SpongeBob TV events to air that year (with April featuring "SpongeBob vs. The Big One", and July featuring "The Ultimate SpongeBob SpongeBash" marathon, Square Roots: The Story of SpongeBob SquarePants documentary, and twelve new episodes).

=== Marketing ===
In late 2009, Burger King released tie-in toys based on the episode, featuring the characters in block shapes.

A book adaptation of the special, titled The Great Escape!, was also released. The book was written by Emily Sollinger, published by Simon Spotlight/Nickelodeon, and was released on September 8, 2009. Another tie-in book to the special was also released. The book titled Good Times! was written by Erica David, illustrated by the Artifacts Group, and published by Simon Spotlight/Nickelodeon. Good Times! was first released on September 8, 2009, then re-released in 2011.

On November 10, 2009, it was released on a DVD compilation of the same name in the United States and Canada, on November 16, 2009, in region 2, and on October 29, 2009, in region 4. The DVD consists of five season six episodes, a short called Behind the Scenes of the SpongeBob Opening, and karaoke-mode songs: "F.U.N.", "Campfire Song", and "We've Got Scurvy". It was also released in the series' season six DVD compilation. On June 4, 2019, "Truth or Square" was released on the SpongeBob SquarePants: The Next 100 Episodes DVD, alongside all the episodes of seasons six through nine. On April 28, 2020, "Truth or Square" was released on the SpongeBob SquarePants: Bikini Bottom Bash DVD.

== Reception ==
=== Ratings ===
The premiere of Truth or Square on Friday, November 6 drew 7.7 million total viewers, ranking as basic cable's number-one entertainment show for the week. It was also ranked as the week's number one program among children in the demographic groups ages 6–11 and 2–11.

=== Critical response ===
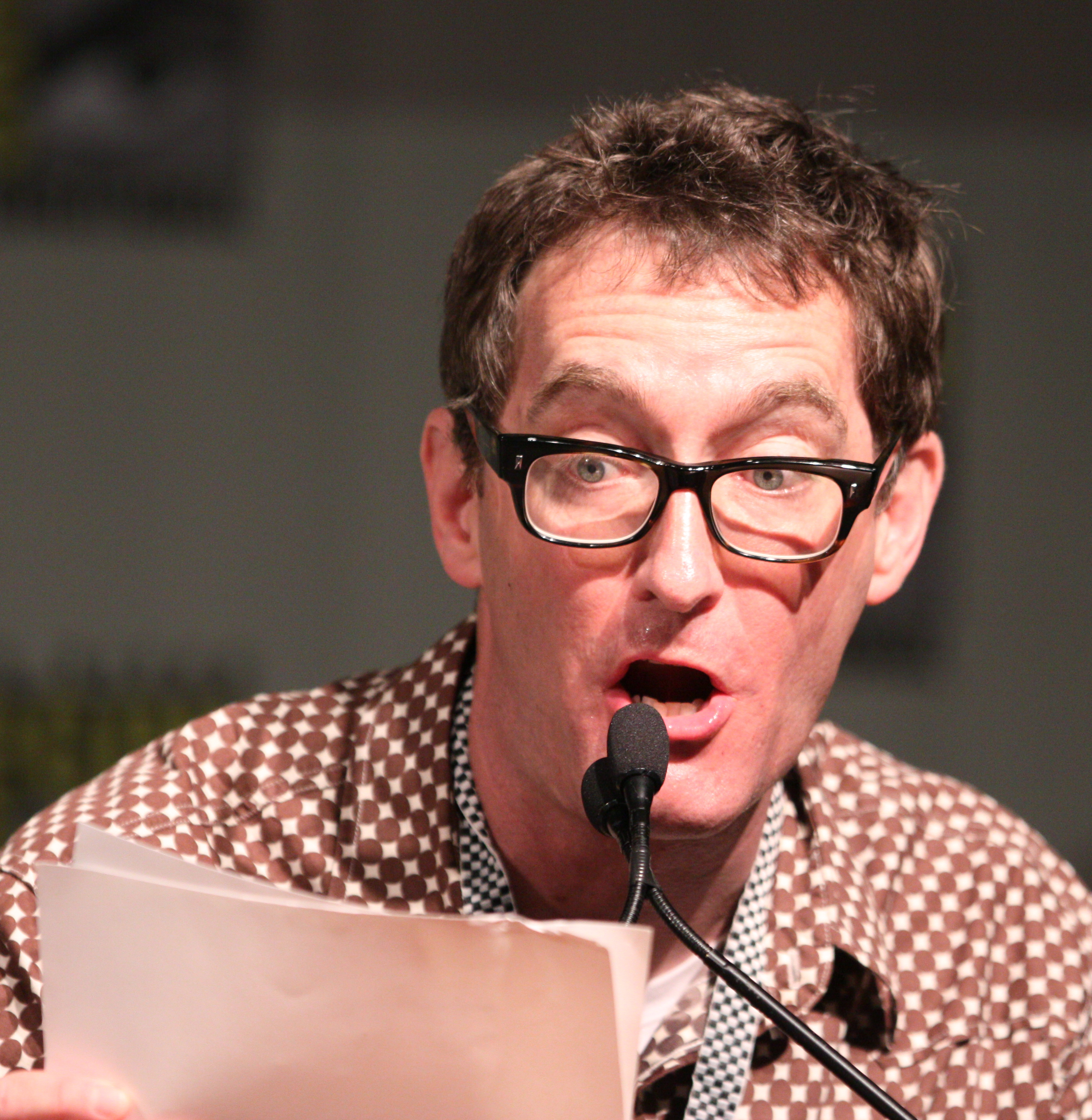
Tom Kenny was awarded at the 37th Annie Awards for his performance as the voice of the titular character.

Truth or Square received generally polarized reviews from critics and fans, and was criticized mainly due to the Patchy the Pirate segments, with many comparing them to the segments from "Christmas Who", "The Sponge Who Could Fly", and "Ugh". Paul Mavis from DVD Talk said "Truth or Square is a strange mix of some truly memorable animated SpongeBob moments interrupted unfortunately by the largely unfunny Patchy the Pirate segments." He added "All of those amusing moments in Truth or Square, along with the Charlie Brown Christmas ending, make one forget the patchy Patchy segments in Truth or Square." Roy Hrab of DVD Verdict gave the episode a negative review saying "Wow... This is without a doubt the lamest SpongeBob episode I have ever seen[...] In fact, nothing interesting happens at all. The Patchy interludes and reliance on cameos merely draws attention to the episode's lack of substance."

Nancy Basile of the About.com praised the special and wrote, "I had doubts that the recent Truth or Square special of SpongeBob SquarePants would be funny or clever. I was quite wrong." She added that "My kids and I were mesmerized." Jose Strike of the Animation World Network positively reacted to the special and wrote "Truth or Square is a major treat; in fact, I'm so happy I think I'll drop on the deck and flop like a fish..." Ian Jane of DVD Talk said "Truth or Square isn't your typical episode, as it mixes up a lot of live action material in with the more traditional animated sequences to very unusual effect." He added "[...]but there's enough here in terms of the gags and the jokes that even if it's not a classic episode, it's still one worth seeing." Nickelodeon animation president Brown Johnson said that the special is her favorite among the series.

In 2010, Tom Kenny won at the 37th Annie Awards for the Best Voice Acting in a Television Production category for his performance as the voice of SpongeBob SquarePants in the special.

=== Retrospective ===
In an October 2023 interview with the Los Angeles Times, Pink expressed regret over performing the "We've Got Scurvy" song used during the special, labeling the song "a real mistake", and stated that she would have not done that retrospectively.

== Video game ==
The video game SpongeBob's Truth or Square that was based on the SpongeBob SquarePants television special was released for PlayStation Portable, Wii, Xbox 360, and Nintendo DS. The game was first announced by THQ on May 21, 2009, and was originally titled SpongeBob SquarePants: Happiness Squared before being changed early in development. It was published by THQ, developed by Heavy Iron Studios, and was released on October 26, 2009, in North America.

== See also ==
- SpongeBob's Big Birthday Blowout
