= To SquarePants or Not to SquarePants =

- SpongeBob SquarePants episode
- Title card
- Episode no.: Season 6 Episode 16b
- Directed by: Alan Smart (animation and supervising); Luke Brookshier (storyboard); Nate Cash (storyboard)
- Written by: Luke Brookshier; Nate Cash; Steven Banks
- Production code: 193-634
- Original air date: July 17, 2009

Episode chronology
← Previous "Squid's Visit"	Next → "Shuffleboarding"
- SpongeBob SquarePants (season 6)

"To SquarePants or Not to SquarePants", also known as "SpongeBob RoundPants", is an episode from the American animated television series SpongeBob SquarePants, acting as the second half of the 16th episode of the sixth season, and the 116th episode overall. It first aired on Nickelodeon in the United States on July 17, 2009, and was written by Luke Brookshier, Nate Cash and Steven Banks.

In the episode, SpongeBob accidentally shrinks his pants in the clothes dryer and after being unable to find a new pair, tries on some round pants, which causes people to be unable to recognize him.

The episode's release date of July 17 was chosen due to it coinciding with the tenth anniversary of the series; (Note: July 17, 1999 is considered the series' official, although it technically premiered on May 1, 1999.) upon release, the episode was met with generally mixed reviews.

== Plot ==
The episode begins with the French Narrator recalling the day SpongeBob "changed" his pants, which happened three days ago. It is laundry day, and SpongeBob is drying a whole load of his "square pants". But while all his pants are in the dryer, SpongeBob gets distracted by Patrick who wants SpongeBob to hear him make funny sounds with his tongue for a long time. Eventually, SpongeBob goes to check on his pants which all shrunk in the dryer; he heads to the mall to buy new pairs. Upon hearing there will not be another shipping of "square pants" for months, SpongeBob tries out several different styles of pants at the mall until he finally chooses a pair of "round pants".

SpongeBob wanders around town and Patrick is unable to recognize him because of the new pants. SpongeBob is greeted by Sandy who teases SpongeBob by pretending she does not recognize him and makes comments about his clothes in a good way. Then, SpongeBob walks up to Squidward. Squidward pretends to not know SpongeBob, to get him to leave. SpongeBob heads home, although Patrick does not let him in because the house belongs to SpongeBob SquarePants before he "left".

Feeling discouraged by the idea nobody knows who he is, SpongeBob decides to start a new life as "SpongeBob RoundPants", to which he decides to re-apply to his job at the Krusty Krab. When he meets Squidward at the restaurant, SpongeBob acts as if this is his first time applying at the Krusty Krab and has never met Squidward before. Squidward decides to take advantage of this by training SpongeBob to act like him, a horrible employee, in hopes SpongeBob will later get fired. After a series of complaints from the customers, Mr. Krabs confronts SpongeBob for his lousy work, to which SpongeBob explains since he has new pants, he is no longer "SpongeBob SquarePants". Mr. Krabs then convinces SpongeBob that he should take his pants off then. SpongeBob, no longer wearing pants, then continues to be his normal self and go back to being a good employee. When Sandy comes in seeing SpongeBob in his underwear, however, she (teasingly) calls him "SpongeBob UnderPants". SpongeBob looks at his underwear and screams in horror, ending the episode.

== Production ==
"To SquarePants or Not to SquarePants" was written by Luke Brookshier, Nate Cash, and Steven Banks, and the animation was directed by supervising director, Alan Smart. Brookshier and Cash also functioned as storyboard directors. The episode originally aired on Nickelodeon in the United States on July 17, 2009, with a TV-Y7 parental rating.

The episode was a part of the network's tenth anniversary celebration of SpongeBob SquarePants. Starting July 17, 2009 at 8:00pm EDT, Nickelodeon aired a 50-hour SpongeBob marathon titled "The Ultimate SpongeBob SpongeBash Weekend". The marathon started with the premiere of this episode at 8:00pm.

On July 21, 2009, the episode became available on the DVD compilation of the same name, along with fellow sixth-season episodes "Squid's Visit", "The Splinter", "Slide Whistle Stooges", "Boating Buddies", "The Krabby Kronicle", "The Slumber Party", and "Grooming Gary". "To SquarePants or Not to SquarePants" was also released in the series' season six DVD compilation. On June 4, 2019, "To SquarePants or Not to SquarePants" was released on the SpongeBob SquarePants: The Next 100 Episodes DVD, alongside all the episodes of seasons six through nine.

== Reception ==
The episode and its DVD release received mixed reviews. Paul Mavis of DVD Talk positively responded to the episode and wrote that "There are laughs in 'To SquarePants or Not to SquarePants.'" Gordon Sullivan of DVD Verdict gave the episode a score of 5 out of 10 and said "[the episode] was one of the slighter entries [on the DVD], with the core joke being fairly well-handled with no one recognizing SpongeBob, but it went on just a little too long. Many fans have criticized it however due to its plot. April Pohren of the Blogcritics said "[the episode] is original and comical."
