= SpongeBob SquarePants vs. The Big One =

- SpongeBob SquarePants episode
- Promotional artwork for the episode depicting SpongeBob (right), Patrick (middle) and Jack Kahuna Laguna (left) on a surfboard.
- Episode no.: Season 6 Episode 11
- Directed by: Andrew Overtoom (animation); Alan Smart (animation and supervising); Aaron Springer (storyboard); Mike Roth (storyboard artist); Brad Vandergrift (storyboard artist)
- Written by: Aaron Springer; Paul Tibbitt; Steven Banks
- Production code: 193-609/193-610
- Original air date: April 17, 2009 (Note: The episode was first released in SpongeBob Vs. The Big One DVD on March 3, 2009.)

Guest appearances
- Johnny Depp as Jack Kahuna Laguna; Davy Jones as himself; Bruce Brown as the Narrator; Brian Doyle-Murray as The Flying Dutchman

Episode chronology
← Previous "Grooming Gary"	Next → "Porous Pockets"
- SpongeBob SquarePants (season 6)

"SpongeBob SquarePants vs. The Big One", also known as "The Secret of Kahuna Laguna" and "SpongeBob SquarePants and The Big Wave", is the 11th episode of the sixth season and the 111th overall episode of the American animated television series SpongeBob SquarePants. The episode was written by Aaron Springer, who also directed the storyboards, Paul Tibbitt, and Steven Banks, and the animation was directed by Andrew Overtoom and supervising director Alan Smart. The episode was a part of the series' tenth anniversary celebration in 2009, and features guest appearances by Johnny Depp as the voice of Jack Kahuna Laguna, Bruce Brown as the narrator, and Davy Jones as himself. It originally aired on Nickelodeon in the United States on April 17, 2009.

The series follows the adventures and endeavors of the title character and his various friends in the underwater city of Bikini Bottom. In this episode, SpongeBob and his friends — Patrick, Squidward, Mr. Krabs, and Sandy — are swept away by a giant wave. They get separated from each other; SpongeBob, Patrick, and Squidward find themselves stranded on a remote tropical island. To get back home to Bikini Bottom, they search for Jack Kahuna Laguna, a surf guru who can teach them the surf moves needed to hit the elusive wave, The Big One, in order to return home.

Upon premiere, the episode pulled an average of 5.8 million viewers and received positive reviews. On March 3, 2009, the DVD and the video game based on the episode were released simultaneously.

== Plot summary ==
Mr. Krabs discovers a lot of people are visiting the beach, so he decides to go sell them Krabby Patties. When SpongeBob, Squidward, and Mr. Krabs are on a surfboard, they meet up with Patrick and Sandy. Patrick tries to climb onto the board, but he causes it to tip and collide with a large wave. It sweeps the five friends up into separate places: SpongeBob, Patrick, and Squidward go to an island with young surfers; Mr. Krabs ends up stranded in the middle of the sea with his cash register and encounters the Flying Dutchman, and Sandy is taken to a small island where she builds a helicopter from the supplies.

The young surfers tell SpongeBob, Patrick, and Squidward that the only way to get back to Bikini Bottom is to surf there; unfortunately, they do not know how to. They unsuccessfully try to learn, mostly due to their incompetence. Twitch, one of the surfers, tells them that there is one person who can possibly teach them how to surf: Jack Kahuna Laguna (JKL). After they find JKL, he comes out of his hut and surfs on an enormous surfboard, which astonishes the three. He later says that they have to ride a wave called "The Big One" to get back home, or else they'll be trapped on the island forever. They practice surfing for some time, then get ready to ride "The Big One". Before they set off, JKL announces that the Big One demands a sacrifice.

SpongeBob, Patrick, and Squidward ride the wave, which comes to life and eats Patrick's and Squidward's surfboards, and they see Mr. Krabs. He is rescued by JKL, but drops his cash register into the ocean, so JKL goes to retrieve it and acts as the sacrifice. SpongeBob, Patrick, Squidward, and Mr. Krabs surf on the Big One and approach Goo Lagoon. Sandy's helicopter also crash-lands in Goo Lagoon where people mistaken her for a spaceman before Sandy clears up the misunderstanding. After SpongeBob and his friends are finally back together, a welcome home party is held for the gang, with Twitch and the surfers performing at the party. JKL is also shown to have survived and gives Krabs his cash register back. The episode ends with everyone dancing on the beach.

== Production ==
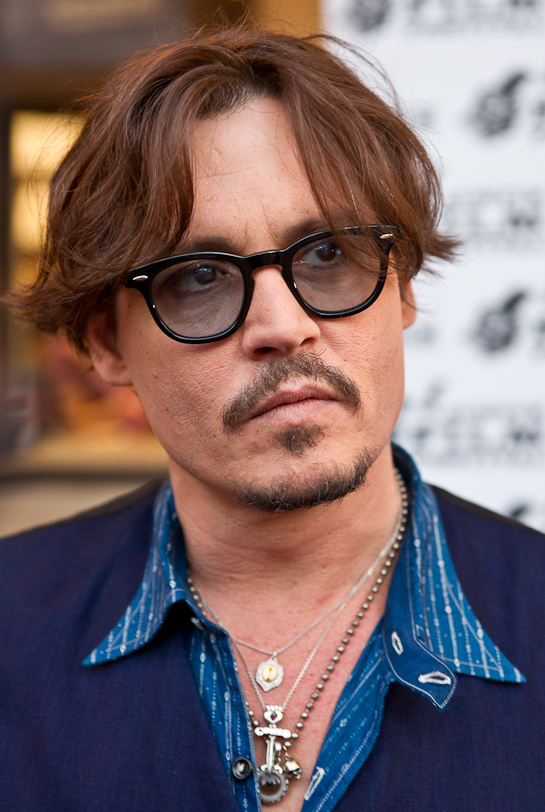
Actor Johnny Depp, shown here in 2011, guest-starred in the episode as Jack Kahuna Laguna, among others.

The episode "SpongeBob SquarePants vs. The Big One" was written by Aaron Springer, Paul Tibbitt, and Steven Banks. Andrew Overtoom and supervising director, Alan Smart served as animation directors, and Springer worked as storyboard director. The episode originally aired on Nickelodeon in the United States on April 17, 2009, as part of the series' tenth anniversary celebration. During its release, it was also simulcast on Nickelodeon Mobile. TurboNick, the online broadband player of Nickelodeon, also featured a sneak peek of the episode, short form video content, episodes of SpongeBob SquarePants and an instant replay following its on-air premiere.

In addition to the regular cast, American actor and musician Johnny Depp guest starred in the episode as the voice of Jack Kahuna Laguna, a surf guru that taught SpongeBob how to surf. According to Sarah Noonan, vice president of talent and casting for Nickelodeon, Depp accepted the role because he and his kids are fans of the show. Nickelodeon animation president Brown Johnson said "We're excited to have Johnny Depp guest star on the SpongeBob TV special that kicks off the series 10th anniversary celebration[...] This is a big year for our porous pal, and some of the biggest celebrities are helping us honor him in a special way throughout the year." Other guests included British musician and The Monkees' Davy Jones who starred in the episode as himself, appearing at the bottom of the sea with his locker, and Bruce Brown providing vocal cameo as the episode's narrator. "Daydream Believer" by The Monkees is featured as the closing theme during the credits.

On March 3, 2009, the episode became available on a DVD compilation of the same name by Nickelodeon and Paramount Home Entertainment. It was also released in the series' season six DVD compilation. On June 4, 2019, "SpongeBob SquarePants vs. The Big One" was released on the SpongeBob SquarePants: The Next 100 Episodes DVD, alongside all the episodes of seasons six through nine.

== Reception ==
The premiere of the episode on April 17, 2009, drew an estimated 5.8 million viewers, and was 1.6 million higher than the highest-rated SpongeBob of the previous week, which aired April 11. The episode was Nickelodeon's fifth highest-rated telecast in total viewers so far that year and garnered significant ratings increases among all kid and tween demographics.

The episode received mostly positive reviews. Carey Bryson of the About.com said that "parents will also be pleased, as the episode contains no rude words or inappropriate jokes." In his review for the Blogcritics, Maddy Pumilia wrote "Like most SpongeBob episodes, this episode was comic genius. I especially enjoyed Mr. Krabs' love affair with his cash register, Cashy. It's hilarious. Best part of the show, in my opinion." Ian Jane of DVD Talk said "[the episode] is absolutely worth a watch thanks to the series high standard of quality, quirky animation, and multilayered humor." Erich Asperschlager of DVD Verdict called the episode "a fun take on beach bunny surf fare, and is backed by a decent sextet of recent SpongeBob adventures." David Hinckly of the New York Daily News gave the episode 4/5 stars and said "It's all good when you never forget to have fun." The Daily Mirror described the vocal appearance of Johnny Depp as "totally wavelicious (or something)." LJ Perez of News Observer said that the character of Johnny Depp "looks more like Patrick Swayze's surfing bank robber from the so-bad-it's-good movie 'Point Break' than he does any character Depp has ever portrayed."

In 2010, the episode was nominated at the Golden Reel Awards for Best Sound Editing: Television Animation. It has also been nominated at the 37th Annie Awards for Best Home Entertainment Production for its DVD release.

The DVD received mostly positive reviews. In his review from TV Shows on DVD, Gord Lacey said that the video quality is "fairly good" and the audio was "decent, but the surround track from earlier releases is better." Danny Cox of Inside Pulse said that the full screen format "look very good" and "Dolby Digital Stereo Sound and also come through sounding great."

== Merchandise ==
SpongeBob vs. The Big One: Beach Party Cook-Off, a video game based on the episode, was released for Nintendo DS. The game was published by THQ, and was released on March 3, 2009. A book based on the episode was also released in 2009. The book titled Surf's Up, SpongeBob! was written by David Lewman, and was published by Simon Spotlight/Nickelodeon.
