= Square Roots: The Story of SpongeBob SquarePants =

2009 documentary about SpongeBob SquarePants

- Also known as: Square Roots
- Written by: Patrick Creadon; Christine O'Malley
- Directed by: Patrick Creadon
- Music by: John Powell

Production
- Producer: Theodore James
- Cinematography: Patrick Creadon; Robert F. Smith
- Editors: Derek Boonstra; Alex Calleros; Miranda Yousef
- Running time: approximately 45 minutes

Original release
- Network: VH1
- Release: July 14, 2009

Square Roots: The Story of SpongeBob SquarePants is a 2009 American documentary film directed and co-written by Patrick Creadon. The special was released on VH1 on July 14, 2009, and July 23, 2009, on Nick at Nite. It was also included on SpongeBob SquarePants: The First 100 Episodes DVD released in North America on September 22, 2009. The documentary chronicles the popular culture success of the animated television series SpongeBob SquarePants. It features commentaries from series creator Stephen Hillenburg and celebrity fans.

== Synopsis ==
Square Roots: The Story of SpongeBob SquarePants focuses on the American animated television series SpongeBob SquarePants and its immersion into global popular culture. The film documents the show's early inspirations, and its origins. Among the millions of fans are celebrities such as LeBron James and Ricky Gervais, who express their insights for the show and its title character, SpongeBob. It also features the series' impact on the US President Barack Obama, the inmates of San Quentin State Prison, and fans around the world.

== Cast ==
- Alec Baldwin as himself
- Jerry Beck as himself
- Ernest Borgnine as himself
- Luke Brookshier as himself
- Clancy Brown as himself
- Rodger Bumpass as himself
- Nate Cash as himself
- Tim Conway as himself
- Rosario Dawson as herself
- Bill Fagerbakke as himself
- Craig Ferguson as himself
- Kristen Ridgway Flores as herself
- Ricky Gervais as himself
- David Hasselhoff as himself
- Albie Hecht as himself
- Stephen Hillenburg as himself
- Derek Iversen as himself
- LeBron James as himself
- Jeffrey Katzenberg as himself
- Tom Kenny as himself, Patchy the Pirate
- Carolyn Lawrence as herself
- Mr. Lawrence as himself
- Scott Mansz as himself
- Dani Michaeli as himself
- Brian Doyle-Murray as himself
- Keke Palmer as herself
- Chris Pine as himself
- Richard Pursel as himself
- Nile Rodgers as himself
- Andrea Romano as herself
- Marion Ross as herself
- Gene Shalit as himself
- Alan Smart as himself
- Steve Spruill as himself
- Robert Thompson as himself
- Paul Tibbitt as himself
- Robert Smigel as Triumph the Insult Comic Dog
- Nikki Vanzo as herself
- Vincent Waller as himself
- Ween as themselves

=== Archive footage ===
- Katie Couric as herself
- Jacques Cousteau as himself
- Simon Cowell as himself
- Whoopi Goldberg as herself
- Barack Obama as himself
- Jon Stewart as himself

== Release ==
Square Roots: The Story of SpongeBob SquarePants was directed by Patrick Creadon. The documentary film originally aired on television on the cable network VH1 in the United States on July 14, 2009. It also aired on Nick at Nite on July 23, 2009, with a TV-PG parental rating. It was first announced in early 2009. On a press release, Viacom told:

Commissioned by Nickelodeon to commemorate the anniversary of the series' first episode, the documentary chronicles the beloved character's journey to international pop culture icon status and showcases the series' impact on everyone from President Barack Obama, kids across the globe and San Quentin inmates who readily sing its catchy theme song. The one-hour documentary, features an opening song from Avril Lavigne and commentary from creator Steve Hillenburg, cast and crew members, industry experts, fanatics and celebrities like LeBron James, Ricky Gervais and Rosario Dawson.

The documentary film was endorsed to mark the celebration of the series' 10th anniversary, following a SpongeBob marathon the next weekend. The anniversary was also celebrated with the premiere of the television film SpongeBob's Truth or Square and the special episode "To SquarePants or Not to SquarePants".

On September 22, 2009, the documentary appeared as a bonus feature on the DVD compilation SpongeBob SquarePants: The First 100 Episodes. The DVD set consists of 14 discs and runs for 2200 minutes. Other bonus features included in the DVD set are Limited edition etched Plexiglass case, Limited edition 3D lenticular, Audio Commentary from the Animation Team, Life Lessons from Bikini Bottom, "Help Wanted": The Seven Seas Edition, and Kick-Wham-Pow-Bob Music Video.

== Reception ==
The documentary film received positive reviews. David Hinckley of the New York Daily News said that the "documentary's most interesting moments come from Hillenburg, who created SpongeBob as a secondary character in a comic before breaking him out on his own in July 1999." He added that "it's fun for the whole family." R.L. Shaffer of IGN wrote "what's here is still incredibly fun to pilfer through and a true delight for longtime fans." Gord Lacey of TV Shows on DVD called the film "the single-best feature that's appeared on a Nickelodeon DVD set." Michael Cavna of The Washington Post called it "some 'cult' to have."

Aaron H. Bynum of Animation Insider said that it "is essentially of two halves, the first of which is where the value lies. The first twenty minutes or so of the documentary is excellent; profiling Hillenburg and the writers, storyboard artists, and voice actors that have accompanied him on his journey." He added that the "remainder of the documentary is chiefly fluff."
