= Brookshier =

Brookshier is a surname. Notable people with the surname include:

- Luke Brookshier (born 1971), American writer, storyboard artist, and storyboard director
- Tom Brookshier (1931–2010), American football player, coach, and sportscaster
