= Luke Brookshier =

American animator

- Born: Brian Darrell Brookshier; August 31, 1971 (age 55); Corona, California, U.S.
- Occupations: Animator; storyboard artist; screenwriter; director
- Years active: 1991–present
- Known for: SpongeBob SquarePants; Pig Goat Banana Cricket

Brian Darrell "Luke" Brookshier (born August 31, 1971) is an American animator, storyboard artist, screenwriter, and director known for his work on Nickelodeon's SpongeBob SquarePants and he was nominated for an Emmy Award for "Outstanding Animated Program" for writing the SpongeBob SquarePants episode "Wigstruck". After SpongeBob, Brookshier went on to work as writer and storyboard artist in the first season of Cartoon Network's Uncle Grandpa. He studied animation at the California Institute of Arts. He was also a storyboard artist for the animated series Kim Possible and worked on the character layout for King of the Hill. He also had one of his shows turned into a Golden Book: Mr FancyPants!. He storyboarded the Gravity Falls episode "The Hand That Rocks the Mabel" and the Wabbit episode "Sun Valley Freeze". He returned to the SpongeBob franchise as a writer in the show’s eleventh season and also helped develop the spin-offs, Kamp Koral and The Patrick Star Show.

== Television ==
- 1995: The Maxx (TV Mini Series) - Character Layout Artist, As Brian Brookshier
- 1997-1998: 101 Dalmatians: The Series - Prop Design, Storyboard Revisions
- 1998-1999: Hercules - Prop Design
- 2000–2001: Buzz Lightyear of Star Command - Prop Design, Character Designer, Additional Character Designer, Key Location Designer, As Brian Brookshier
- 2000–2002: Mission Hill - Character Layout Artist
- 2001–2002: House of Mouse - Prop Design
- 2004: Kim Possible - Storyboard Artist
- 2005: The X's - Storyboard Revisionist
- 2005–2013; 2016–present: SpongeBob SquarePants - Writer, Storyboard Director, Animation Writer, Character Designer, Songwriter, Story Editor
- 2012: Gravity Falls - Storyboard Artist
- 2013–2014: Uncle Grandpa - Writer, Storyboard Artist
- 2015: Wabbit - Storyboard Artist
- 2015–2016: Pig Goat Banana Cricket - Director
- 2017: Billy Dilley's Super-Duper Subterranean Summer - Writer, Storyboard Artist
- 2021: Kamp Koral: SpongeBob's Under Years - Co-Developer, Staff Writer, Theme Song By
- 2021: The Patrick Star Show - Co-Creator, Co-Developer, Writer

== Film ==
- 2000: Buzz Lightyear of Star Command: The Adventure Begins - Character Designer, As Brian Brookshier
- 2000: Thrillseekers: Putt n' Perish - Character Designer, Layout Artist, As Brian Brookshier
- 2003: Looney Tunes: Back in Action - Rough Inbetweener
- 2009: Square Roots: The Story of SpongeBob SquarePants - Documentary, Himself
- 2009: SpongeBob's Truth or Square - Writer, Storyboard Director, Songwriter
- 2015: The SpongeBob Movie: Sponge Out of Water - Storyboard Artist
- 2020: SpongeBob Appreciation Day: Patchy's Beach Bash! - Writer
- 2021: Tom and Jerry - Character Designer

== Video games ==
- 2000: Sabrina: The Animated Series - Zapped! - Additional Artist
- 2001: Sabrina: The Animated Series - Spooked! - Backgrounds
- 2001: WWF Betrayal - Artist, Character Animator
- 2001: Wendy: Every Witch Way - Additional Artist
- 2002: Shantae - Additional Character Animator
- 2002: The Scorpion King: Sword of Osiris - Artist, Enemy and Boss Animator
- 2002: Godzilla: Domination! - Character Animator, Illustrations
- 2004: Ping Pals - Additional Artist
- 2006: SpongeBob SquarePants: Creature from the Krusty Krab (Nintendo DS version) - Storyboard Artist, Prop Design
- 2007: Looney Tunes: Duck Amuck - Writer, Storyboard Artist
- 2011: SpongeBob SquigglePants - Writer
