= Alan Smart =

Animator

Alan Smart (born October 10, 1963) is a retired American animator and an animation director best known for his work as the supervising director on SpongeBob SquarePants, which he had been involved with from the pilot to 2021, and as assistant director and layout artist on The Simpsons (he also received credit as a director in the season three episode, "Flaming Moe's").

He has done animation for the Nicktoons CatDog, Hey Arnold, Rocko's Modern Life, Ren & Stimpy, and Sanjay and Craig and on five animated films: The Little Mermaid, The SpongeBob SquarePants Movie, The SpongeBob SquarePants Movie: Sponge Out of Water, Oliver & Company and The Chipmunk Adventure.

Alan Smart also worked on the pilot episode of Family Dog, as an animation director on Clone High and the first season of Rugrats.

== Filmography ==
=== Television ===
| Year | Title | Notes |
|---|---|---|
| 2021 | The Patrick Star Show | animation director (1 episode) supervising director (2 episodes) |
| 2013 | Sanjay and Craig | supervising timing director (10 episodes) |
| 2005 | Catscratch | sheet timer (1 episode) |
| 2002–03 | Clone High | animation director (13 episodes) |
| 1999–2021 | SpongeBob SquarePants | animation director (148 episodes) supervising director (pilot-2021) sheet timer (12 episodes) actor (3 episodes) special thanks (2 episodes) |
| 1998–99 | The Wild Thornberrys | sheet timer (25 episodes) |
| 1998–99 | CatDog | sheet timer (1 episode) animation director (11 episodes) |
| 1997 | 101 Dalmatians: The Series | animation director (2 episodes) |
| 1997 | Nightmare Ned | timing director (3 episodes) director (2 episodes) |
| 1997 | Recess | animation director (2 episodes) additional timing director (2 episodes) |
| 1996–97 | Hey Arnold! | animation director (3 episodes) director (2 episodes) |
| 1995 | Eek! the Cat | animation timer (1 episode) |
| 1994–1997 | Duckman | animation timer (15 episodes) |
| 1994–1997 | Aaahh!!! Real Monsters | sheet timer (37 episodes) |
| 1994–95 | The Ren & Stimpy Show | timing director (4 episodes) |
| 1994–95 | The Critic | animation timing (1 episode) director (3 episodes) character layout artist (1 episode) |
| 1993–96 | Rocko's Modern Life | animation director (23 episodes) |
| 1991–98 | Rugrats | animation director (44 episodes) sheet timer (2 episodes) assistant animator (1 episode) character layout artist (1 episode) assistant director (2 episodes) |
| 1990–2003 | The Simpsons | layout artist (4 episodes) animation timer (1 episode) additional timer (1 episode) character layout artist (1 episode) director (1 episode) assistant director (14 episodes) sheet director (2 episodes) |
| 1990 | Bobby's World | sheet timer (1 episode) |
| 1987 | Amazing Stories | principal assist animator (1 episode) |

=== Film ===
| Year | Title | Notes |
|---|---|---|
| 1987 | The Chipmunk Adventure | assistant animator (Animated musical film) |
| 1988 | Oliver & Company | breakdown and in between artist (Animated musical film) |
| 1988 | Technological Threat | character animator (Animated short film) |
| 1989 | The Little Mermaid | assistant animator (Animated musical film) |
| 1990 | Box-Office Bunny | assistant animator (Animated short film) |
| 1993 | Recycle Rex | timing (Animated short film) |
| 1995 | Hate | timing director (Animated short film) |
| 2003 | My Life with Morrissey | Stan (Independent film) |
| 2004 | The SpongeBob SquarePants Movie | supervising animation director (Live-action animated comedy film) |
| 2007 | SpongeBob's Atlantis SquarePantis | supervising director (Television movie) |
| 2009 | Square Roots: The Story of SpongeBob SquarePants | Himself character designer (Documentary film) |
| 2009 | SpongeBob's Truth or Square | animation director supervising director (10th Anniversary special) |
| 2011 | Legends of Bikini Bottom | animation director supervising director (Anthology film) |
| 2015 | The SpongeBob Movie: Sponge Out of Water | supervising animation director (Live-action animated comedy film) |
| 2019 | SpongeBob's Big Birthday Blowout | animation director animation supervising director (20th Anniversary special) |
| 2019 | Badge of Honor | Juror (Short film) |
| 2025 | Order Up | animation director supervising director (Short film) |
