= Steven Banks =

American actor and television writer

- Born: Steven Banks; Los Angeles County, California, U.S.
- Other name: Steve Banks
- Occupations: Musician; comedian; actor; television writer
- Years active: 1979–present

Steven Banks is an American actor, mime, musician, comedian, and writer of television, plays, books and cartoons, including CatDog, Hi Hi Puffy AmiYumi, and SpongeBob SquarePants.

== Performing ==
In 1987, Banks landed his first acting role, performing as a minor character in the fantasy-comedy Date with an Angel.

Banks hit it big when he developed (and starred in) a one-man theatrical show titled Home Entertainment Center – a comedic play about an easily distracted procrastinator trying to meet a work deadline. He gave 440 performances of Home Entertainment Center at venues like the Canon Theater, Pasadena Playhouse, Marines' Memorial Theater, and The One Act in San Francisco (where the show ran for eleven months). For his performances, he was awarded the LA Weekly Theater Award, four Drama-Logue Awards, and three San Francisco Bay Area Critic's Awards. He also performed at the Aspen Comedy festival, the Cast Theater, Callboard Theater, and Las Palmas Theater.

In 1989, Home Entertainment Center achieved national fame when it was filmed and aired on Showtime; the filming was done at the Marines' Memorial Theater. The show featured original songs written and performed by Banks. On May 14, 1989, he appeared (with Penn Jillette) on the Dr. Demento radio program (that year's Mother's Day Special) and performed a number of his songs live on-air.

The ensuing fame landed him a TV pilot on Showtime in January 1991 – The Steven Banks Show (sometimes inaccurately referenced as The Steven Brooks Show). The plot of the show was much the same as his one-act play: Banks portrayed Steven Brooks – an underachieving, chronic procrastinator fascinated by trivia and cursed with a penchant for comedic songs. Additional music was provided by Gary Stockdale.

In the summer of 1991, after Paul Reubens was arrested for allegedly masturbating in an adult movie theater, Banks was among a number of entertainers who protested the decision of CBS to drop Reubens' show from their lineup. Banks can be seen in a crowd of protestors on an LA street in the E! True Hollywood Story episode about Reubens' arrest. Reubens was later offered (and declined) a supporting role on Banks' fledgling TV program.

Showtime aired the pilot for Banks' show but never ran any other episodes. In 1994, PBS took an interest in his act. They filmed and aired The Steven Banks Show that summer – the first original sitcom ever produced and run by PBS. Brandon Tartikoff produced the show, filmed at WYES in New Orleans. A CD album for the show was also released, consisting of original songs written and performed by Banks. Thirteen episodes were shot and the program garnered critical acclaim, but one episode, "Miss Janie Regrets", was not aired due to controversy over a PBS-like children's show parody. Banks' show has attained a kind of cult status despite its short run on PBS. In one episode, Penn Jillette sang and played guitar, Teller on the keyboard, joining Steven Banks. The song was "I wear the clothes of the dead", the setup for which was Penn wearing suits bought at estate sales.

Banks has appeared in movies and several TV shows such as Beverly Hills Cop III, Dharma & Greg, King of the Hill, Dream On, Caroline in the City, The Jimmy Kimmel Show, Parks and Recreation, Mom, and Crazy Ex-Girlfriend.

== Billy the Mime ==
Banks performed as "Billy the Mime" in the 2005 comedic documentary The Aristocrats which was created by Penn Jillette and Paul Provenza. Other appearances include Jimmy Kimmel Live!, Penn & Teller's Bullshit!, Parks & Recreation (his scene was cut out), and The Green Room with Paul Provenza.

Billy the Mime presented a six-week engagement at The Flea Theater in New York and has also appeared at The Upright Citizens Brigade Theater (LA and NYC), The New York International Fringe Festival, The Montreal Just For Laughs Festival, The Aspen Comedy Festival, SketchFest (San Francisco), The Revolutions International Theater Festival (New Mexico), The Lakeshore Theater (Chicago), and in Los Angeles at The Actors Gang, Sit 'n Spin, Largo, The Comedy Central Stage, The Steve Allen Theater in Girly Magazine Party and The Rudy Casoni Show and the Sacred Fools Theater Company.

In March 2012, he performed in San Paolo, Brazil at the Risadaria Comedy Festival and did 24 shows at the Edinburgh Fringe Festival in August.

He founded Billy's Moving Art Gallery in 2014. Their slogan is "Bringing Affordable Art To The Masses Since 2014". His paintings have hung in The Museum of Modern Art, The Metropolitan Museum of Art and The Whitney Art Museum in New York, in The Los Angeles County Museum of Art, The Getty, The Broad and The Armand Hammer Museum in Los Angeles, The Hamburger Bahnhof Museum and The East Side Berlin Wall Gallery in Berlin.

== Writing ==
In 1998, Banks began writing for Nickelodeon's animated series CatDog. He wrote several CatDog books as well. He continued working for Nickelodeon, penning several SpongeBob books (including The Big Halloween Scare, which actually charted on The New York Times bestseller list).

In 2001, Banks was a freelance writer for season 2 of The Fairly OddParents.

In 2002, Banks was named head writer for The Adventures of Jimmy Neutron, Boy Genius, and in 2004, he was nominated for one of the 56th Annual Writers Guild Awards for the episode Rescue Jet Fusion.

In late 2004, he wrote for Hi Hi Puffy AmiYumi, an animated series from the Cartoon Network about the adventures of real-life J-pop music stars Ami Onuki and Yumi Yoshimura, and became a story editor and then head writer for SpongeBob SquarePants for seasons 4–9. He was nominated for an Emmy in 2008 for the SpongeBob episode he wrote, "The Two Faces of Squidward".

Banks and Penn Jillette also collaborated in writing Love Tapes – an unconventional love story for the stage which premiered in February 2005 at Sacred Fools Theater in Hollywood.

Banks' novel, King of the Creeps, was published by [Knopf] in 2006.

In 2009, he collaborated with the dance company Pilobolus co-creating a full-evening piece, Shadowland, currently touring internationally.

He developed the CGI series and wrote the pilot for Nickelodeon's Planet Sheen in 2010.

Banks' play, Looking at Christmas, opened in New York at The Flea Theater on November 20, 2010, and was filmed by local television station WNET. That play aired on WNET the following year in December 2011. He was profiled in the New York Times' Sunday Arts & Leisure Section on November 28, 2010.

He wrote the pilot for the Arnold Schwarzenegger/Stan Lee animated series The Governator.

In 2012, he wrote the pilot for a new updated version of the 1960s animated classic Underdog for Red Kite Animation, and co-developed Supernuts! with Niki Yang for Nickelodeon. In October of that year, he joined the staff of Two and a Half Men as Co-Producer.

In 2013, he wrote a one-hour dramedy pilot called A Beautiful Mess for Chuck Lorre Productions.

He co-created and directed, with Pilobolus, Shadowland, which has been performed in 31 countries and sold over 500,000 tickets. It is currently touring the US. A new full-evening piece, Shadowland II: The Adventure Continues, premiered in Berlin in 2016.

His play Looking at Christmas was published by Broadway Play Publishing in 2016. ALso in 2016, he was the head writer for Genius Brands' SpacePOP series. and co-wrote two episodes from Mixels.

In 2017, Banks developed Agent Elvis, an adult animated action/comedy project for Sony Animation and Netflix, and was a writer for Harvey Beaks.

In 2019, Banks was a writer for Lego City Adventures.

His original book series, Middle School Bites, published by Holiday House, distributed by Penguin Random House came out in 2020. There are four books in the series.

In April 2021, Banks served as a head writer on the animated streaming series Stan Lee's Superhero Kindergarten writing all 26 episodes.

== SpongeBob SquarePants ==
In 2005, Banks joined SpongeBob in season 4 as head writer and story editor for six years. SpongeBob producer Eric Coleman, called Banks to tell him he was being considered by executive producers Stephen Hillenburg and Paul Tibbitt to become a writer on the show. Banks was already a huge fan of the show and described the hiring process as being interviewed by Paul Tibbitt for about five minutes.
