= Paul Tibbitt =

American television producer, writer, and storyboard artist

- Born: Paul Harrison Tibbitt IV; Los Angeles County, California, U.S.
- Education: California Institute of the Arts
- Occupations: Animator; writer; voice actor
- Years active: 1997–present
- Employers: Nickelodeon Animation Studio (1998–2016); DreamWorks Animation (2016–2021)
- Notable work: SpongeBob SquarePants; The SpongeBob Movie: Sponge Out of Water

Signature
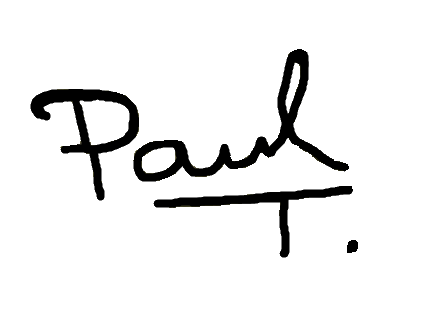

Paul Harrison Tibbitt IV is an American animator, writer, and voice actor, best known for his work on the animated series SpongeBob SquarePants. After its creator Stephen Hillenburg and creative director and supervising producer Derek Drymon resigned in 2004, Tibbitt took his position of showrunner and supervising producer for the show's fourth through ninth seasons. He also took over as the voice of Potty the Parrot, whom Hillenburg had voiced until his resignation. Tibbitt made his feature film directorial debut directing The SpongeBob Movie: Sponge Out of Water. He studied in the Character Animation program at the California Institute of the Arts.

In 2015, Tibbitt stepped down as supervising producer and showrunner. It was also announced that Tibbitt would leave the series after season 9 to work on The SpongeBob Movie: Sponge on the Run (which was produced and released by a separate crew with limited involvement from the show's crew), but he was fired and his directing and writing position was taken by Tim Hill.

== Filmography ==
=== Television ===
Year	Title	Role	Notes
1997	Nightmare Ned	Ned (segment "Chunks of life")	Writer; Storyboard artist Prop designer
1997	Recess		Storyboard revisionist
1997	101 Dalmatians: The Series		Storyboard revisions
1998	CatDog		Character designer
1998	Oh Yeah! Cartoons		Prop designer
1999–2018	SpongeBob SquarePants	Mama Krabs (2001–2003); DoodleBob (2002–2018); Potty the Parrot (2007–2012); Additional voices	Writer (1999–2012); Storyboard director (1999–2004); Director (2000–2002); Storyboard artist (1999–2004); Showrunner (2005–2015); Supervising producer (2005–2015); Co-executive producer (2006–2008); Executive producer (2008–2017); Actor; Voice actor (2001–2018)
2002–2003	Whatever Happened to... Robot Jones?		Layout artist Writer; Storyboard artist
2020–2022	The Mighty Ones		Consulting producer

=== Film ===
Year	Title	Role	Notes
1997	Loose Tooth		Animation story developer
1999	Herd	Fed #6	Writer
2002	Super Santa in South Pole Joe		Property Designer
2004	The SpongeBob SquarePants Movie		Screenwriter and storyboard artist
2007	SpongeBob's Atlantis SquarePantis		Director of live action sequences, written by live action segments, producer
2007	Diggs Tailwagger		Additional writing
2009	SpongeBob's Truth or Square		Written by live action sequences, producer
2015	The SpongeBob Movie: Sponge Out of Water	Kyle	Director, producer and story
2016	Trolls		Creative Consultant (uncredited)
2023	Ruby Gillman, Teenage Kraken		Special thanks
2025	Order Up		Writer and executive producer (short film)
