= SpongeBob SquarePants =

American animated television series

- Also known as: SpongeBob
- Genre: Comedy; Surreal comedy; Animated sitcom
- Created by: Stephen Hillenburg
- Developed by: Derek Drymon; Tim Hill; Nicholas R. Jennings
- Showrunners: Stephen Hillenburg (Note: Seasons 1–3); Paul Tibbitt (Note: Seasons 4–9); Marc Ceccarelli (Note: Season 9–present); Vincent Waller
- Creative directors: Derek Drymon; Vincent Waller
- Voices of: Various: Tom Kenny; Bill Fagerbakke; Rodger Bumpass; Clancy Brown; Mr. Lawrence; Jill Talley; Carolyn Lawrence; Mary Jo Catlett; Lori Alan; (complete list)
- Narrated by: Tom Kenny
- Theme music composer: Blaise Smith; Mark Harrison
- Opening theme: "SpongeBob SquarePants Theme Song" (Note: Performed by Patrick Pinney, Devin Johnson, Sara Paxton, and Camryn Walling)
- Ending theme: "SpongeBob Closing Theme" (Note: Composed by Steve Belfer)
- Composers: Various: Steve Belfer; Nicolas Carr; Gary Stockdale; Sage Guyton; Jeremy Wakefield; Brad Carow; The Blue Hawaiians; Eban Schletter; Barry Anthony Trop
- Country of origin: United States
- Original language: English
- No. of seasons: 17
- No. of episodes: 345 (list of episodes)

Production
- Executive producers: Stephen Hillenburg (Note: Hillenburg remains posthumously credited as executive producer after his death in 2018.); Paul Tibbitt (Note: Seasons 6–9); Marc Ceccarelli (Note: Season 13–present); Vincent Waller
- Producers: Donna Castricone; Anne Michaud; Helen Kalafatic; Dina Buteyn; Jennie Monica; Joe Crowley
- Running time: 22–51 minutes
- Production companies: United Plankton Pictures, Inc.; Nickelodeon Animation Studio

Original release
- Network: Nickelodeon (Note: Episode 175, "It's a SpongeBob Christmas!", was first broadcast on CBS.)
- Release: May 1, 1999 – present

Related
- Kamp Koral: SpongeBob's Under Years; The Patrick Star Show

SpongeBob SquarePants, also known simply as SpongeBob, is an American animated comedy television series created by marine science educator and animator Stephen Hillenburg for Nickelodeon. It first aired as a sneak peek after the Kids' Choice Awards on May 1, 1999, and officially premiered on July 17, 1999. It follows the adventures of SpongeBob SquarePants, an anthropomorphic yellow sea sponge, and his aquatic friends in the underwater city of Bikini Bottom.

Many of the series' ideas originated in The Intertidal Zone, an educational comic book about undersea life that Hillenburg created in the 1980s. After working on Nickelodeon's Rocko's Modern Life, he developed SpongeBob into a television series and pitched it to Nickelodeon in 1997. The network's executives wanted SpongeBob to be a child in school, but Hillenburg preferred SpongeBob to be an adult. He compromised by creating the character Mrs. Puff, SpongeBob's boat-driving teacher, which allowed SpongeBob to attend school as an adult. Hillenburg departed from the series after the first three seasons and the production of The SpongeBob SquarePants Movie (2004), but returned in 2015 until his death in 2018.

SpongeBob has received widespread critical acclaim since its release, with praise given to its characters, surreal humor, writing, visuals, animation, and Hawaiian-influenced soundtrack. It quickly became Nickelodeon's highest-rated program and has earned a variety of awards, including six Annie Awards, eight Golden Reel Awards, four Emmy Awards, two BAFTA Children's Awards, and a record twenty-three Kids' Choice Awards. It is often considered to be one of the greatest animated series of all time. The show has been noted as a cultural touchstone for Millennials and Generation Z, and it has spawned numerous internet memes.

The series has run for sixteen seasons, with its seventeenth season premiering on June 12, 2026. On June 9, 2026, the series was renewed for a sixteenth production cycle, which would consist of the eighteenth and nineteenth seasons. SpongeBob is the fourth longest-running American animated series in history, and the longest-running American children's animated series as of 2026. Its popularity has made it a multimedia franchise and Nickelodeon's most profitable program, generating over $16 billion in merchandising revenue by 2024. The franchise now includes four theatrical feature films, two streaming feature films, a Broadway musical, a comic book series, numerous video games and two spin-off series: Kamp Koral: SpongeBob's Under Years (2021–2024) and The Patrick Star Show (2021–present).

== Premise ==
=== Characters ===
The series' main characters. Top row, from left to right: Pearl, Plankton, and Karen. Bottom row: Sandy, Mr. Krabs, SpongeBob, Squidward, Gary, Patrick, and Mrs. Puff.

The series follows SpongeBob SquarePants—an energetic and optimistic sea sponge who lives in a submerged pineapple—and his aquatic friends. SpongeBob has a childlike enthusiasm for life and works as a fry cook at the Krusty Krab, a fast food restaurant. He enjoys catching jellyfish and blowing soap bubbles into elaborate shapes, and he hopes to one day obtain a boat-driving license. He has a pet sea snail named Gary, who meows like a cat.

SpongeBob's best friend is Patrick Star, a dimwitted yet friendly pink starfish who resides under a rock. Patrick is unaware of his stupidity and considers himself intelligent. Squidward Tentacles, SpongeBob's neighbor and co-worker at the Krusty Krab, is a grumpy and cynical octopus who lives in an Easter Island moai. He despises his job and is constantly annoyed by the antics of SpongeBob and Patrick. Mr. Krabs, a greedy red crab, is the owner of the Krusty Krab and often serves as a father figure to SpongeBob. He has a teenage daughter, a grey sperm whale named Pearl, who has no interest in taking over the family business. Another of SpongeBob's friends is Sandy Cheeks, a thrill-seeking squirrel from Texas, who wears a diving suit to breathe underwater. She is an expert in karate.

Located across the street from the Krusty Krab is an unsuccessful rival restaurant called the Chum Bucket. It rarely has any customers due to its sale of chum. It is run by a small, green, one-eyed copepod named Plankton and his computer wife, Karen, who try to steal the Krabby Patty secret recipe. When SpongeBob is not working at the Krusty Krab, he can often be found taking boating lessons from Mrs. Puff, a paranoid but patient pufferfish. SpongeBob wants to obtain a boat-driving license, but he often panics and crashes, causing him to fail the course multiple times.

The French Narrator, or "Frenchy", is an unseen narrator who often introduces episodes and narrates intertitles as if the series were a documentary about the ocean. His role and manner of speaking are references to the oceanographer Jacques Cousteau. Beginning in season 10, the narrator has occasionally appeared in live-action as a diver in a heavy deep sea diving suit.

Recurring guest characters include the retired superheroes Mermaid Man and Barnacle Boy, who are idolized by SpongeBob and Patrick; a pirate specter known as the Flying Dutchman; the muscular lifeguard Larry the Lobster; and the merman god of the sea, King Neptune.

Special episodes of the show are hosted by a live-action pirate named Patchy and his pet parrot Potty, whose segments are presented in a dual narrative with the animated stories. Patchy is depicted as the president of a fictional SpongeBob fan club, and his greatest aspiration is to meet SpongeBob himself.

=== Setting ===
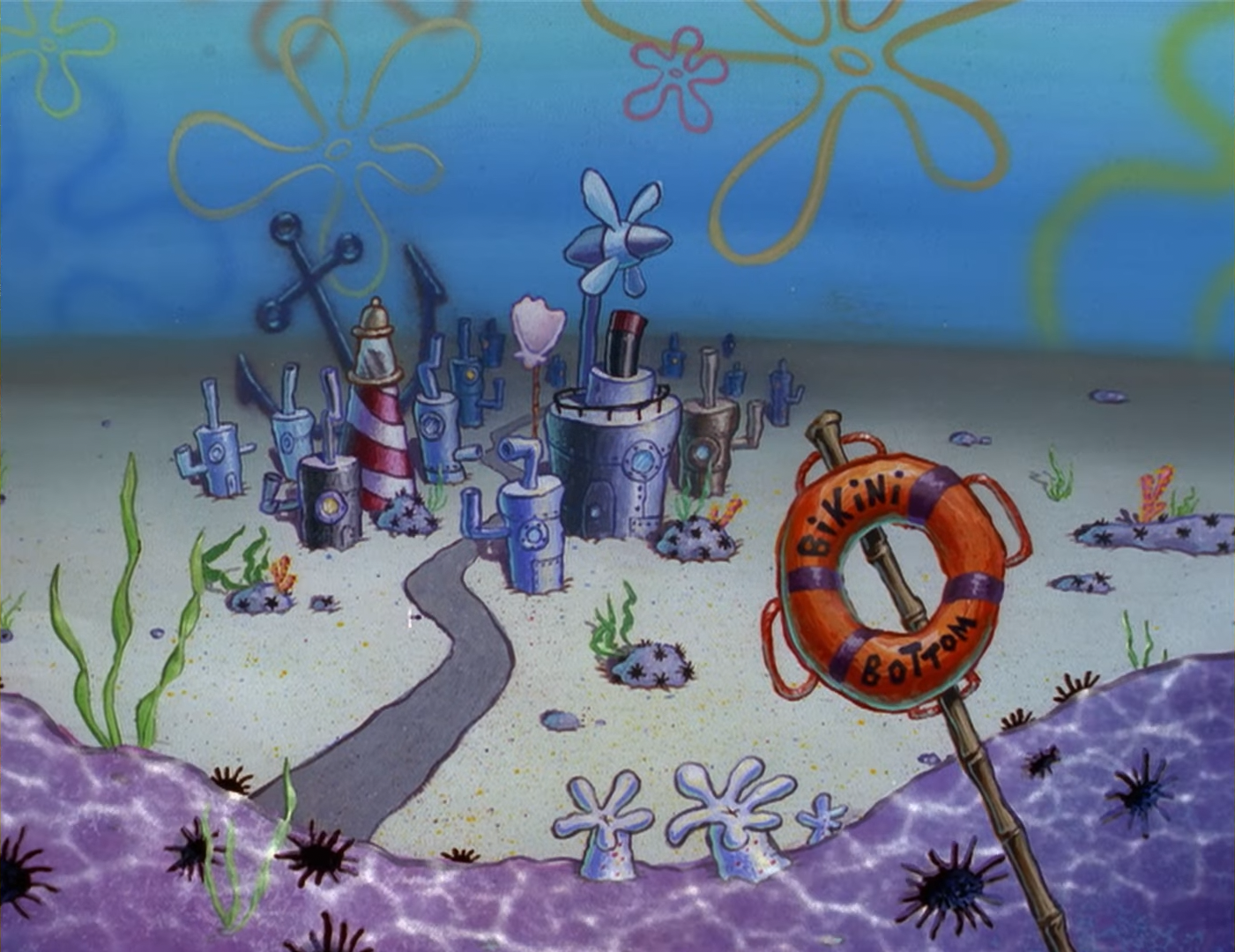
A still image of Bikini Bottom from the series

The series takes place primarily in the fictional underwater city of Bikini Bottom located in the Pacific Ocean beneath the real-life coral reef known as Bikini Atoll. (Note: Attributed to multiple references:) Its citizens are mostly multicolored fish who live in buildings made from ship funnels, and use "boatmobiles" for transportation. Recurring locations within Bikini Bottom include the neighboring houses of SpongeBob, Patrick, and Squidward; two competing restaurants, the Krusty Krab and the Chum Bucket; Mrs. Puff's Boating School, which includes a driving course and a sunken lighthouse; the Treedome, an oxygenated glass enclosure where Sandy lives; Shady Shoals Rest Home; a seagrass meadow called Jellyfish Fields; and Goo Lagoon, a subaqueous brine pool that is a popular beach hangout.

When the SpongeBob crew began production of the series' pilot episode, they were tasked with designing stock locations where many scenes would take place. The idea was "to keep everything nautical", so the crew included objects like ropes, wooden planks, ships' wheels, netting, anchors, boilerplates, and rivets. Transitions between scenes are marked by bubbles filling the screen, accompanied by the sound of rushing water. The settings also feature "sky flowers", which have a similar function to clouds, according to background designer Kenny Pittenger. The sky flowers are also meant to "evoke the look of a flower-print Hawaiian shirt".

In 2015, Tom Kenny, who voices SpongeBob, denied a fan theory claiming that the series' characters are mutants who were exposed to nuclear testing at Bikini Atoll. In 2024, Plankton voice actor Mr. Lawrence said the theory is true, and that the real-life nuclear testing influenced other aspects of the show as well.

== Production ==
=== Development ===
==== Early inspirations ====
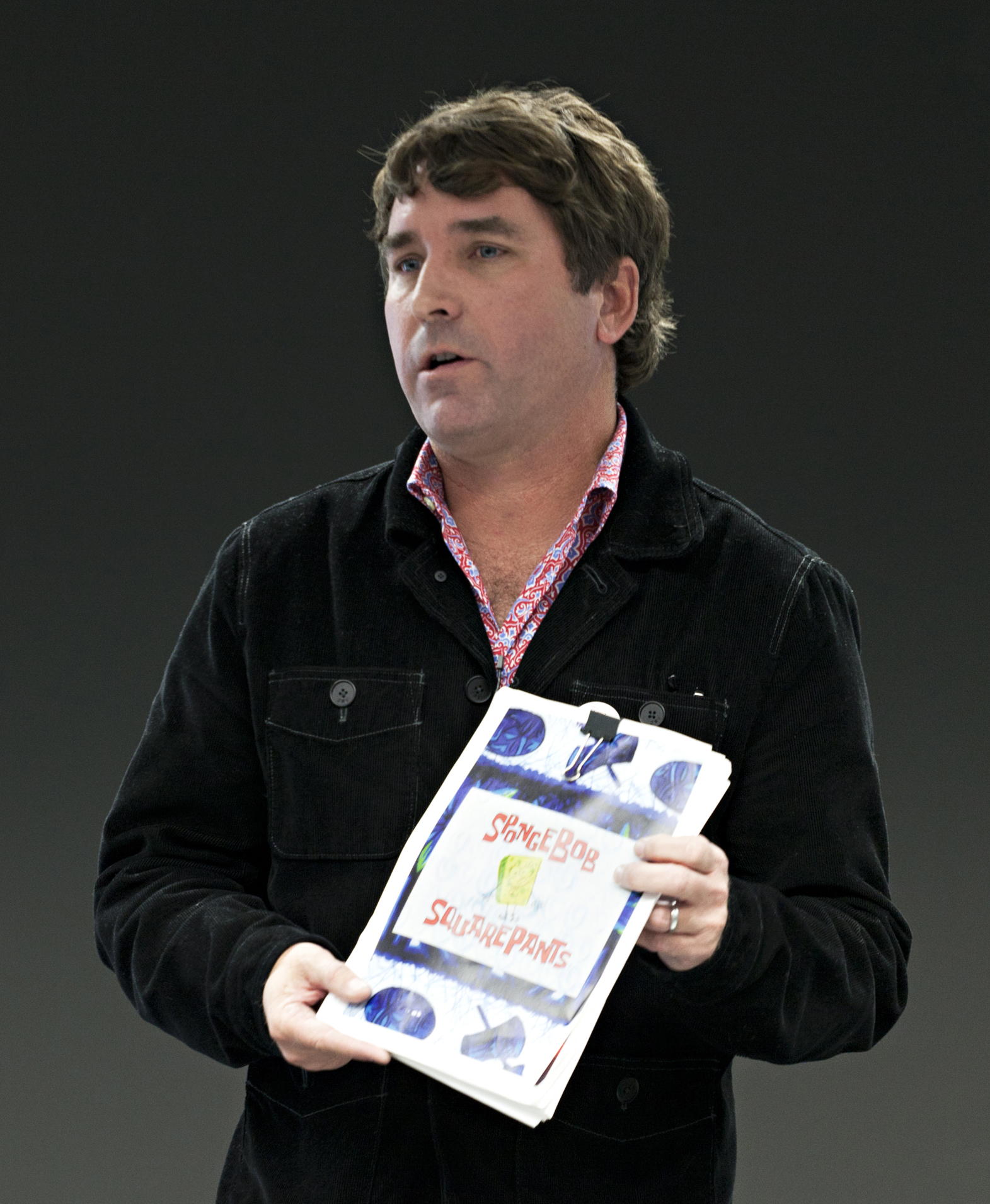
Before creating SpongeBob, Stephen Hillenburg (pictured in 2011) taught marine biology to visitors of the Ocean Institute at Dana Point, California.

Series creator Stephen Hillenburg became fascinated with the ocean as a child and began developing his artistic abilities at a young age. Although these interests would not overlap for some time—the idea of drawing fish seemed boring to him—Hillenburg pursued both during college, majoring in marine biology and minoring in art at Humboldt State University. After graduating in 1984, he joined the Ocean Institute, an organization in Dana Point, California, dedicated to educating the public about marine science and maritime history.

While Hillenburg was working at the Ocean Institute, his love of the ocean began to influence his art. He created a comic book precursor to SpongeBob titled The Intertidal Zone, which was used by the institute to teach visitors about the animal life of tide pools. The comic featured various anthropomorphic lifeforms, many of which would evolve into SpongeBob characters. Hillenburg tried to get the comic published, but none of the companies he sent it to were interested.

One of Hillenburg's major inspirations was Ween's 1997 album The Mollusk, which had a nautical and underwater theme. Hillenburg contacted the band shortly after the album's release, explaining the baseline ideas for SpongeBob. He also commissioned a song, "Loop de Loop", which was used in the SpongeBob episode "Your Shoe's Untied". (Note: Attributed to multiple references:)

==== Concept ====
While working as a staff artist at the Ocean Institute, Hillenburg intended to return to college for a master's degree in art. However, after attending an animation festival, he decided to instead study experimental animation at California Institute of the Arts. His thesis film, Wormholes, is about the theory of relativity. It was screened at festivals, and at one of these, Hillenburg met Joe Murray, who was in the process of developing the popular Nickelodeon animated series Rocko's Modern Life. Murray was impressed by the style of Hillenburg's film and offered him a job as a director for the first season, which began airing in 1993. Hillenburg worked on the series throughout its entire four-season run, and during the fourth season he took on the roles of producer and creative director. (Note: Attributed to multiple references:)

Martin Olson, one of the writers for Rocko's Modern Life, read The Intertidal Zone and encouraged Hillenburg to create a television series with a similar concept. At that point, Hillenburg had not considered creating his own series. (Note: Attributed to multiple references:) He began to develop some of the characters from The Intertidal Zone, including Bob the Sponge. He wanted his series to stand out from other popular cartoons of the time, many of which were buddy comedies like The Ren & Stimpy Show. Hillenburg decided to focus on a single main character: a sea sponge, the "weirdest" sea creature he could think of. Bob the Sponge resembled a real-life sea sponge, and Hillenburg used this design in the early stages. (Note: Attributed to multiple references:) He decided to model the character after a kitchen sponge after realizing it would perfectly match the character's "square" personality. (Note: Attributed to multiple references:) In determining the character's behavior, Hillenburg was inspired by innocent, childlike figures that he enjoyed, such as Charlie Chaplin, Laurel and Hardy, Jerry Lewis, and Pee-wee Herman. (Note: Attributed to multiple references:)

Seeking a voice actor for the series' main character, Hillenburg approached Tom Kenny, whose career in animation had started alongside Hillenburg's on Rocko's Modern Life. Elements of Kenny's own personality were employed to develop the character further. Initially, Hillenburg wanted to use the name "SpongeBoy"—the character had no last name—and the series would have been named SpongeBoy Ahoy! However, the Nickelodeon legal department discovered that the name "SpongeBoy" was already trademarked and in use by a commercial mop product. (Note: Attributed to multiple references:) In choosing a replacement name, Hillenburg felt he still had to use the word "Sponge", so that viewers would not mistake the character for a "cheese man". He settled on the name "SpongeBob". The surname "SquarePants" was chosen after Kenny saw a picture of the character and remarked, "Boy, look at this sponge in square pants, thinking he can get a job in a fast food place." When he heard Kenny say it, Hillenburg loved the phrase and felt it would reinforce the character's nerdiness.

==== Assembling the crew ====
Many of the major contributors to SpongeBob had previously worked with Hillenburg on Rocko's Modern Life, including creative director Derek Drymon, art director Nick Jennings, supervising director Alan Smart, writer and voice actor Mr. Lawrence, and Tim Hill, who helped develop the series bible. Although Drymon would go on to have a significant influence on SpongeBob, he was not offered a role on the series initially. As a late recruit to Rocko's Modern Life, he had not established a strong relationship with Hillenburg prior to SpongeBob's development. Hillenburg first sought to recruit Drymon's storyboard partner, Mark O'Hare, but he had recently created the soon-to-be syndicated comic strip, Citizen Dog, and lacked the time to get involved with SpongeBob, although he would later join the series as a writer. Drymon begged Hillenburg for a job, and after Hillenburg gave it some thought, he brought Drymon on as creative director. The two began meeting at Hillenburg's house several times a week to develop the series. According to Drymon, this occurred in 1996, shortly after the end of Rocko's Modern Life.

Nick Jennings was also instrumental in SpongeBob's genesis, and was described by Kenny as an "early graphics mentor". On weekends, Kenny joined Hillenburg, Jennings, and Drymon for creative sessions where they recorded ideas on a tape recorder. Kenny performed audio tests as SpongeBob during these sessions, while Hillenburg voiced the other characters. Tim Hill contributed scripts for the pilot and several first-season episodes, and was offered the role of story editor. He turned down the offer, and Pete Burns was hired instead. (Note: Attributed to multiple references:)

==== Pitching ====
When pitching the idea for the series to Nickelodeon executives, Drymon said the SpongeBob crew "went all out" because they thought the pilot would only be accepted if the executives laughed. Hillenburg wore a Hawaiian shirt, brought along a terrarium containing models of the characters, and played Hawaiian music to set the tone. Executive Eric Coleman described the pitch as "pretty amazing"; his colleagues Kevin Kay and Albie Hecht had to step outside because they were exhausted from laughing. Drymon expected the executives to take weeks to make a decision, but they offered to fund the pilot episode immediately. The crew was given two weeks to write the pilot, titled "Help Wanted".

Before commissioning the full series, Nickelodeon insisted that it would only be popular if SpongeBob was a child who went to school. The studio felt their popular shows, such as Hey Arnold!, demonstrated that this approach was a formula for success. Hillenburg was ready to abandon the series, since he wanted SpongeBob to be an adult, but he compromised by adding a new character, Mrs. Puff, a boat-driving teacher whose school SpongeBob would attend. Hillenburg was satisfied with the compromise and happy that it brought in a new character. (Note: Attributed to multiple references:)

=== Executive producers and showrunners ===
Hillenburg served as the executive producer of the series from its debut in 1999 until his death in 2018. He was its showrunner from 1999 until 2004. Hillenburg halted production of the show in 2002 to work on the feature film The SpongeBob SquarePants Movie, which he intended to be the series finale. However, the show's massive financial success led to its continuation. Hillenburg appointed Paul Tibbitt, who had previously served as a writer, director, and storyboard artist, to take over as showrunner. He considered Tibbitt one of his favorite crew members, and deeply trusted him. Although Hillenburg no longer had a direct role in the series' production, he maintained an advisory role and reviewed each episode.

In December 2014, it was announced that Hillenburg would return to the series in an unspecified position. In March 2017, he was diagnosed with amyotrophic lateral sclerosis (ALS), and on November 26, 2018, at the age of 57, he died of complications from the disease. (Note: Attributed to multiple references:) In February 2019, incoming Nickelodeon president Brian Robbins vowed to keep SpongeBob in production for as long as the network exists. As of 2024, former writers and storyboard directors Vincent Waller and Marc Ceccarelli are serving as the series' showrunners.

=== Writing ===
According to writer and storyboard artist Luke Brookshier, SpongeBob is written differently from many other television shows—it does not use written scripts. Instead, storylines are developed by a team of five "outline and premise" writers. A two-page outline is then assigned to a team of storyboard directors, who produce a complete rough draft of the storyboard. Most of the dialogue and jokes are added during this stage. Brookshier has compared this process to how cartoons were made in the early days of animation. Almost every episode is divided into two 11-minute segments, due to Hillenburg's belief that SpongeBob works better in short-form than in long-form. The writing staff often used their personal experiences as inspiration for storylines. For example, the episode "Sailor Mouth", in which SpongeBob and Patrick learn profanity and begin to swear profusely, was inspired by Drymon's childhood experience of getting into trouble for using the word "fuck" in front of his mother.

=== Voice actors ===
==== Main cast ====
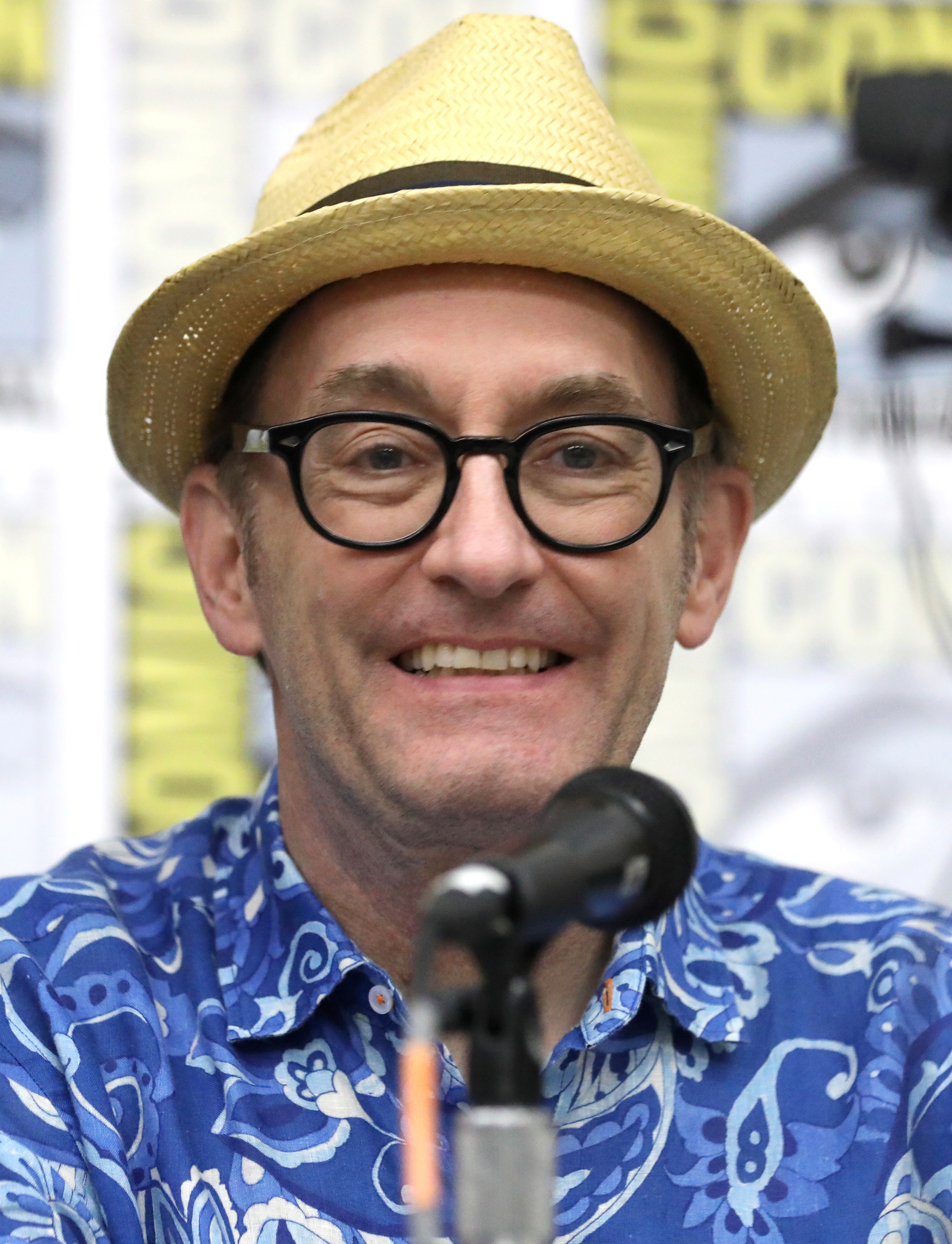
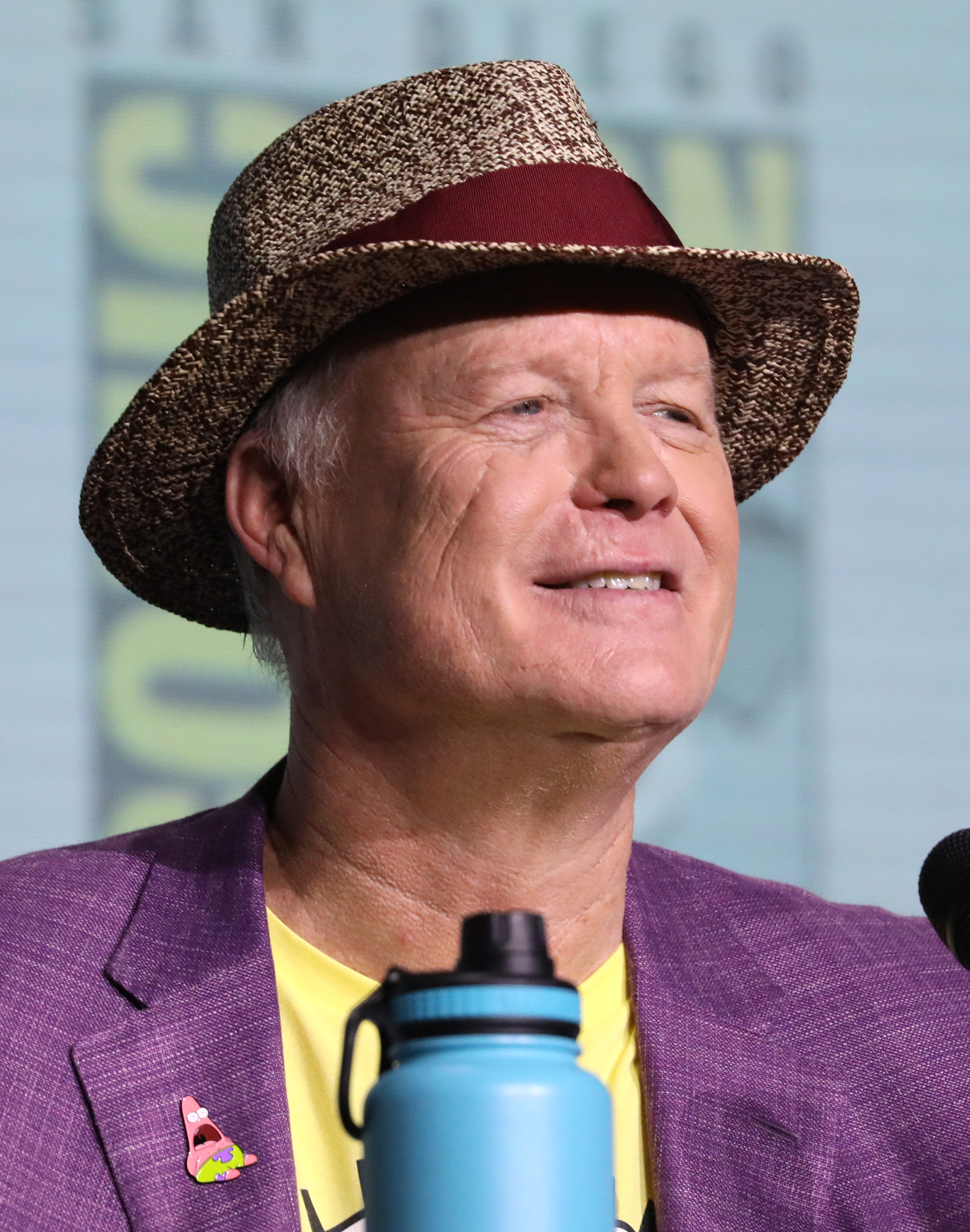
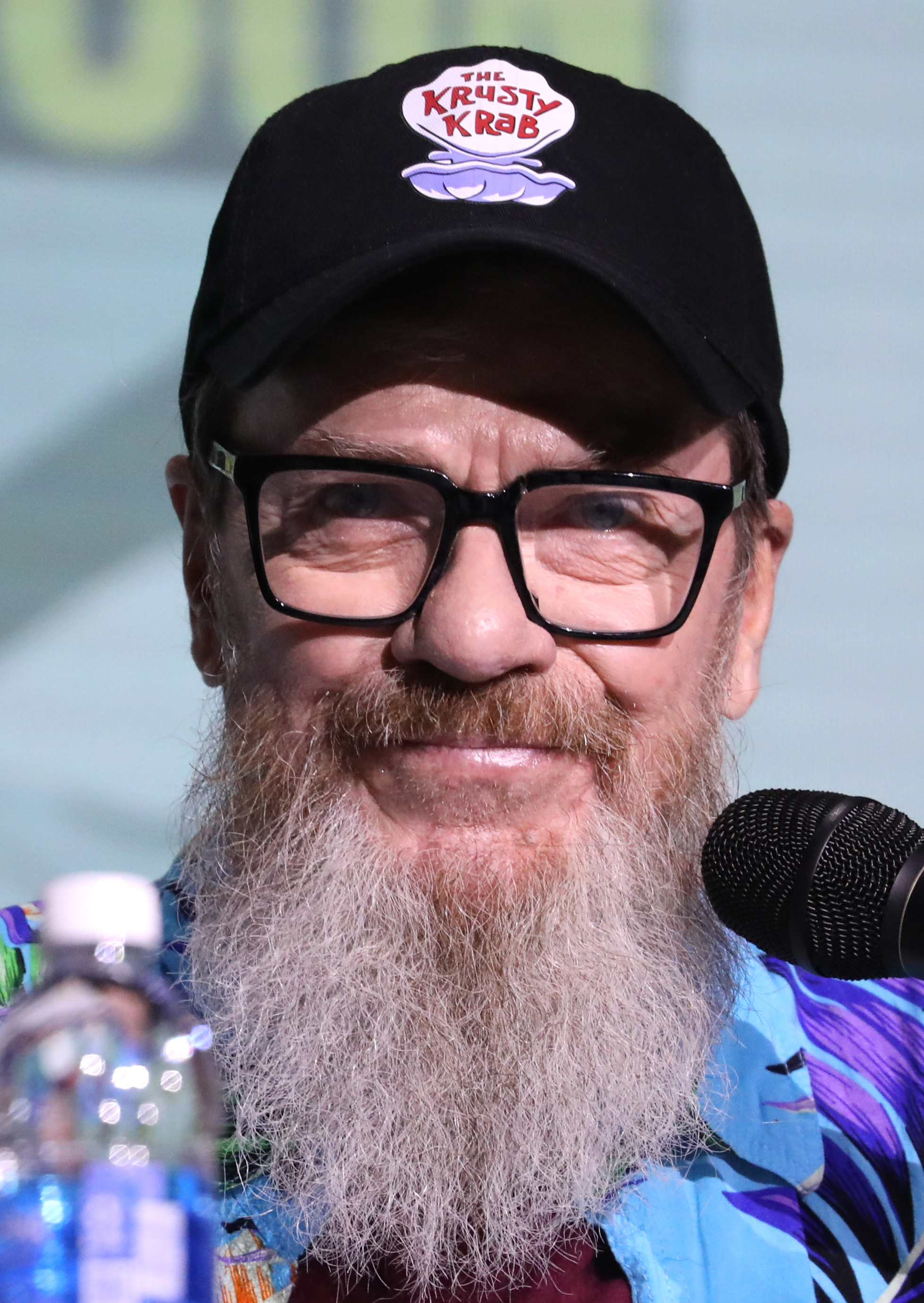
Left to right: Tom Kenny (SpongeBob), Bill Fagerbakke (Patrick), and Rodger Bumpass (Squidward)
- Tom Kenny as SpongeBob SquarePants, Gary, French Narrator and Patchy the Pirate
- Bill Fagerbakke as Patrick Star
- Rodger Bumpass as Squidward Tentacles
- Clancy Brown as Mr. Krabs
- Mr. Lawrence as Plankton, Potty the Parrot (starting in season 10), Larry the Lobster, Realistic Fish Head and Fred
- Jill Talley as Karen
- Carolyn Lawrence as Sandy Cheeks
- Mary Jo Catlett as Mrs. Puff
- Lori Alan as Pearl Krabs

Most one-off and background characters are voiced by Dee Bradley Baker, Sirena Irwin, Bob Joles, Mark Fite and Thomas F. Wilson.

==== Casting ====
As Hillenburg, Drymon and Hill were writing the pilot episode, Hillenburg was also conducting auditions for voice actors. Tom Kenny had previously worked with Hillenburg on Rocko's Modern Life, and Hillenburg liked the voice he had used for a minor character. He approached Kenny about voicing SpongeBob, but Kenny had forgotten how to perform the voice; Hillenburg used a video clip from Rocko to remind him. Nickelodeon insisted on auditioning more actors for the role of SpongeBob, but Hillenburg turned them down. According to Kenny, Hillenburg described SpongeBob to him as childlike and naive, somewhere between an adult and a child. The casting crew wanted SpongeBob to have an annoying laugh in the tradition of Popeye and Woody Woodpecker.

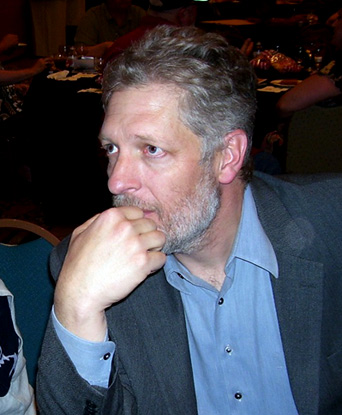
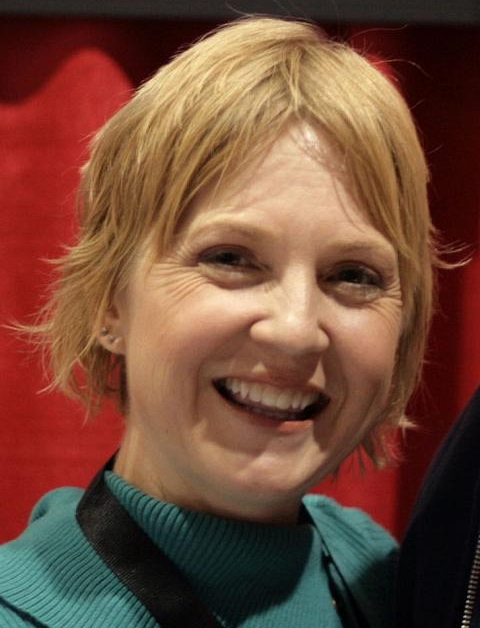
Left to right: Clancy Brown (Mr. Krabs) and Carolyn Lawrence (Sandy Cheeks)

During Bill Fagerbakke's audition for Patrick, Hillenburg played him a portion of Kenny's performance as SpongeBob to serve as a counterpoint. Whenever Patrick is angry, Fagerbakke models his performance on the actress Shelley Winters. Rodger Bumpass described his character Squidward as "a very nasally, monotone kind of guy." Bumpass found Squidward interesting due to his range of emotions, including frustration, apoplexy and sarcasm. Hillenburg modeled Mr. Krabs after his former manager at a seafood restaurant, whose strong Maine accent reminded Hillenburg of a pirate. Clancy Brown added a slight Scottish accent to the "piratey" voice of the character.

When the series began, Mr. Lawrence voiced a variety of minor characters, including Plankton, who was initially only meant to appear in one episode. According to Lawrence, Nickelodeon executives wanted Hillenburg to stunt-cast a celebrity for Plankton, but he declined. Talley and Mr. Lawrence often improvise the dialogue of Plankton and Karen; Lawrence said improvisation is his favorite part of the job. Electronic sound effects are added to create a robotic sound when Karen speaks.

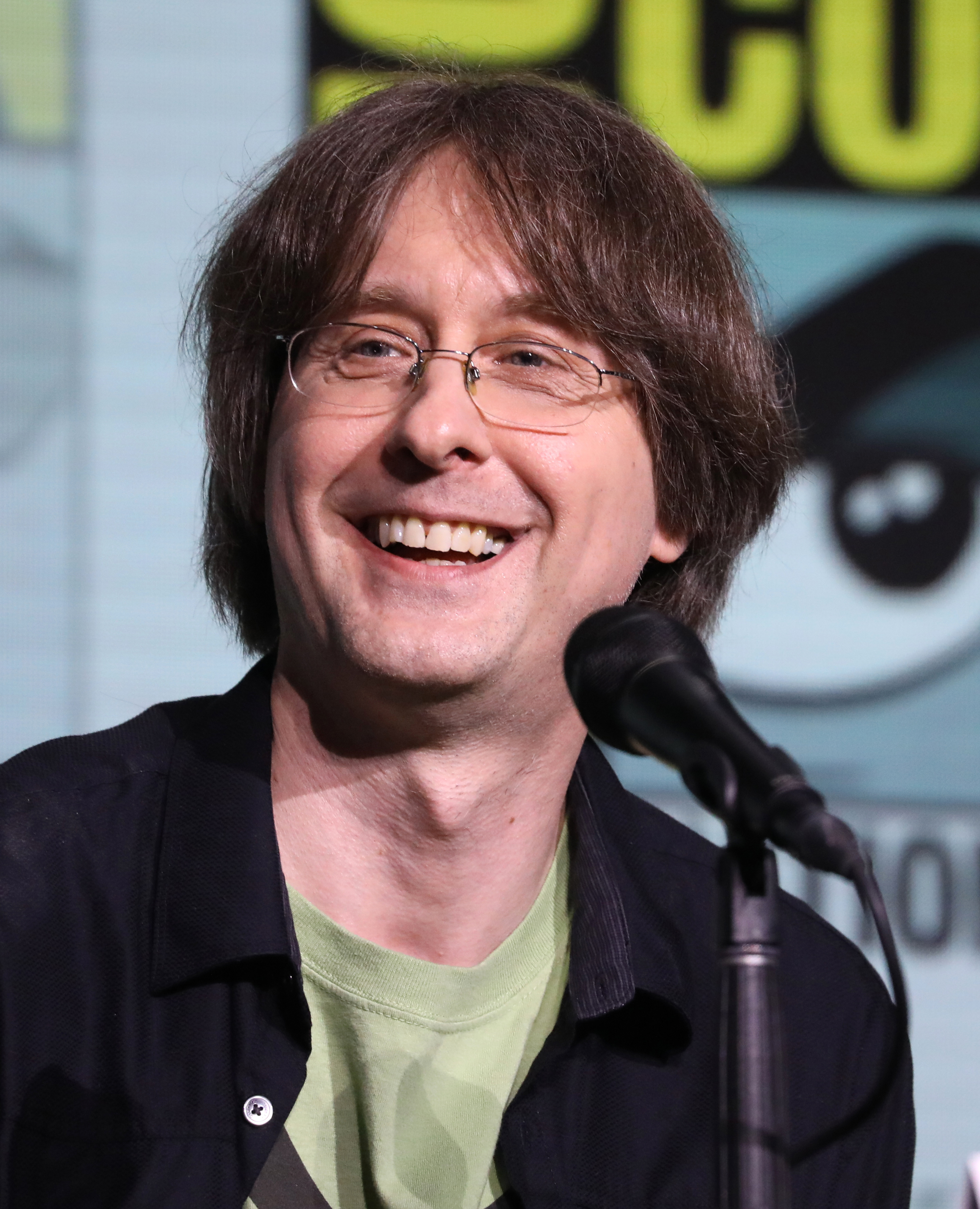
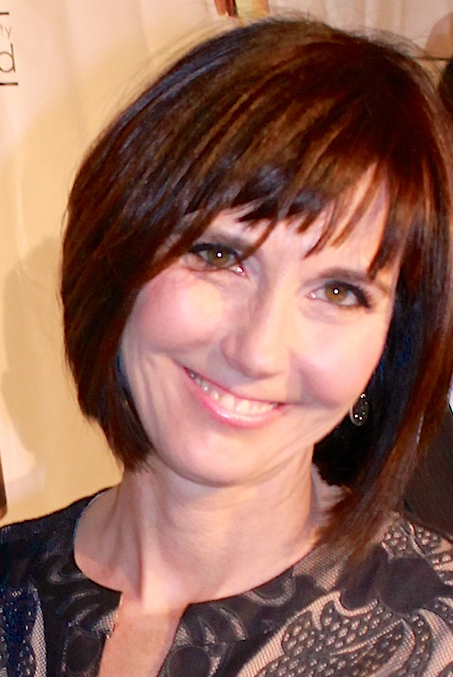
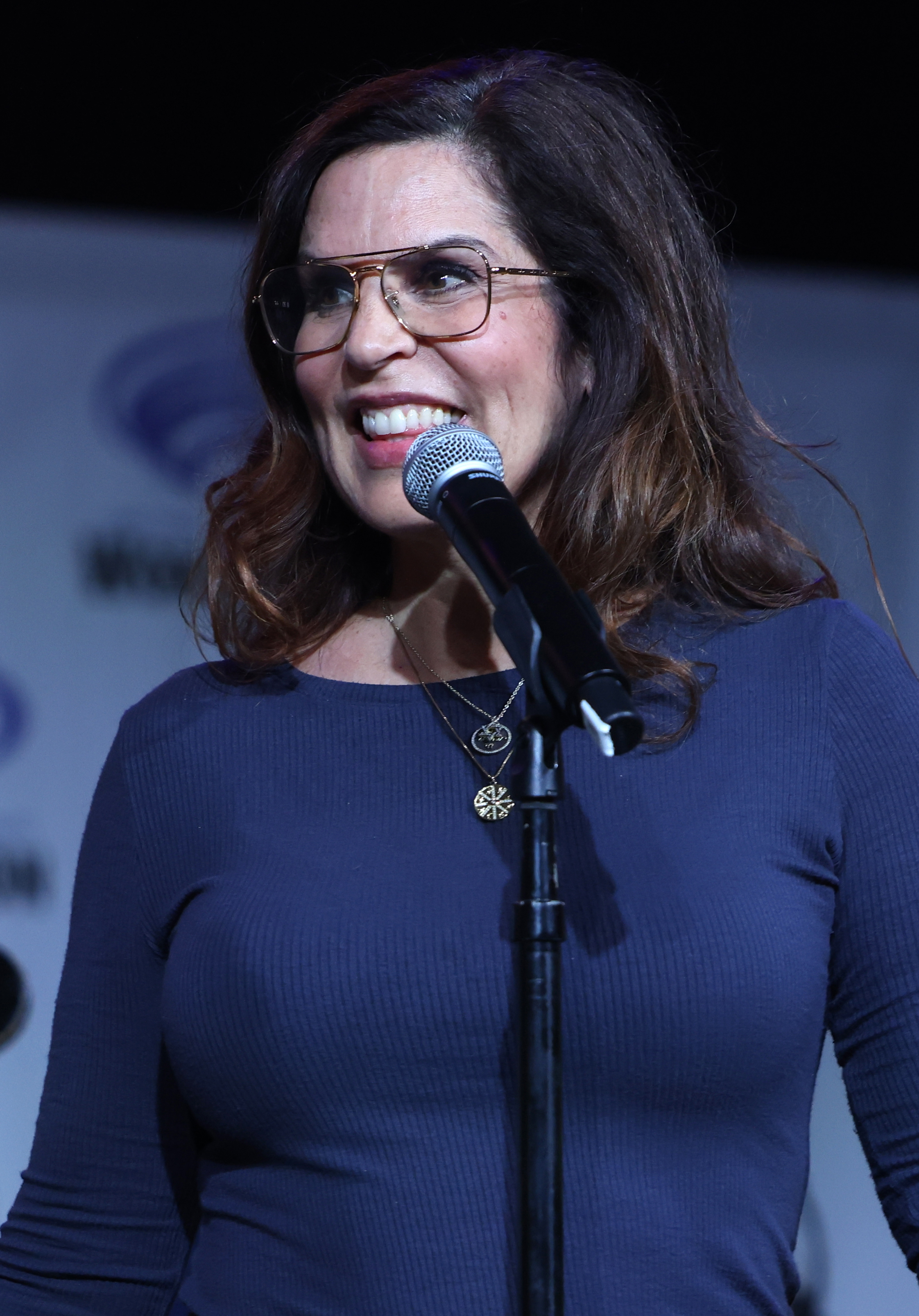
Left to right: Mr. Lawrence (Plankton), Jill Talley (Karen) and Lori Alan (Pearl)

During her audition for Pearl, Lori Alan was shown an early drawing of the characters and noted that Pearl was much larger than the others. She decided to express the character's size by making her voice deep and full in tone, while also incorporating the low sound of whale vocalizations. At the same time, Alan sought to make the teenage Pearl sound childlike, spoiled, and lovable.

In addition to the main cast, some episodes feature guest voice performers. Recurring guest performers include Ernest Borgnine as Mermaid Man (1999–2012), Tim Conway as Barnacle Boy (1999–2019), Brian Doyle-Murray as the Flying Dutchman and Marion Ross as Grandma SquarePants. (Note: Attributed to multiple references:) Notable guests with cameo appearances include David Bowie as Lord Royal Highness, (Note: In the television film Atlantis SquarePantis) John Goodman as Santa, (Note: In the episode "It's a SpongeBob Christmas!") Johnny Depp as the surf guru Jack Kahuna Laguna, (Note: In the episode "SpongeBob SquarePants vs. The Big One") and Victoria Beckham as Queen Amphitrite. (Note: In the episode "The Clash of Triton") (Note: Attributed to multiple references:)

Voice recording sessions always include the full cast of actors, which gives SpongeBob a unique feeling according to Kenny. For the first three seasons, Hillenburg and Drymon directed the actors. Andrea Romano became the voice director in the fourth season, and Kenny took over during the ninth.

=== Animation ===
Until at least 2009, the production of SpongeBob was overseen at Nickelodeon Animation Studio in Burbank, California, with additional animation services carried out at Rough Draft Korea in Seoul. (Note: Attributed to multiple references:) The California crew would create storyboards, which would then be used as templates by the crew at Rough Draft, who would animate each scene by hand, color each cel on computers, and paint backgrounds. The final stages of production, including editing and adding music, would be completed in California.

During the first season, the series used cel animation. A shift was made the following year to digital ink and paint animation. Starting with the fifth season episode "Pest of the West" (2008), the crew began using drawing tablets, which allowed them to draw on computer screens and make immediate changes or undo mistakes. Background designer Kenny Pittenger noted that many of his colleagues did not like the tablets, preferring the immediacy of drawing on paper.

Screen Novelties created character models based on the works of Rankin/Bass for the show's stop-motion episodes.

Since 2004, the SpongeBob crew has periodically collaborated with the Los Angeles-based animation studio Screen Novelties to create stop-motion sequences for special episodes. The studio produced a brief claymation scene for the climax of The SpongeBob SquarePants Movie, followed by an opening sequence for the series' tenth anniversary special in 2009. (Note: Attributed to multiple references:) The abominable snow mollusk, an octopus-like creature who acts as the antagonist of the episode "Frozen Face-Off", was also animated by the company using claymation.

In 2011, the SpongeBob team asked Screen Novelties to animate an entire episode—the holiday special "It's a SpongeBob Christmas!"—using stop-motion animation. The episode reimagined the show's characters as if they were part of a Rankin/Bass holiday film. (Note: Attributed to multiple references:) Unconventional materials such as baking soda, glitter, wood chips, and breakfast cereal were used to create sets for the episode. For their work on the holiday special, Screen Novelties earned one award and two nominations at the 40th Annie Awards, a nomination at the 2013 Golden Reel Awards, and a nomination at the 2013 Annecy International Animated Film Festival. (Note: Attributed to multiple references:) A second stop-motion special, themed around Halloween and using the same Rankin/Bass-inspired character models, was produced for season 11.

=== Music ===
Mark Harrison and Blaise Smith composed the SpongeBob SquarePants theme song, with lyrics written by Hillenburg and Drymon. The melody was inspired by the sea shanty "Blow the Man Down". The opening sequence of each episode features "Painty the Pirate", a character in an oil painting who sings the theme song. Patrick Pinney voices Painty, while Hillenburg's lips are superimposed onto the painting and move along with the lyrics. Kenny joked that the lips are the closest fans will ever come to seeing Hillenburg, due to his private nature.

A cover of the theme song by Avril Lavigne can be found on The SpongeBob SquarePants Movie soundtrack. Another cover by the Violent Femmes aired on Nickelodeon as a promotion when SpongeBob moved to prime time. Steve Belfer wrote and performed the music heard during the end credits of each episode.

The series' music editor and main composer is Nicolas Carr. After working with Hillenburg on Rocko's Modern Life, he struggled to find another job in his field. He was considering a career change before Hillenburg offered him the role of composer for SpongeBob. The first season's score primarily featured selections from the Associated Production Music Library (APML), which Carr has said includes "lots of great old corny Hawaiian music and big, full, dramatic orchestral scores." Carr said he tries to make the show's music "as funny and ridiculous as possible."

Hillenburg felt it was important for the series to develop its own music library, consisting of scores that could be reused and re-edited throughout the years. He wanted these scores to be composed by unknowns, and a group of twelve was assembled. They formed "The Sponge Divers Orchestra", which includes Carr, Belfer, and Gary Stockdale. The group went on to provide most of the music for later seasons, although Carr still draws from the APML, as well as a library he founded himself—Animation Music Inc.

== Release ==
=== Broadcast ===
Before the series' television debut, the original version of "Help Wanted" was shown on April 18, 1998, at the third Big Stinkin' International Improv & Sketch Comedy Festival in Austin, Texas, as part of a Nickelodeon showcase. SpongeBob SquarePants first aired as a preview after the 1999 Kids' Choice Awards on May 1, 1999, and officially premiered on July 17, 1999.

Season	Episodes		Segments	Originally released		Avg. viewers (millions)
Season	Episodes		Segments	First released	Last released	Avg. viewers (millions)
1	20		41	May 1, 1999	March 3, 2001	2.65
2	20		39	October 20, 2000	July 26, 2003	2.88
3	20		37	October 5, 2001	October 11, 2004	4.42
4	20		38	May 6, 2005	July 24, 2007	3.86
5	20		41	February 19, 2007	July 19, 2009	4.11
6	26		47	March 3, 2008	July 5, 2010	4.09
7	26		50	July 19, 2009	June 11, 2011	4.54
8	26		47	March 26, 2011	December 6, 2012	3.26
9	26	11	20	July 21, 2012	March 29, 2015	2.79
9	26	15	29	July 16, 2015	February 20, 2017	2.79
10	11		22	October 15, 2016	December 2, 2017	1.95
11	26		50	June 24, 2017	November 25, 2018	1.54
12	26		48	November 11, 2018	April 29, 2022	0.95
13	26		52	October 22, 2020	November 1, 2023	0.31
14	13 (Note: The second half of the season was split into a fifteenth season, bringing the number of episodes to 13.)		21	November 2, 2023	December 2, 2024	0.17
15	13		26	July 24, 2024	June 20, 2025	TBA
16	13		22	June 27, 2025	June 5, 2026	TBA
17	TBA		TBA	June 12, 2026	TBA	TBA

=== Home video ===
All SpongeBob SquarePants home video releases are distributed by Paramount Home Entertainment.

SpongeBob SquarePants DVD releases
Season	DVD release date		
Season	Region 1	Region 2	Region 4
1	October 28, 2003	November 7, 2005	November 30, 2006
2	October 19, 2004	October 23, 2006	November 30, 2006
3	September 27, 2005	December 3, 2007	November 8, 2007
4	September 12, 2006	November 3, 2008	November 7, 2008
4	January 9, 2007	November 3, 2008	November 7, 2008
5	September 4, 2007	November 16, 2009	December 3, 2009
5	November 18, 2008	November 16, 2009	December 3, 2009
6	December 8, 2009	November 29, 2010	December 2, 2010
6	December 7, 2010	November 29, 2010	December 2, 2010
7	December 6, 2011	September 17, 2012	September 12, 2012
8	March 12, 2013	October 28, 2013	October 30, 2013
9	October 10, 2017	TBA	October 7, 2020
10	October 15, 2019	TBA	October 7, 2020
11	March 31, 2020	TBA	October 7, 2020
12	January 12, 2021	TBA	TBA
13	December 5, 2023	TBA	TBA
14	November 19, 2024	TBA	TBA
15	November 11, 2025	TBA	TBA
16	November 3, 2026	TBA	TBA

=== Streaming ===
==== United States ====
In May 2013, a deal between Netflix and Viacom expired, which resulted in shows such as SpongeBob and Dora the Explorer being removed from Netflix in the United States, although SpongeBob continues to be available on Netflix in certain other regions. (Note: Attributed to multiple references:) In June of that year, Viacom announced a $200 million multi-year licensing agreement which would move its programs, including SpongeBob, to Amazon. (Note: Attributed to multiple references:) SpongeBob was available on Hulu from 2012 until 2016, and on Amazon Prime Video after the Netflix deal ended. In 2020, SpongeBob became available on Paramount+. As of June 2025, the first six seasons of the series are available on Amazon, and the first 14 seasons are available on Paramount+.

=== Anniversaries ===
Ten years. I never imagined working on the show to this date and this long...I really figured we might get a season and a cult following, and that might be it.

— Stephen Hillenburg

Nickelodeon began celebrating the series' 10th anniversary on January 18, 2009, with a live cast reading of the episode "SpongeBob vs. The Big One" at the Sundance Film Festival. (Note: Attributed to multiple references:) In July, the Madame Tussauds wax museum in New York unveiled a wax sculpture of SpongeBob, which made him the first animated character to be sculpted entirely out of wax. (Note: Attributed to multiple references:) A documentary about the series, Square Roots: The Story of SpongeBob SquarePants, premiered on VH1 on July 14. (Note: Attributed to multiple references:) Three days later, the network celebrated the series' official anniversary with a 50-hour television marathon titled "The Ultimate SpongeBob SpongeBash Weekend". It began with a new episode, "To SquarePants or Not to SquarePants". The marathon also featured a broadcast of The SpongeBob SquarePants Movie, a countdown of the top ten episodes as selected by fans, and the premiere of ten new episodes. (Note: Attributed to multiple references:) An eight-episode DVD set featuring "To SquarePants or Not to SquarePants" was released shortly after the marathon, and a 14-disc DVD set titled The First 100 Episodes was released in September. (Note: Attributed to multiple references:) On November 6, an hour-long television film, titled Truth or Square, debuted on Nickelodeon. The film is narrated by Ricky Gervais and features live-action cameo appearances by various celebrities. (Note: Attributed to multiple references:) It was released as part of a DVD set in November 2009.

In 2019, Nickelodeon honored the twentieth anniversary of SpongeBob with a series of celebrations known as the "Best Year Ever". Pantone created color shades known as "SpongeBob SquarePants Yellow" and "Patrick Star Pink" to be used by Nickelodeon's licensing partners. (Note: Attributed to multiple references:) SpongeBob-themed garments were presented during New York Fashion Week and Amsterdam Fashion Week, and Nike released a SpongeBob series of shoes, accessories, and apparel. (Note: Attributed to multiple references:) The "Best Year Ever" also included the launch of a SpongeBob-themed cosmetics line, an official SpongeBob YouTube channel and a mobile game based on the series. (Note: Attributed to multiple references:) On July 12, a television special titled SpongeBob's Big Birthday Blowout premiered. (Note: Attributed to multiple references:) On July 15, Amazon celebrated SpongeBob on Amazon Prime Day with the early release of a 30-disc DVD set, SpongeBob SquarePants: The Best 200 Episodes Ever! The 20th anniversary celebrations culminated with the August 14 release of The SpongeBob Movie: Sponge on the Run. (Note: Attributed to multiple references:)

A celebration of the series' 25th anniversary, known as "SpongeBob 25", began on July 13, 2024, with SpongeBob and Patrick hosting the Kids' Choice Awards. The following week, Nickelodeon released a series of specially produced anniversary episodes filled with Easter eggs and nods to previous fan-favorite moments, such as the return of character Kevin C. Cucumber and chronological throwbacks to classic episodes like "SpongeBob B.C." and "Pest of the West". A collaboration with Wendy's and other restaurants called the Krabby Patty Kollab began in October, in which the restaurants created real-life Krabby Patties. A one-hour television special, Kreepaway Kamp, premiered on October 10. A 44-disc DVD compilation of three box sets, titled SpongeBob SquarePants: The Best 300 Episodes Ever, was released on October 15.

== Reception ==
=== Critical response ===
Laura Fries of Variety described SpongeBob as thoughtful, inventive, charming, whimsical, and "clever enough" to appeal to teenagers and young adults as well as children. James Poniewozik of Time magazine and Joyce Millman of The New York Times also praised SpongeBob for appealing to both children and adults. In her 2001 review, Millman called SpongeBob "the most charming toon on television", describing SpongeBob himself as "darned lovable" and referring to his world as "excellently strange". She said that like Pee-wee's Playhouse, SpongeBob "joyfully dances on the fine line between childhood and adulthood, guilelessness and camp, the warped and the sweet." Robert Thompson, a professor of communications and director of the Center for the Study of Popular Television at Syracuse University, described the series as "a refreshing breath from the pre-irony era". He felt the show is subversive because it is deliberately naive, and since it is not trying to be hip or cool, "hipness can be grafted onto it". Bettijane Levine of the Los Angeles Times also acknowledged the series' appeal for adults, describing it as a "brain balm for stressed-out grown-ups".

=== Ratings and run-length achievements ===
Within its first month on the air, SpongeBob overtook Pokémon as the highest rated Saturday-morning children's series on television. It held an average national Nielsen rating of 4.9 among children aged two through eleven, denoting 1.9 million viewers. Two years later, the series had firmly established itself as Nickelodeon's second highest-rated children's program, after Rugrats. SpongeBob was credited with helping Nickelodeon take the "Saturday-morning ratings crown" for the third straight season in 2001. The series had gained a significant adult audience by that point—nearly 40 percent of its 2.2 million viewers were aged 18 to 34. In response to its weekend success, Nickelodeon gave SpongeBob time slots at 6:00 pm and 8:00 pm, Monday through Thursday, to increase the series' exposure. By the end of 2001, the show had the highest ratings for any children's series, on all of television. (Note: Attributed to multiple references:) Weekly viewership of the series had reached around fifteen million, at least five million of whom were adults.

In October 2002, the Nickelodeon children's series The Fairly OddParents briefly surpassed SpongeBob's 2.4 million child viewers aged two to eleven. Due to the climbing ratings of The Fairly OddParents, Nickelodeon installed it in an 8:00 PM time slot previously occupied by SpongeBob. In 2012, SpongeBob's viewership among children began to decline. Nielsen reported a 29% drop in viewership in the first quarter of 2012 compared with the previous year. John Jannarone of The Wall Street Journal suggested that the decline in viewership could be due to the age of the series, or to overexposure; with Nickelodeon frequently airing SpongeBob reruns, SpongeBob programming accounted for between 31 and 40% of the network's total programming in 2011. Media analyst Todd Juenger attributed the decline in network viewers to the availability of Nickelodeon content on streaming services such as Netflix. (Note: Attributed to multiple references:) A Nickelodeon spokesman denied that SpongeBob's decline was related to the channel's overall ratings.

SpongeBob is one of the longest-running series on Nickelodeon, and one of the longest-running American animated series on television. It became the Nickelodeon series with the most episodes during its eighth season, surpassing the 172 episodes of Rugrats, and in 2025 became the longest-running American children's animated series. According to CNN, SpongeBob has become a fixture in pop culture, especially among millennials.

=== Perceived decline in quality ===
In the mid-to-late 2000s, the tone and emphasis of the show began to change. Some media outlets including MSN, The A.V. Club, and Vulture commented on the show's perceived decline in quality, after Hillenburg's departure as showrunner following The SpongeBob SquarePants Movie in 2004. In 2012, MSN cited a post on Encyclopedia SpongeBobia, a Fandom-hosted wiki, which said that many fans felt the series had "jumped the shark" following the release of the film and that online fansites were becoming "deserted". In 2018, Vulture noted the most popular online memes of the series typically originated in episodes from the first three seasons. That same year, The A.V. Club wrote that as the series went on, "[it] leaned hard into kid-friendly physical humor and gross-out moments that appealed to no one in particular."

=== Social and political issues ===
SpongeBob has occasionally provoked public debates about social and political issues. In 2002, after The Wall Street Journal reported that SpongeBob was popular with gay men, Hillenburg stated that the character SpongeBob is not gay, but rather "somewhat asexual".

In 2005, an online video that included clips from SpongeBob and other children's shows set to the Sister Sledge song "We Are Family" was attacked by Focus on the Family, an American evangelical group. The group's founder, James Dobson, accused the video of promoting homosexuality because it was created by the We Are Family Foundation, a pro-tolerance group. (Note: Attributed to multiple references:) Following Dobson's accusation, John H. Thomas, the general minister and president of the United Church of Christ, stated that his ministry would welcome SpongeBob. He said, "Jesus didn't turn people away. Neither do we."

In his article "Queertoons", queer theorist Jeffery P. Dennis argues that SpongeBob and Patrick "are paired with arguably erotic intensity". (Note: Attributed to multiple references:) The Ukrainian organization Family Under the Protection of the Holy Virgin, which was described as a "fringe Catholic" group by The Wall Street Journal, tried to have SpongeBob banned for its alleged "promotion of homosexuality". Questions about SpongeBob's sexuality resurfaced in 2020 after Nickelodeon posted an image on Twitter of the character in rainbow colors and with text celebrating the LGBTQ+ community during Pride Month.

The season 9 episode "SpongeBob, You're Fired" (2013) was the subject of a debate in the media about government services. (Note: Attributed to multiple references:) In 2019, University of Washington professor Holly M. Barker wrote an article titled "Unsettling SpongeBob and the legacies of violence on Bikini Bottom". She argued that because Bikini Bottom is named after Bikini Atoll, where indigenous people were displaced by the U.S. government for nuclear testing, SpongeBob promotes "violent and racist" colonialism. (Note: Attributed to multiple references:)

In 2021, the season 3 episode "Mid-Life Crustacean" was removed from circulation. Popular speculation is that the removal is due to its ending in which SpongeBob, Patrick, and Mr. Krabs partake in a panty raid. The release of a season 12 episode, "Kwarantined Krab", was delayed for two years because its themes were reminiscent of the COVID-19 pandemic.

=== Effect on children ===
In 2006, the watchdog group Parents Television Council accused SpongeBob of promoting the use of profanity among children through the season 2 episode "Sailor Mouth".

A 2011 University of Virginia study published in the journal Pediatrics suggested that allowing preschool-aged children to watch SpongeBob caused short-term disruptions in mental function and attention span because of frequent shot changes, compared to control groups watching Caillou and drawing pictures. A Nickelodeon executive responded in an interview the series was not intended for an audience of that age and that the study used "questionable methodology and could not possibly provide the basis for any valid findings that parents could trust."

In 2014, Zabira Orazalieva, chairwoman of the Committee for the Protection of Children's Rights under the Kazakh Ministry of Education and Science, deemed the series too violent for children, labeling SpongeBob a "hooligan" who regularly misbehaves and enjoys inflicting physical violence on his neighbors.

== Accolades ==
SpongeBob has received four Emmy Awards, (Note: Attributed to multiple references:) six Annie Awards, (Note: Attributed to multiple references:) and two BAFTA Children's Awards. In 2006, IGN ranked SpongeBob the 15th best animated series of all time, and in 2013 it ranked the series 12th on its list of the Top 25 Animated Series for Adults. (Note: Attributed to multiple references:)

In 2007, Time television critic James Poniewozik ranked SpongeBob among the best 100 television series of all time. Viewers of UK television network Channel 4 voted SpongeBob the 28th Greatest Cartoon in a 2004 poll. In 2013, the publication ranked SpongeBob SquarePants eighth on its list of the Greatest TV Cartoons of All Time. Critics Alan Sepinwall and Matt Zoller Seitz ranked SpongeBob as the 22nd greatest American television series of all time in their 2016 book TV (The Book). (Note: Attributed to multiple references:)

== Franchise ==
=== Spin-offs ===
==== Kamp Koral: SpongeBob's Under Years ====
In June 2019, production began on a SpongeBob spin-off series titled Kamp Koral: SpongeBob's Under Years. The plot focuses on the adventures of a 10-year-old SpongeBob and his friends at a camp in the Kelp Forest, where they spend the summer catching jellyfish, building campfires, and swimming in Lake Yuckymuck. The series served as a tie-in to the animated film The SpongeBob Movie: Sponge on the Run (2020), and had the same executive producers as SpongeBob: Marc Ceccarelli, Jennie Monica, and Vincent Waller. Kamp Koral is produced using computer-generated animation (CGI) rather than the digital ink and paint animation used for SpongeBob. The series premiered on March 4, 2021, and a second season debuted on July 10, 2024.

==== The Patrick Star Show ====
On August 10, 2020, it was reported that a Patrick Star talk show titled The Patrick Star Show was in development with a 13-episode order. Additionally, it was reported that the show would be similar to other talk shows such as The Larry Sanders Show and Comedy Bang! Bang! The series premiered on Nickelodeon on July 9, 2021, with the series set to be available on Paramount+ sometime in the future.

Fans and former SpongeBob showrunner Paul Tibbitt criticized Nickelodeon when it greenlit spin-offs after the death of Hillenburg in 2018. In a tweet, Tibbit said Hillenburg would have hated the spin-offs, and he angrily admonished his former colleagues for working on them. In a 2009 interview, Hillenburg had been skeptical about the viability of spin-offs focusing on characters other than SpongeBob, and in 2017 Hillenburg's colleague Vincent Waller had stated that Hillenburg was against the creation of spin-offs.

=== Super Bowl ===
SpongeBob SquarePants first appeared in the Super Bowl during the Super Bowl LIII halftime show, making a cameo appearance in the form of a short animation featuring Squidward, Mr. Krabs, Mrs. Puff, SpongeBob, and Patrick Star, which included footage of the Bikini Bottom band from the episode Band Geeks, before segueing into Travis Scott's section of the performance. This led to fan outrage, as fans requested "Sweet Victory", the song featured in the episode, be played during the show, which ultimately did not occur. According to animator Nico Colaleo, the animation was completed in a few days.

On August 1, 2023, CBS Sports announced that it would carry a youth-oriented alternate broadcast of Super Bowl LVIII on Nickelodeon, the first such broadcast for a Super Bowl. Billed as Super Bowl LVIII: Live from Bikini Bottom, the broadcast incorporated SpongeBob-themed augmented reality effects and features (in addition to those seen on previous games aired by the network), and appearances by characters from the series (SpongeBob and Patrick acted as "analysts" alongside announcers Noah Eagle and Nate Burleson, with Sandy Cheeks taking on "sideline reporter" duties).

=== Comic books ===
The 32-page bimonthly comic book series, SpongeBob Comics, was announced in November 2010 and debuted the following February. Before this, SpongeBob SquarePants comics had been published in Nickelodeon Magazine, and episodes of the television series had been adapted by Cine-Manga, but SpongeBob Comics was the first American comic book series devoted solely to SpongeBob SquarePants. It also served as SpongeBob SquarePants creator Stephen Hillenburg's debut as a comic book author. The series was published by Hillenburg's production company, United Plankton Pictures, and distributed by Bongo Comics Group. Hillenburg described the stories from the comic books as "original and always true to the humor, characters, and universe of the SpongeBob SquarePants series." Leading up to the release of the series, Hillenburg said, "I'm hoping that fans will enjoy finally having a SpongeBob comic book from me."

Chris Duffy, the former senior editor of Nickelodeon Magazine, serves as managing editor of SpongeBob Comics. Hillenburg and Duffy met with various cartoonists—including James Kochalka, Hilary Barta, Graham Annable, Gregg Schigiel, and Jacob Chabot—to contribute to each issues. Retired horror comics writer and artist Stephen R. Bissette returned to write a special Halloween issue in 2012, with Tony Millionaire and Al Jaffee. In an interview with Tom Spurgeon, Bissette said, "I've even broken my retirement to do one work-for-hire gig [for SpongeBob Comics] so I could share everything about that kind of current job."

In the United Kingdom, Titan Magazines published comics based on SpongeBob SquarePants every four weeks from February 3, 2005, through November 28, 2013. Titan Magazines also teamed up with Lego to release a limited edition SpongeBob-themed comic.

=== Films ===
Six SpongeBob films have been released theatrically or via streaming services: The SpongeBob SquarePants Movie (2004), The SpongeBob Movie: Sponge Out of Water (2015), The SpongeBob Movie: Sponge on the Run (2020), Saving Bikini Bottom: The Sandy Cheeks Movie (2024), and Plankton: The Movie (2025), and The SpongeBob Movie: Search for SquarePants (2025). The series' regular voice actors have reprised their roles for each film.

==== Main series ====
The first SpongeBob film, The SpongeBob SquarePants Movie, an animated film adaptation of the series, was released on November 19, 2004. The film was directed by Hillenburg and written by long-time series writers Derek Drymon, Tim Hill, Kent Osborne, Aaron Springer, Paul Tibbitt, and Hillenburg. He and Julia Pistor produced the film, while Gregor Narholz composed the film's score. Its plot concerns Plankton's evil plan to steal King Neptune's crown and send it to Shell City. SpongeBob and Patrick must retrieve it and save Mr. Krabs' life from Neptune's raft and their home, Bikini Bottom, from Plankton's plan. It features guest appearances by Jeffrey Tambor as King Neptune, Scarlett Johansson as the King's daughter Mindy, Alec Baldwin as Dennis, and David Hasselhoff as himself. The film received a positive critical reception and was a box office success, grossing over $140 million worldwide.

A sequel to the 2004 film, The SpongeBob Movie: Sponge Out of Water, was released in theaters on February 6, 2015. The series' main cast members reprised their roles. The underwater parts are animated traditionally in the manner of the series—the live-action parts use CGI animation for the SpongeBob characters. The film had a budget similar to the previous film, costing less than $100 million to produce. It was met with positive reviews, and was also a financial success, grossing over $325.2 million worldwide.

A third film, The SpongeBob Movie: Sponge on the Run, was initially scheduled for a May 2020 release. However, due to the COVID-19 pandemic, the film faced multiple delays. In June 2020, its worldwide theatrical release was canceled, prompting Paramount to release the film as a launch-day exclusive for its premium video on demand and streaming service Paramount+ in the US on March 4, 2021. Internationally, Canada received a theatrical release on August 14, 2020, while Netflix acquired the streaming rights in foreign regions excluding the US, China, and Canada on November 5, 2020. Unlike the previous two films, this installment primarily uses stylized CGI animation. The film received mixed-to-positive reviews from critics, though audience reception was less favorable. The film grossed $4.8 million from its limited theatrical runs.

The SpongeBob Movie: Search for SquarePants had a world premiere at the AFI Film Festival on October 26, 2025. Its theatrical release was initially set for May 23, 2025, but was delayed until December 19. It is the fourth main SpongeBob film as well as the franchise's sixth film overall.

==== Spin-off films ====
Saving Bikini Bottom: The Sandy Cheeks Movie is an animated adventure comedy film released on Netflix on August 2, 2024. It is the first character-focused spin-off film, as well as the franchise's fourth film overall. It centers around Sandy and SpongeBob going on a mission to save Bikini Bottom, while a subplot centers on the latter's family's exploits in the Circus. Prior to its release, the entire film was leaked on January 21, 2024, as a video upload on X (the website formerly known as Twitter). The film received mixed reviews from critics.

Plankton: The Movie is an animated musical comedy film which was released on Netflix on March 7, 2025. It is the second character-focused spin-off film, and the fifth film in the franchise overall. As with the Sandy Cheeks Movie, the entire film was leaked onto X (Twitter) in August 2024.

Three television films were also released: SpongeBob's Atlantis SquarePantis (2007), SpongeBob's Truth or Square (2009), and SpongeBob's Big Birthday Blowout (2019).

=== Music ===
Collections of original music featured in the series have been released on the albums SpongeBob SquarePants: Original Theme Highlights (2001), SpongeBob's Greatest Hits (2009), and The Yellow Album (2005). The first two charted on the US Billboard 200, reaching number 171 and 122, respectively.

Several songs have been recorded for the purpose of a single or album release and have not been featured on the show. The song "My Tighty Whiteys" written by Tom Kenny and Andy Paley was released only on the album The Best Day Ever (2006). Kenny's inspiration for the song was "underwear humor," saying: "Underwear humor is always a surefire laugh-getter with kids ... Just seeing a character that odd wearing really prosaic, normal, Kmart, three-to-a-pack underwear is a funny drawing ... We thought it was funny to make a really lush, beautiful love song to his underwear."

A soundtrack album, The SpongeBob SquarePants Movie – Music from the Movie and More, featuring the film's score, was released along with the feature-length film in November 2004. Various artists including the Flaming Lips, Wilco, Ween, Motörhead, the Shins, and Avril Lavigne contributed to the soundtrack that reached number 76 on the US Billboard 200.

=== Theme park rides ===
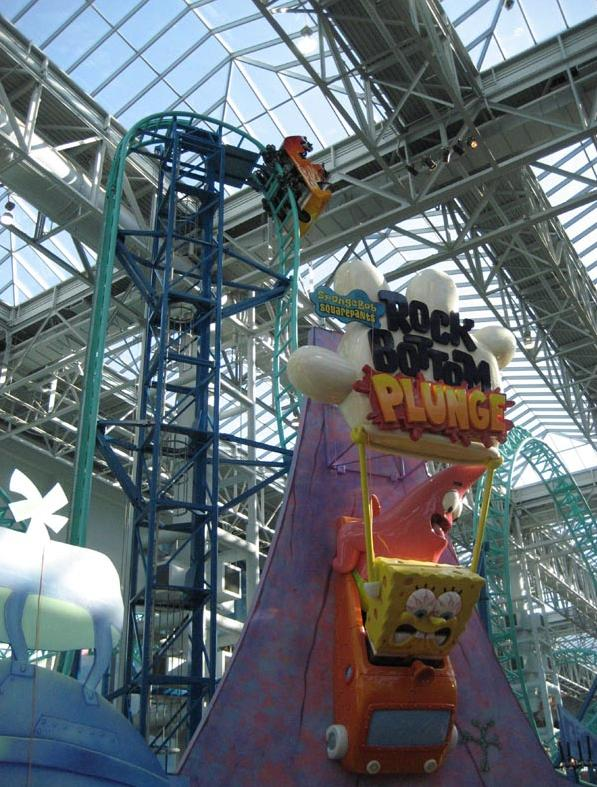
Entrance and lift hill of the SpongeBob SquarePants Rock Bottom Plunge ride at the Mall of America

A SpongeBob SquarePants 4-D film and ride opened at several locations, including Six Flags Over Texas, Flamingo Land Resort, and the Shedd Aquarium. The ride features water squirts, real bubbles, and other sensory features. In 2012, Nickelodeon teamed up again with SimEx-Iwerks Entertainment and Super 78 to produce SpongeBob SquarePants 4-D: The Great Jelly Rescue. The attraction opened in early 2013 at the Mystic Aquarium & Institute for Exploration. It was also installed at the Nickelodeon Suites Resort Orlando in Orlando, Florida. The seven-minute film follows SpongeBob, Patrick, and Sandy rescuing the jellyfish of Jellyfish Fields from Plankton's evil clutches. On May 23, 2015, an interactive 3D show titled SpongeBob SubPants Adventure opened in Texas at Moody Gardens. The show was replaced with a generic "20,000 Leagues Under the Sea" re-theme in 2019. A dark ride shooter attraction titled SpongeBob's Crazy Carnival Ride opened at the Circus Circus Resort in Las Vegas, Nevada in 2024.

A variety of SpongeBob SquarePants-related attractions are currently located within Nickelodeon themed-areas at Movie Park Germany, Pleasure Beach Blackpool, Sea World, American Dream Meadowlands, and Mall of America, which includes the SpongeBob SquarePants Rock Bottom Plunge euro-fighter roller coaster.

In 2026, the Universal Kids Resort in Frisco, Texas opened "Nickelodeon's SpongeBob SquarePants Bikini Bottom", a themed area with four rides.

=== Video games ===
Numerous video games based on the series have been produced. Some of the early games include: Legend of the Lost Spatula (2001) and SpongeBob SquarePants: Battle for Bikini Bottom (2003). In 2013, Nickelodeon published and distributed SpongeBob Moves In!, a freemium city-building game app developed by Kung Fu Factory for iOS and Android. On June 5, 2019, THQ Nordic announced SpongeBob SquarePants: Battle for Bikini Bottom – Rehydrated, a full remake of the console versions of the original 2003 game. The game was released one year later on June 23, 2020 and includes cut content from the original game. On May 28, 2020, Apple Arcade released a game called SpongeBob SquarePants: Patty Pursuit. in 2021, EA Sports introduced a SpongeBob-themed level to the Yard section of its Madden NFL 21 video game.

On September 17, 2021, THQ Nordic announced SpongeBob Squarepants: The Cosmic Shake, a new original game based on the franchise, which was released on January 31, 2023. It was followed by a sequel, SpongeBob SquarePants: Titans of the Tide, released on November 18, 2025.

=== SpongeBob SquareShorts ===
Nickelodeon launched the first global SpongeBob SquarePants-themed short film competition, SpongeBob SquareShorts: Original Fan Tributes, in 2013. The contest encouraged fans and filmmakers around the world to create original short films inspired by SpongeBob for a chance to win a prize and a trip for four people to a screening event in Hollywood. The contest opened on May 6 and ran through June 28, 2013. On July 19, 2013, Nickelodeon announced the competition's finalists. On August 13, 2013, the under-18 category was won by David of the United States for his The Krabby Commercial, while the Finally Home short by Nicole of South Africa won the 18 and over category.

=== Theater ===
SpongeBob was adapted as a stage musical, SpongeBob SquarePants, The Broadway Musical, by director Tina Landau. It premiered in Chicago in 2016 and opened on Broadway at the Palace Theatre on December 4, 2017. It received twelve award nominations at the 72nd Tony Awards in 2018.

== Merchandise ==
A set of SpongeBob SquarePants figures modeled after the main characters

By the time the SpongeBob franchise celebrated its 25th anniversary in 2024, it had generated $16 billion in retail sales. In 2002, SpongeBob dolls sold at a rate of 75,000 per week—faster than the popular Tickle Me Elmo dolls were selling at the time. By 2007, SpongeBob merchandise was gaining popularity in Japan, thanks to a carefully orchestrated marketing campaign targeting young women. Popular board games such as Monopoly, Life, Operation, Ants in the Pants, and Yahtzee have been given SpongeBob-themed editions. SpongeBob toys have been included with children's meals at fast food restaurants around the world. SpongeBob-themed snacks, drinks, bottled water and ice cream have been produced. As part of an initiative to encourage children to eat vegetables, SpongeBob was featured on cans of Green Giant food products.

Imation Enterprises released SpongeBob-themed electronics, Build-A-Bear Workshop produced a SpongeBob collection, (Note: Attributed to multiple references:) and Simmons Jewelry Co. released a $75,000 diamond pendant as part of a SpongeBob line. SpongeBob has appeared as a guest character in the video games Nicktoons Unite! and Nicktoons MLB, and in the video game franchise Nick All-Star Brawl. SpongeBob skins are available in the mobile games Stumble Guys and Brawl Stars.

In 2013, Toyota unveiled a SpongeBob-inspired Toyota Highlander sport utility vehicle on what was dubbed "SpongeBob Day". (Note: Attributed to multiple references:) In 2024, Nickelodeon collaborated with the fast food chain Wendy's to create "Krabby Patty Kollab" meals. The meals included a "Krabby Patty", which was a regular Wendy's burger with a special sauce. The promotion was criticized by some fans for allegedly going against Hillenburg's wishes of not selling SpongeBob-themed fast food. In 2019, Nickelodeon released a series of toys inspired by various SpongeBob Internet memes. (Note: Attributed to multiple references:) The studio has also included references to well-known memes in SpongeBob video games.

In 2025, Wizards of the Coast released a limited edition set of SpongeBob-themed cards for its trading card game Magic: The Gathering, while the clothing brands Uniqlo and Cactus Plant Flea Market collaborated to produce SpongeBob-inspired garments. (Note: Attributed to multiple references:) The same year, the United States Postal Service released a series of SpongeBob-themed stamps. (Note: Attributed to multiple references:)

On September 15, 2026, McDonald's released Happy Meal toys in collaboration with SpongeBob and the anime/manga series One Piece. This set of toys featured SpongeBob characters dressed like characters from One Piece. Examples include SpongeBob dressed as Monkey D. Luffy (and a variant featuring Luffy's Gear 5 form), Squidward Tentacles as Sanji, Patrick Star as Roronoa Zoro, and Sandy Cheeks as Nami. Fans enjoyed the collaboration, mentioning how the pairings of each character were accurate to the lore of both shows. Alongside the Happy Meal, an animated intro was created as promotional material for the crossover. This intro was directed by Parker Simmons, the creator of Mao Mao: Heroes of Pure Heart.

== Cultural impact ==
SpongeBob has become an icon in Tahrir Square in Cairo, Egypt. After the Egyptian Revolution of 2011, the character became a fashion trend, appearing on various garments from hijabs to boxer shorts. Daniel Kohn of Vice wondered whether SpongeBob had become a symbol of resistance during political turmoil. The Egyptian-American filmmaker Sherief Elkeshta questioned why the images of SpongeBob did not show him holding a Molotov cocktail, or at least raising a fist. The ubiquity of SpongeBob led to the creation of a Tumblr project called "SpongeBob on the Nile", which was founded by two American students, and which attempts to document every appearance of SpongeBob in Egypt. There is also evidence of the phenomenon in Libya, where a rebel in SpongeBob attire was photographed celebrating the revolution. Although Patrick Kingsley of The Guardian stated that the trend has no political significance, facetious presidential campaigns have been launched for SpongeBob in Egypt and Syria.

In 2014, a SpongeBob-themed eatery opened in Ramallah, West Bank, Palestine. The restaurant is modeled after the Krusty Krab and serves Krabby Patties.

Following Hillenburg's death in November 2018, more than 1.2 million fans signed a petition for the National Football League to have the song "Sweet Victory" from the season 2 episode "Band Geeks" performed in his honor at the Super Bowl LIII halftime show. While the song's opening was ultimately included, it served as a transition into the performance of rapper Travis Scott. In response to fans' disappointment at not hearing the complete song, the Dallas Stars of the National Hockey League showed a clip of the full song during a game at the American Airlines Center. An animated remake of "Sweet Victory" opened Nickelodeon's broadcast of Super Bowl LVIII, implementing clips of the 2023 San Francisco 49ers and 2023 Kansas City Chiefs during the performance.

In honor of Hillenburg, a nonprofit fan project titled The SpongeBob SquarePants Movie Rehydrated was released online on May 1, 2022. It consists of a re-creation of the SpongeBob SquarePants Movie, reanimated by 300 people with re-recorded music and dialogue. Amid the YouTube premiere, the video was taken down by Paramount Global due to copyright laws. As a result, the hashtag #JusticeForSpongeBob trended on Twitter against Paramount's action. The video was restored the following day.

SpongeBob has been viewed in at least 170 countries and has been available in at least 24 languages.

=== SpongeBob in Internet culture ===
Online memes related to SpongeBob have achieved widespread popularity on the Internet, with Aja Romano of Vox declaring in 2019 that "Spongebob memes came to rule Internet culture". A subreddit devoted to memes based on the animated series has, as of May 2019, accumulated over 1.7 million subscribers, a figure much higher than subreddits devoted to the series itself.

Matt Schimkowitz, a senior editor for Know Your Meme, told Time magazine that a combination of factors make SpongeBob memes so popular. He speculated that nostalgia for the past, alongside the cartoon's young audience, contributed to SpongeBob SquarePants' outsized presence in Internet meme culture. Schimkowitz further added that memes derived from the series are exceptionally good at expressing emotions. Michael Gold of The New York Times opined that because of the show's "high episode count" and that it was "so ubiquitous at the beginning of the 21st century", SpongeBob SquarePants became "easy meme fodder".

Among the show's most popular memes are the mocking SpongeBob meme, referring to an image macro from the episode "Little Yellow Book", an image of Spongebob appearing exhausted in the episode "Nature Pants", and a particularly disheveled illustration of Squidward from "Squid's Day Off".

Fans of the show have created various pages replicating Bikini Bottom News, a news show within the SpongeBob universe, with versions of the anchors Realistic Fish Head and Perch Perkins generated with artificial intelligence.
