= List of SpongeBob SquarePants episodes (seasons 11–present) =

Episode list for an animated series

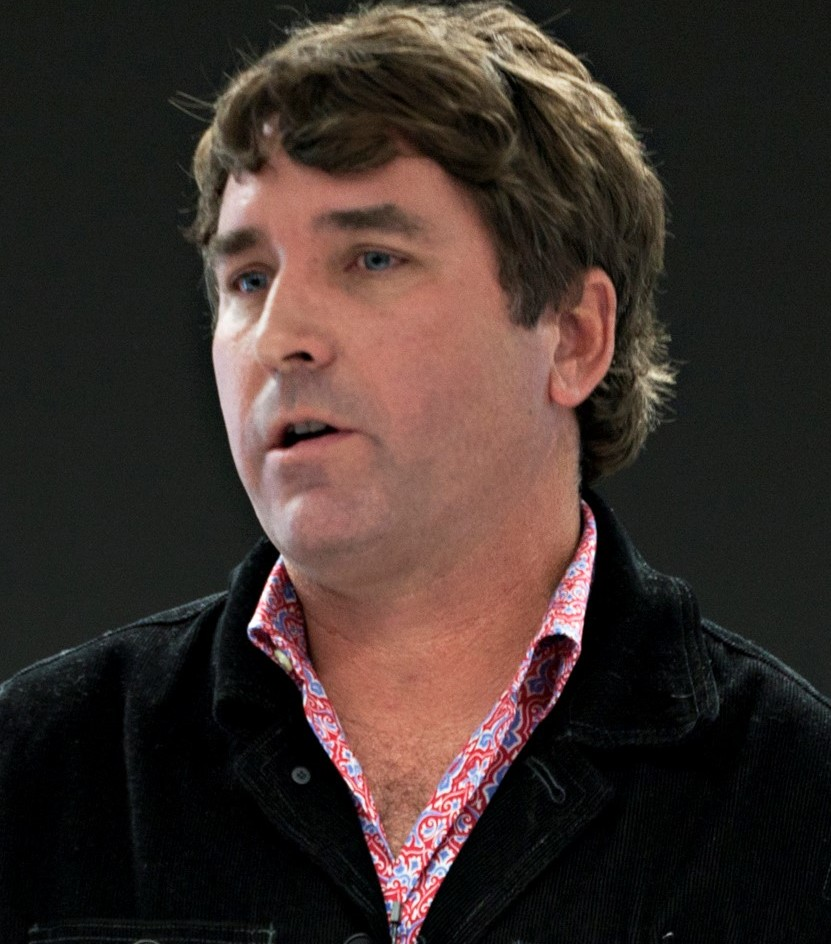
Stephen Hillenburg, shown here in 2011, created SpongeBob SquarePants, which premiered on May 1, 1999.

SpongeBob SquarePants is an American animated television series created by marine biologist and animator Stephen Hillenburg that premiered on Nickelodeon on May 1, 1999. The series is set in the fictional underwater city of Bikini Bottom, and centers on the adventures and endeavors of SpongeBob SquarePants, an enthusiastic and optimistic sea sponge. Many of the ideas for the show originated in an unpublished, educational comic book titled The Intertidal Zone, which Hillenburg created in the mid-1980s. He began developing SpongeBob SquarePants into a television series in 1996 after the cancellation of Rocko's Modern Life, another Nickelodeon television series that Hillenburg previously directed.

As of November 13, 2026, 344 episodes of SpongeBob SquarePants have aired, currently in its seventeenth season. The seventeenth season premiered on June 12, 2026. On June 9, 2026, the series was renewed for an eighteenth and nineteenth season.

Six theatrical and streaming films have been released as of 2025, including The SpongeBob SquarePants Movie (2004), The SpongeBob Movie: Sponge Out of Water (2015), The SpongeBob Movie: Sponge on the Run (2020), Saving Bikini Bottom: The Sandy Cheeks Movie (2024), Plankton: The Movie (2025), and The SpongeBob Movie: Search for SquarePants (2025).

Atlantis SquarePantis, a television film guest starring David Bowie, debuted as part of the fifth season. In 2009, Nickelodeon celebrated the show's tenth anniversary with Square Roots: The Story of SpongeBob SquarePants and SpongeBob's Truth or Square. In 2019, Nickelodeon celebrated the show's twentieth anniversary with SpongeBob's Big Birthday Blowout, a television film.

Episodes of SpongeBob SquarePants have been nominated for a variety of different awards, including 17 Annie Awards (with six wins), 17 Golden Reel Awards (with eight wins), 15 Emmy Awards (with one win), 23 Kids' Choice Awards (with 22 wins), and four BAFTA Children's Awards (with two wins). Several compilation DVDs have been released. In addition, the first fifteen seasons have been released on DVD, and are available for Regions 1, 2 and 4 as of November 11, 2025.

== Series overview ==
Season	Episodes		Segments	Originally released		Avg. viewers (millions)
Season	Episodes		Segments	First released	Last released	Avg. viewers (millions)
1	20		41	May 1, 1999	March 3, 2001	2.65
2	20		39	October 20, 2000	July 26, 2003	2.88
3	20		37	October 5, 2001	October 11, 2004	4.42
4	20		38	May 6, 2005	July 24, 2007	3.86
5	20		41	February 19, 2007	July 19, 2009	4.11
6	26		47	March 3, 2008	July 5, 2010	4.09
7	26		50	July 19, 2009	June 11, 2011	4.54
8	26		47	March 26, 2011	December 6, 2012	3.26
9	26	11	20	July 21, 2012	March 29, 2015	2.79
9	26	15	29	July 16, 2015	February 20, 2017	2.79
10	11		22	October 15, 2016	December 2, 2017	1.95
11	26		50	June 24, 2017	November 25, 2018	1.54
12	26		48	November 11, 2018	April 29, 2022	0.95
13	26		52	October 22, 2020	November 1, 2023	0.31
14	13 (Note: The second half of the season was split into a fifteenth season, bringing the number of episodes to 13.)		21	November 2, 2023	December 2, 2024	0.17
15	13		26	July 24, 2024	June 20, 2025	TBA
16	13		22	June 27, 2025	June 5, 2026	TBA
17	TBA		TBA	June 12, 2026	TBA	TBA

== Episodes ==
=== Season 11 (2017–18) ===
The eleventh season of SpongeBob SquarePants consists of 26 episodes (50 segments), which are ordered below according to Nickelodeon's packaging order, and not their original production or broadcast order.

No. overall	No. in season	Title	Directed by (Note: Information is taken from the opening credits of each episode.)	Written by	Original release date	Prod. code	U.S. viewers (millions)
216	1	"Cave Dwelling Sponge"	Alan Smart (animation), Dave Cunningham (supervising)	Written by : Mr. Lawrence; Storyboarded by : Brian Morante	September 23, 2017	325–1102	1.92
216	1	"The Clam Whisperer"	Bob Jaques (animation), Adam Paloian (supervising)	Written by : Ben Gruber; Storyboarded by : John Trabbic	September 23, 2017	325–1106	1.92
217	2	"Spot Returns"	Tom Yasumi (animation), Sherm Cohen (supervising)	Written by : Andrew Goodman; Storyboarded by : John Trabbic	June 24, 2017	325–1101	1.96
217	2	"The Check-Up"	Tom Yasumi (animation), Sherm Cohen (supervising)	Written by : Andrew Goodman; Storyboarded by : John Trabbic	June 24, 2017	325–1103	1.96
218	3	"Spin the Bottle"	Bob Jaques (animation), Adam Paloian (supervising)	Written by : Kaz; Storyboarded by : Fred Osmond	July 16, 2017	325–1107	1.99
218	3	"There's a Sponge in My Soup"	Tom Yasumi (animation), Dave Cunningham (supervising)	Written by : Kaz; Storyboarded by : Kelly Armstrong	November 7, 2017	325–1104	1.46
219	4	"Man Ray Returns"	Alan Smart and Tom Yasumi (animation), Adam Paloian (supervising)	Written by : Kaz; Storyboarded by : John Trabbic	September 30, 2017	325–1115	2.07
219	4	"Larry the Floor Manager"	Bob Jaques (animation), Sherm Cohen (supervising)	Written by : Ben Gruber; Storyboarded by : Fred Osmond	September 30, 2017	325–1105	2.07
220	5	"The Legend of Boo-Kini Bottom"	Mark Caballero and Seamus Walsh; Tom Yasumi (timing); Adam Paloian (supervising)	Written by : Mr. Lawrence; Storyboarded by : Brian Morante and Sally Cruikshank	October 13, 2017	325–1109	2.21
220	5	"The Legend of Boo-Kini Bottom"	Mark Caballero and Seamus Walsh; Tom Yasumi (timing); Adam Paloian (supervising)	Written by : Mr. Lawrence; Storyboarded by : Brian Morante and Sally Cruikshank	October 13, 2017	325–1110	2.21
221	6	"No Pictures Please"	Tom Yasumi (animation), Dave Cunningham (supervising)	Written by : Mr. Lawrence; Storyboarded by : Fred Osmond	November 6, 2017	325–1117	1.84
221	6	"Stuck on the Roof"	Bob Jaques (animation), Sherm Cohen (supervising)	Written by : Andrew Goodman; Storyboarded by : Kelly Armstrong	November 6, 2017	325–1108	1.84
222	7	"Krabby Patty Creature Feature"	Alan Smart (animation), Adam Paloian (supervising)	Written by : Chris Allison, Ryan Kramer and Kaz; Storyboarded by : Chris Allison and Ryan Kramer	October 21, 2017	325–1119	1.99
222	7	"Teacher's Pests"	Tom Yasumi (animation), Dave Cunningham (supervising)	Written by : Ben Gruber; Storyboarded by : John Trabbic	October 21, 2017	325–1118	1.99
223	8	"Sanitation Insanity"	Alan Smart (animation), Sherm Cohen (supervising)	Written by : Ben Gruber; Storyboarded by : Brian Morante	May 7, 2018	325–1111	1.35
223	8	"Bunny Hunt"	Bob Jaques (animation), Adam Paloian (supervising)	Written by : Mr. Lawrence; Storyboarded by : Fred Osmond	March 30, 2018	325–1114	1.44
224	9	"Squid Noir"	Alan Smart and Tom Yasumi (animation), Dave Cunningham (supervising)	Written by : Andrew Goodman; Storyboarded by : John Trabbic	November 10, 2017	325–1122	1.86
224	9	"Scavenger Pants"	Bob Jaques (animation), Sherm Cohen (supervising)	Written by : Luke Brookshier; Storyboarded by : Brian Morante	November 9, 2017	325–1116	1.65
225	10	"Cuddle E. Hugs"	Alan Smart and Tom Yasumi (animation), Adam Paloian (supervising)	Written by : Ben Gruber; Storyboarded by : Kelly Armstrong	November 8, 2017	325–1124	1.65
225	10	"Pat the Horse"	Bob Jaques (animation), Dave Cunningham (supervising)	Written by : Kaz; Storyboarded by : Fred Osmond	December 2, 2017	325–1129	1.83
226	11	"Chatterbox Gary"	Tom Yasumi (animation), Sherm Cohen (supervising)	Written by : Luke Brookshier; Storyboarded by : John Trabbic	February 12, 2018	325–1123	1.70
226	11	"Don't Feed the Clowns"	Alan Smart (animation), Adam Paloian (supervising)	Written by : Mr. Lawrence; Storyboarded by : Brian Morante	February 12, 2018	325–1125	1.70
227	12	"Drive Happy"	Alan Smart (animation), Adam Paloian (supervising)	Written by : Kaz; Storyboarded by : Brian Morante	February 13, 2018	325–1136	1.63
227	12	"Old Man Patrick"	Bob Jaques (animation), Dave Cunningham (supervising)	Written by : Kaz; Storyboarded by : Fred Osmond	February 14, 2018	325–1132	1.63
228	13	"Fun-Sized Friends"	Tom Yasumi (animation), Sherm Cohen (supervising)	Written by : Andrew Goodman; Storyboarded by : Kelly Armstrong	February 15, 2018	325–1130	1.97
228	13	"Grandmum's the Word"	Tom Yasumi (animation), Dave Cunningham (supervising)	Written by : Mr. Lawrence; Storyboarded by : John Trabbic	February 16, 2018	325–1131	1.45
229	14	"Doodle Dimension"	Bob Jaques (animation), Sherm Cohen (supervising)	Written by : Luke Brookshier; Storyboarded by : John Trabbic	March 9, 2018	325–1133	1.30
229	14	"Moving Bubble Bass"	Alan Smart and Tom Yasumi (animation), Adam Paloian (supervising)	Written by : Mr. Lawrence; Storyboarded by : Fred Osmond	March 16, 2018	325–1141	1.35
230	15	"High Sea Diving"	Bob Jaques (animation), Dave Cunningham (supervising)	Written by : Kaz; Storyboarded by : Brian Morante	April 6, 2018	325–1138	1.21
230	15	"Bottle Burglars"	Alan Smart and Tom Yasumi (animation), Adam Paloian (supervising)	Written by : Luke Brookshier; Storyboarded by : John Trabbic	April 13, 2018	325–1135	1.23
231	16	"My Leg!"	Alan Smart and Tom Yasumi (animation), Adam Paloian (supervising)	Written by : Mr. Lawrence; Storyboarded by : Fred Osmond	May 8, 2018	325–1143	1.24
231	16	"Ink Lemonade"	Bob Jaques (animation), Dave Cunningham (supervising)	Written by : Kaz; Storyboarded by : Kelly Armstrong	May 9, 2018	325–1142	1.31
232	17	"Mustard O' Mine"	Alan Smart and Tom Yasumi (animation), Adam Paloian (supervising)	Written by : Kaz; Storyboarded by : Brian Morante	May 10, 2018	325–1147	1.30
232	17	"Shopping List"	Alan Smart and Tom Yasumi (animation), Sherm Cohen (supervising)	Written by : Zeus Cervas; Storyboarded by : Zeus Cervas	September 24, 2018	325–1140	1.08
233	18	"Whale Watching"	Bob Jaques (animation), Dave Cunningham (supervising)	Written by : Andrew Goodman; Storyboarded by : John Trabbic	August 6, 2018	325–1144	1.59
233	18	"Krusty Kleaners"	Alan Smart (animation), Sherm Cohen (supervising)	Written by : Kaz; Storyboarded by : Brian Morante	August 7, 2018	325–1151	1.40
234	19	"Patnocchio"	Tom Yasumi (animation), Adam Paloian (supervising)	Written by : Mr. Lawrence; Storyboarded by : Fred Osmond	August 8, 2018	325–1146	1.22
234	19	"ChefBob"	Alan Smart (animation), Dave Cunningham (supervising)	Written by : Kaz; Storyboarded by : Kelly Armstrong	August 9, 2018	325–1145	1.04
235	20	"Plankton Paranoia"	Tom Yasumi (animation), Adam Paloian (supervising)	Written by : Luke Brookshier; Storyboarded by : John Trabbic	September 26, 2018	325–1139	1.18
235	20	"Library Cards"	Bob Jaques (animation), Sherm Cohen (supervising)	Written by : Mr. Lawrence; Storyboarded by : Fred Osmond	September 25, 2018	325–1152	1.25
236	21	"Call the Cops"	Bob Jaques (animation), Sherm Cohen (supervising)	Written by : Kaz; Storyboarded by : John Trabbic	September 27, 2018	325–1157	1.19
236	21	"Surf N' Turf"	Alan Smart (animation), Dave Cunningham (supervising)	Written by : Kaz; Storyboarded by : Zeus Cervas	November 11, 2018	325–1156	1.40
237	22	"Goons on the Moon" "SpaceBob MerryPants"	Alan Smart and Tom Yasumi (animation), Dave Cunningham and Adam Paloian (supervising)	Written by : Kaz; Storyboarded by : Brian Morante	November 25, 2018	325–1120	1.34
237	22	"Goons on the Moon" "SpaceBob MerryPants"	Alan Smart and Tom Yasumi (animation), Dave Cunningham and Adam Paloian (supervising)	Written by : Kaz; Storyboarded by : Brian Morante	November 25, 2018	325–1121	1.34
238	23	"Appointment TV"	Bob Jaques (animation), Sherm Cohen (supervising)	Written by : Andrew Goodman; Storyboarded by : John Trabbic	October 28, 2018	325–1127	1.25
238	23	"Karen's Virus"	Alan Smart and Tom Yasumi (animation), Adam Paloian (supervising)	Written by : Kaz; Storyboarded by : Fred Osmond	November 4, 2018	325–1112	1.20
239	24	"The Grill is Gone"	Alan Smart (animation), Adam Paloian (supervising)	Written by : Andrew Goodman; Storyboarded by : Fred Osmond	October 21, 2018	325–1148	1.37
239	24	"The Night Patty"	Bob Jaques (animation), Dave Cunningham (supervising)	Written by : Luke Brookshier; Storyboarded by : Kelly Armstrong	October 21, 2018	325–1150	1.37
240	25	"Bubbletown"	Alan Smart and Tom Yasumi (animation), Dave Cunningham (supervising)	Written by : Andrew Goodman and John Trabbic; Storyboarded by : John Trabbic	October 28, 2018	325–1113	1.25
240	25	"Girls' Night Out"	Bob Jaques (animation), Sherm Cohen (supervising)	Written by : Mr. Lawrence; Storyboarded by : Brian Morante	November 4, 2018	325–1158	1.20
241	26	"Squirrel Jelly"	Tom Yasumi (animation), Sherm Cohen and Adam Paloian (supervising)	Written by : Kaz and Zeus Cervas; Storyboarded by : Brian Morante	November 18, 2018	325–1137 325–1155	1.38
241	26	"The String"	Alan Smart and Tom Yasumi (animation), Adam Paloian (supervising)	Written by : Fred Osmond; Storyboarded by : Fred Osmond	November 18, 2018	325–1159 (Note: Originally #325–1215.)	1.38

=== Season 12 (2018–22) ===
The twelfth season of SpongeBob SquarePants consists of 26 episodes (48 segments), including 5 specials, which are ordered according to Nickelodeon's packaging order, and not their original production or broadcast order. This was the last season that series creator Stephen Hillenburg was involved in, before his death from amyotrophic lateral sclerosis on November 26, 2018, at age 57.

No. overall	No. in season	Title	Directed by	Written by	Original release date	U.S. viewers (millions)
242	1	"FarmerBob"	Alan Smart (animation), Dave Cunningham (supervising)	Written by : Luke Brookshier; Storyboarded by : John Trabbic (director)	November 11, 2018	1.40
242	1	"Gary & Spot"	Andrew Overtoom (animation), Sherm Cohen (supervising)	Written by : Andrew Goodman; Storyboarded by : Brian Morante (director)	July 27, 2019	1.21
243	2	"The Nitwitting"	Tom Yasumi (animation), Adam Paloian (supervising)	Written by : Kaz; Storyboarded by : Kelly Armstrong (director)	January 13, 2019	1.05
243	2	"The Ballad of Filthy Muck"	Alan Smart (animation), Dave Cunningham (supervising)	Written by : Kaz; Storyboarded by : Fred Osmond (director)	January 20, 2019	0.95
244	3	"The Krusty Slammer"	Andrew Overtoom (animation), Sherm Cohen (supervising)	Written by : Andrew Goodman; Storyboarded by : John Trabbic (director)	January 27, 2019	1.24
244	3	"Pineapple RV"	Tom Yasumi (animation), Adam Paloian (supervising)	Written by : Luke Brookshier; Storyboarded by : Brian Morante (director)	July 17, 2020	0.73
245	4	"Gary's Got Legs"	Andrew Overtoom (animation), Dave Cunningham (supervising)	Written by : Luke Brookshier; Storyboarded by : Fred Osmond (director)	July 27, 2019	1.21
245	4	"King Plankton"	Alan Smart (animation), Sherm Cohen (supervising)	Written by : Kaz; Storyboarded by : John Trabbic (director)	June 22, 2019	0.97
246	5	"Plankton's Old Chum"	Andrew Overtoom (animation), Dave Cunningham (supervising)	Written by : Kaz; Storyboarded by : Fred Osmond (director)	November 30, 2019	1.10
246	5	"Stormy Weather"	Tom Yasumi (animation), Adam Paloian (supervising)	Written by : Mr. Lawrence; Storyboarded by : Brian Morante (director)	June 22, 2019	0.97
247	6	"Swamp Mates"	Tom Yasumi (animation), Sherm Cohen (supervising)	Written by : Luke Brookshier; Storyboarded by : Benjamin Arcand (director)	April 11, 2020	0.89
247	6	"One Trick Sponge"	Andrew Overtoom (animation), Sherm Cohen (supervising)	Written by : Mr. Lawrence; Storyboarded by : John Trabbic (director)	April 11, 2020	0.89
248	7	"The Krusty Bucket"	Tom Yasumi (animation), Dave Cunningham (supervising)	Written by : Mr. Lawrence; Storyboarded by : John Trabbic (director)	August 10, 2019	1.09
248	7	"Squid's on a Bus"	Andrew Overtoom (animation), Sherm Cohen (supervising)	Written by : Kaz; Storyboarded by : Brian Morante (director)	September 28, 2019	1.28
249	8	"Sandy's Nutty Nieces"	Michelle Bryan and Alan Smart (animation), Adam Paloian (supervising)	Written by : Luke Brookshier; Storyboarded by : Fred Osmond (director)	June 29, 2019	0.94
249	8	"Insecurity Guards"	Tom Yasumi (animation), Dave Cunningham (supervising)	Written by : Luke Brookshier; Storyboarded by : John Trabbic (director)	June 29, 2019	0.94
250	9	"Broken Alarm"	Alan Smart (animation), Adam Paloian (supervising)	Written by : Ben Gruber; Storyboarded by : Kelly Armstrong (director)	July 6, 2019	1.36
250	9	"Karen's Baby"	Andrew Overtoom (animation), Sherm Cohen (supervising)	Written by : Ben Gruber; Storyboarded by : Kelly Armstrong (director)	August 10, 2019	1.09
251	10	"Shell Games"	Tom Yasumi (animation), Dave Cunningham (supervising)	Written by : Andrew Goodman; Storyboarded by : Fred Osmond (director)	March 7, 2020	0.80
251	10	"Senior Discount"	Michelle Bryan, Alan Smart, and Tom Yasumi (animation), Sherm Cohen (supervising)	Written by : Andrew Goodman; Storyboarded by : John Trabbic (director)	July 6, 2019	1.36
252	11	"Mind the Gap"	Andrew Overtoom (animation), Adam Paloian (supervising)	Written by : Mr. Lawrence; Storyboarded by : Brian Morante (director)	September 14, 2019	1.14
252	11	"Dirty Bubble Returns"	Tom Yasumi (animation), Dave Cunningham (supervising)	Written by : Mr. Lawrence; Storyboarded by : Kelly Armstrong (director)	November 23, 2019	1.07
253	12	"Jolly Lodgers"	Andrew Overtoom (animation), Adam Paloian (supervising)	Written by : Kaz; Storyboarded by : John Trabbic (director)	March 7, 2020	0.80
253	12	"Biddy Sitting"	Michelle Bryan and Alan Smart (animation), Sherm Cohen (supervising)	Written by : Kaz; Storyboarded by : Mark Ackland (director)	February 8, 2020	0.94
254 (Note: Alternatively listed under the syndication number #893.)	13	"SpongeBob's Big Birthday Blowout"	Jonas Morganstein; Michelle Bryan, Alan Smart, and Tom Yasumi (animation), Sherm Cohen, Dave Cunningham, and Adam Paloian (supervising)	Written by : Kaz and Mr. Lawrence; Storyboarded by : Brian Morante and Fred Osmond (supervisors)	July 12, 2019	1.83
255	14	"SpongeBob's Big Birthday Blowout"	Jonas Morganstein; Michelle Bryan, Alan Smart, and Tom Yasumi (animation), Sherm Cohen, Dave Cunningham, and Adam Paloian (supervising)	Written by : Kaz and Mr. Lawrence; Storyboarded by : Brian Morante and Fred Osmond (supervisors)	July 12, 2019	1.83
256	15	"SpongeBob in RandomLand"	Michelle Bryan and Alan Smart (animation), Adam Paloian (supervising)	Written by : Kaz; Storyboarded by : Fred Osmond (director)	September 21, 2019	1.43
256	15	"SpongeBob's Bad Habit"	Andrew Overtoom (animation), Dave Cunningham (supervising)	Written by : Luke Brookshier; Storyboarded by : Kelly Armstrong (director)	September 21, 2019	1.43
257	16	"Handemonium"	Alan Smart and Tom Yasumi (animation), Adam Paloian and Sherm Cohen (supervising)	Written by : Mr. Lawrence; Storyboarded by : Brian Morante (director)	November 23, 2019	1.07
257	16	"Breakin'"	Tom Yasumi (animation), Sherm Cohen (supervising)	Written by : Andrew Goodman; Storyboarded by : Brian Morante (director)	September 14, 2019	1.14
258	17	"Boss for a Day"	Alan Smart (animation), Adam Paloian (supervising)	Written by : Andrew Goodman; Storyboarded by : John Trabbic (director)	July 17, 2020	0.73
258	17	"The Goofy Newbie"	Tom Yasumi (animation), Dave Cunningham (supervising)	Written by : Kaz; Storyboarded by : Kelly Armstrong (director)	September 28, 2019	1.28
259	18	"The Ghost of Plankton"	Alan Smart (animation), Adam Paloian (supervising)	Written by : Mr. Lawrence; Storyboarded by : Brian Morante (director)	October 12, 2019	1.00
259	18	"My Two Krabses"	Michelle Bryan (animation), Sherm Cohen (supervising)	Written by : Andrew Goodman; Storyboarded by : Fred Osmond (director)	January 18, 2021 (Note: This episode was first released on The Complete Twelfth Season DVD on January 12, 2021.)	0.68
260	19	"Knock Knock, Who's There?"	Tom Yasumi (animation), Dave Cunningham (supervising)	Written by : Kaz; Storyboarded by : John Trabbic (director)	April 23, 2021	0.34
260	19	"Pat Hearts Squid"	Michelle Bryan (animation), Sherm Cohen (supervising)	Written by : Mr. Lawrence; Storyboarded by : Fred Osmond (director)	July 9, 2021	0.56
261	20	"Lighthouse Louie"	Alan Smart (animation), Adam Paloian (supervising)	Written by : Luke Brookshier; Storyboarded by : John Trabbic (director)	January 18, 2021	0.68
261	20	"Hiccup Plague"	Tom Yasumi (animation), Dave Cunningham (supervising)	Written by : Luke Brookshier; Storyboarded by : Brian Morante (director)	April 22, 2022	0.44
262	21	"A Cabin in the Kelp"	Michelle Bryan (animation), Sherm Cohen (supervising)	Written by : Kaz; Storyboarded by : Kristen Morrison (director)	October 12, 2019	1.00
262	21	"The Hankering"	Alan Smart (animation), Adam Paloian (supervising)	Written by : Andrew Goodman; Storyboarded by : Fred Osmond (director)	November 30, 2019	1.10
263	22	"Who R Zoo?"	Michelle Bryan and Tom Yasumi (animation)	Written by : Mr. Lawrence; Storyboarded by : John Trabbic (director)	February 8, 2020	0.94
263	22	"Kwarantined Krab"	Tom Yasumi (animation), Dave Cunningham (supervising)	Written by : Andrew Goodman; Storyboarded by : Brian Morante (director)	April 29, 2022 (Note: The coincidental timing of the episode with the COVID-19 pandemic led Nickelodeon to delay its release in the United States, with the network later stating it would not distribute the episode, though it had already aired in some territories.)	0.40
264	23	"Plankton's Intern"	Alan Smart (animation)	Written by : Luke Brookshier; Storyboarded by : John Trabbic (director)	April 30, 2021	0.54
264	23	"Patrick's Tantrum"	Tom Yasumi (animation), Dave Cunningham (supervising)	Written by : Kaz; Storyboarded by : Fred Osmond (director)	February 25, 2022	0.42
265	24	"Bubble Bass's Tab"	Alan Smart (animation), Sherm Cohen (supervising)	Written by : Kaz; Storyboarded by : Benjamin Arcand (director)	April 9, 2021	0.48
265	24	"Kooky Cooks"	Alan Smart and Tom Yasumi (animation), Bob Camp (supervising)	Written by : Luke Brookshier; Storyboarded by : Fred Osmond (director)	April 9, 2021	0.48
266	25	"Escape from Beneath Glove World" "Escape from Glove World"	Alan Smart and Tom Yasumi (animation), Sherm Cohen and Dave Cunningham (supervising)	Written by : Mr. Lawrence; Storyboarded by : Brian Morante (director)	January 18, 2020	1.25
267	26	"Krusty Koncessionaires"	Michelle Bryan (animation), Sherm Cohen (supervising)	Written by : Andrew Goodman; Storyboarded by : Benjamin Arcand (director)	November 7, 2020	0.66
267	26	"Dream Hoppers"	Alan Smart and Tom Yasumi (animation), Dave Cunningham (supervising)	Written by : Andrew Goodman; Storyboarded by : Benjamin Arcand (director)	November 7, 2020	0.66

=== Season 13 (2020–23) ===
The thirteenth season of SpongeBob SquarePants consists of 26 episodes (52 segments), which are ordered below according to Nickelodeon's packaging order, and not their original production or broadcast order.

No. overall	No. in season	Title	Directed by	Written by	Original release date	U.S. viewers (millions)
268	1	"A Place for Pets"	Animation by : Alan Smart	Written by : Andrew Goodman; Storyboarded by : Benjamin Arcand (director)	October 22, 2020	0.85
268	1	"Lockdown for Love"	Animation by : Alan Smart	Written by : Mr. Lawrence; Storyboarded by : John Trabbic (director)	October 22, 2020	0.85
269	2	"Under the Small Top"	Animation by : Alan Smart	Written by : Ben Gruber; Storyboarded by : Mike Dougherty (director)	April 16, 2021	0.59
269	2	"Squidward's Sick Daze"	Animation by : Alan Smart	Written by : Ben Gruber; Storyboarded by : Sarah Visel (director)	April 16, 2021	0.59
270	3	"Goofy Scoopers"	Animation by : Michelle Bryan; Supervising direction by : Dave Cunningham	Written by : Andrew Goodman; Storyboarded by : Fred Osmond (director)	February 25, 2022	0.42
270	3	"Pat the Dog"	Animation by : Alan Smart	Written by : Kaz; Storyboarded by : Mike Dougherty (director)	July 9, 2021	0.56
271	4	"Something Narwhal This Way Comes"	Animation by : Alan Smart; Supervising direction by : Dave Cunningham	Written by : Mr. Lawrence; Storyboarded by : Piero Piluso (director)	November 19, 2021	0.49
271	4	"C.H.U.M.S"	Animation by : Andrew Overtoom; Supervising direction by : Sherm Cohen	Written by : Ben Gruber; Storyboarded by : Bill Reiss (director)	November 19, 2021	0.49
272	5	"SpongeBob's Road to Christmas"	Animation by : Michelle Bryan and Andrew Overtoom; Supervising direction by : Benjamin Arcand	Written by : Kaz; Storyboarded by : Benjamin Arcand (director)	December 10, 2021	0.44
273	6	"Potato Puff"	Storyboarded by : Ian Vazquez	Written by : Danny Giovannini; Storyboarded by : David Thomas (director)	April 22, 2022	0.44
273	6	"There Will Be Grease"	Animation by : Andrew Overtoom; Supervising direction by : Dave Cunningham	Written by : Andrew Goodman; Storyboarded by : Fred Osmond (director)	April 29, 2022	0.40
274	7	"The Big Bad Bubble Bass"	Animation by : Andrew Overtoom; Supervising direction by : Dave Cunningham	Written by : Andrew Goodman; Storyboarded by : Zeus Cervas (director)	May 6, 2022	0.39
274	7	"Sea-Man Sponge Haters Club"	Animation by : Michelle Bryan; Supervising direction by : Sherm Cohen	Written by : Luke Brookshier; Storyboarded by : Kenny Pittenger (director)	May 6, 2022	0.39
275	8	"Food PBFFT! Truck"	Animation by : Michelle Bryan; Supervising direction by : Sherm Cohen	Written by : Luke Brookshier; Storyboarded by : Zeus Cervas (director)	May 13, 2022	0.38
275	8	"Upturn Girls"	Storyboarded by : Ian Vazquez	Written by : Danny Giovannini; Storyboarded by : Ryan Jouas & Keegan Tsetta (directors)	May 13, 2022	0.38
276	9	"Say Awww!"	Storyboarded by : Ian Vazquez	Written by : Andrew Goodman; Storyboarded by : Dan Becker (director)	May 20, 2022	0.32
276	9	"Patrick the Mailman"	Animation by : Andrew Overtoom; Supervising direction by : Dave Cunningham	Written by : Luke Brookshier; Storyboarded by : Nick Lauer & Kurt Snyder (directors)	May 20, 2022	0.32
277	10	"Captain Pipsqueak"	Animation by : Michelle Bryan; Supervising direction by : Sherm Cohen	Written by : Richard Pursel; Storyboarded by : Zeus Cervas (director)	July 22, 2022	0.37
277	10	"Plane to Sea"	Animation by : Michelle Bryan; Supervising direction by : Sherm Cohen	Written by : Danny Giovannini; Storyboarded by : Dan Becker & Zeus Cervas (directors)	July 22, 2022	0.37
278	11	"Squidferatu"	Animation by : Andrew Overtoom; Supervising direction by : Dave Cunningham; Storyboard supervision by : Ian Vazquez	Written by : Mr. Lawrence; Storyboarded by : Dan Becker & Fred Osmond (directors)	October 14, 2022	0.23
278	11	"Slappy Daze"	Animation by : Andrew Overtoom; Supervising direction by : Dave Cunningham	Written by : Mr. Lawrence; Storyboarded by : Kenny Pittenger (director)	October 14, 2022	0.23
279	12	"Welcome to Binary Bottom"	Animation directed by : Andrew Overtoom; Supervising direction by : Dave Cunningham	Written by : Mr. Lawrence; Storyboarded by : Fred Osmond (director)	January 13, 2023	0.31
279	12	"You're Going to Pay... Phone"	Animation directed by : Michelle Bryan; Supervising direction by : Sherm Cohen	Written by : Andrew Goodman; Storyboarded by : Zeus Cervas (director)	January 13, 2023	0.31
279	12	"A Skin Wrinkle in Time"	Animation directed by : Michelle Bryan; Supervising direction by : Sherm Cohen	Written by : Andrew Goodman; Storyboarded by : Zeus Cervas (director)	January 13, 2023	0.31
280	13	"Abandon Twits"	Storyboarded by : Ian Vazquez	Written by : Luke Brookshier; Storyboarded by : Dan Becker (director)	January 20, 2023	0.32
280	13	"Wallhalla"	Animation directed by : Andrew Overtoom; Supervising direction by : Dave Cunningham	Written by : Danny Giovannini; Storyboarded by : Zeus Cervas (director)	January 20, 2023	0.32
281	14	"Salty Sponge" "The Salty Sponge"	Storyboarded by : Ian Vazquez; Animation directed by : Andrew Overtoom	Written by : Doug Lawrence; Storyboarded by : Fred Osmond (director)	January 27, 2023	0.27
281	14	"Karen for Spot"	Animation directed by : Andrew Overtoom; Supervising direction by : Dave Cunningham	Written by : Danny Giovannini; Storyboarded by : Dan Becker (director)	February 3, 2023	0.24
282	15	"Arbor Day Disarray"	Animation directed by : Michelle Bryan; Supervising direction by : Sherm Cohen	Written by : Luke Brookshier; Storyboarded by : Zeus Cervas (director)	June 27, 2023	0.11
282	15	"Ain't That the Tooth"	Storyboarded by : Ian Vazquez; Animation directed by : Michelle Bryan	Written by : Danny Giovannini; Storyboarded by : Dan Becker (director)	June 28, 2023	0.13
283	16	"Ma and Pa's Big Hurrah"	Animation directed by : Andrew Overtoom; Supervising direction by : Dave Cunningham	Written by : Kaz; Storyboarded by : Fred Osmond (director)	March 10, 2023	0.21
283	16	"Yellow Pavement"	Animation directed by : Michelle Bryan; Supervising direction by : Sherm Cohen	Written by : Danny Giovannini; Storyboarded by : Eddie Trigueros (director)	March 17, 2023	0.21
284	17	"The Flower Plot"	Storyboarded by : Ian Vazquez; Animation directed by : Alex Conaway and Jordy Judge	Written by : Doug Lawrence; Storyboarded by : Dan Becker (director)	March 24, 2023	0.30
284	17	"SpongeBob on Parade" "SpongeBob's on Parade"	Animation directed by : Andrew Overtoom; Supervising direction by : Dave Cunningham	Written by : Kaz; Storyboarded by : Zeus Cervas (director)	March 31, 2023	0.26
285	18	"Delivery to Monster Island"	Animation directed by : Michelle Bryan; Supervising direction by : Sherm Cohen	Written by : Andrew Goodman; Storyboarded by : Adam Paloian (director)	April 7, 2023	0.21
285	18	"Ride Patrick Ride"	Storyboarded by : Ian Vazquez	Written by : Luke Brookshier; Storyboarded by : Fred Osmond (director)	June 19, 2023	0.21
286	19	"Hot Crossed Nuts"	Animation directed by : Andrew Overtoom; Supervising direction by : Dave Cunningham	Written by : Danny Giovannini; Storyboarded by : Benjamin Arcand (director)	June 20, 2023	0.19
286	19	"Sir Urchin and Snail Fail"	Animation directed by : Michelle Bryan; Supervising direction by : Sherm Cohen	Written by : Doug Lawrence; Storyboarded by : Dan Becker and Fred Osmond (directors)	June 21, 2023	0.15
287	20	"Friendiversary"	Storyboarded by : Ian Vazquez	Written by : Kaz; Storyboarded by : Zeus Cervas and Fred Osmond (directors)	June 22, 2023	0.13
287	20	"Mandatory Music"	Animation directed by : Andrew Overtoom; Supervisig direction by : Dave Cunningham	Written by : Luke Brookshier; Storyboarded by : Adam Paloian (director)	June 26, 2023	0.18
288	21	"Dopey Dick"	Animation directed by : Michelle Bryan; Supervising direction by : Sherm Cohen; Storyboard supervision by : Ian Vazquez	Written by : Doug Lawrence; Storyboarded by : Benjamin Arcand (director)	June 29, 2023	0.19
288	21	"Plankton and the Beanstalk"	Animation directed by : Michelle Bryan; Supervising direction by : Sherm Cohen	Written by : Doug Lawrence; Storyboarded by : Benjamin Arcand (director)	July 17, 2023	0.21
289	22	"My Friend Patty"	Animation directed by : Andrew Overtoom; Supervising direction by : Dave Cunningham	Written by : Danny Giovannini; Storyboarded by : Dan Becker (director)	July 18, 2023	0.26
289	22	"FUN-Believable"	Animation directed by : Michelle Bryan; Supervising direction by : Sherm Cohen	Written by : Doug Lawrence; Storyboarded by : Adam Paloian (director)	July 19, 2023	0.18
290	23	"Spatula of the Heavens"	Storyboarded by : Ian Vazquez	Written by : Luke Brookshier; Storyboarded by : Benjamin Arcand (director)	July 20, 2023	0.19
290	23	"Gary's Playhouse"	Animation directed by : Andrew Overtoom; Supervising direction by : Dave Cunningham	Written by : Kaz; Storyboarded by : Zeus Cervas (director)	August 7, 2023	0.31
291	24	"Swimming Fools"	Storyboarded by : Ian Vazquez; Animation directed by : Michelle Bryan	Written by : Doug Lawrence; Storyboarded by : Adam Paloian (director)	August 8, 2023	0.24
291	24	"The Goobfather"	Animation directed by : Michelle Bryan; Supervising direction by : Sherm Cohen	Written by : Luke Brookshier; Storyboarded by : Zeus Cervas (director)	August 9, 2023	0.20
292	25	"SquidBird"	Animation directed by : Andrew Overtoom; Supervising direction by : Dave Cunningham	Written by : Danny Giovannini; Storyboarded by : Ryan Kramer (director)	August 10, 2023	0.25
292	25	"Allergy Attack!" "Allergy Attack"	Animation directed by : Michelle Bryan; Supervising direction by : Sherm Cohen	Written by : Luke Brookshier; Storyboarded by : Dan Becker (director)	October 30, 2023	0.13
293	26	"Big Top Flop"	Supervising direction by : Ian Vazquez	Written by : Kaz; Storyboarded by : Fred Osmond (director)	October 31, 2023	0.13
293	26	"Sandy, Help Us!"	Supervising direction by : Dave Cunningham; Animation directed by : Andrew Overtoom	Written by : Doug Lawrence; Storyboarded by : Zeus Cervas (director)	November 1, 2023	0.08

=== Season 14 (2023–24) ===
The fourteenth season of SpongeBob SquarePants consists of 13 episodes (21 segments), which are ordered below according to Nickelodeon's packaging order, and not their original production or broadcast order. This season was split in half with the second half moving to the fifteenth season.

No. overall	No. in season	Title	Directed by	Written by	Original release date	U.S. viewers (millions)
294	1	"Single-Celled Defense"	Animation directed by : Michelle Bryan; Supervising direction by : Sherm Cohen	Written by : Danny Giovannini; Storyboarded by : Kurt Snyder (director)	November 2, 2023	0.19
294	1	"Buff for Puff"	Animation directed by : Michelle Bryan; Supervising direction by : Ian Vazquez	Written by : Andrew Goodman; Storyboarded by : Dan Becker (director)	November 20, 2023	0.14
295	2	"We ♥ Hoops"; We Heart Hoops"	Animation directed by : Andrew Overtoom; Supervising direction by : Dave Cunningham	Written by : Kaz; Storyboarded by : Fred Osmond (director)	November 21, 2023	0.15
295	2	"SpongeChovy"	Animation directed by : Michelle Bryan; Supervising direction by : Sherm Cohen	Written by : Mr. Lawrence; Storyboarded by : Zeus Cervas (director)	November 22, 2023	0.14
296	3	"BassWard"	Supervising direction by : Ian Vazquez	Written by : Mike Bell; Storyboarded by : Kurt Snyder (director)	November 23, 2023	0.17
296	3	"Squidiot Box"	Animation directed by : Andrew Overtoom; Supervising direction by : Dave Cunningham	Written by : Luke Brookshier; Storyboarded by : Dan Becker (director)	February 12, 2024	0.20
297	4	"Blood is Thicker Than Grease"	Animation directed by : Michelle Bryan; Supervising direction by : Sherm Cohen	Written by : Luke Brookshier; Storyboarded by : Fred Osmond (director)	July 15, 2024 (Note: This episode first aired on Nicktoons on February 21, 2024.)	0.10
297	4	"Don't Make Me Laugh"	Supervising direction by : Ian Vazquez	Written by : Mr. Lawrence; Storyboarded by : Zeus Cervas (director)	February 12, 2024	0.20
298	5	"Momageddon"	Animation directed by : Andrew Overtoom; Supervising direction by : Dave Cunningham	Written by : Mike Bell; Storyboarded by : Kurt Snyder (director)	February 14, 2024	0.18
298	5	"Pet the Rock"	Animation directed by : Michelle Bryan; Supervising direction by : Sherm Cohen	Written by : Danny Giovannini; Storyboarded by : Dan Becker (director)	February 14, 2024	0.18
299	6	"Tango Tangle"	Supervising direction by : Ian Vazquez; Animation directed by : Michelle Bryan	Written by : Mr. Lawrence; Storyboarded by : Fred Osmond (director)	February 20, 2024	0.16
299	6	"Necro-Nom-Nom-Nom-I-Con"	Animation directed by : Andrew Overtoom; Supervising direction by : Dave Cunningham	Written by : Luke Brookshier; Storyboarded by : Zeus Cervas (director)	February 26, 2024	0.17
300	7	"PL-1413"	Supervising direction by : Sherm Cohen; Animation directed by : Michelle Bryan	Written by : Danny Giovannini; Storyboarded by : Brian Morante (director)	July 15, 2024	0.10
300	7	"In the Mood to Feud"	Supervising direction by : Ian Vazquez	Written by : Kaz; Storyboarded by : Kurt Snyder (director)	July 16, 2024	0.13
301	8	"Mooned!"	Supervising direction by : Dave Cunningham; Animation directed by : Andrew Overtoom	Written by : Andrew Goodman; Storyboarded by : Dan Becker (director)	July 17, 2024	0.12
301	8	"Hysterical History"	Supervising direction by : Sherm Cohen; Animation directed by : Michelle Bryan	Written by : Danny Giovannini; Storyboarded by : Zeus Cervas (director)	July 18, 2024	0.10
302	9	"Kreepaway Kamp"	Supervising direction by : Dave Cunningham, Sherm Cohen and Ian Vazquez; Animation directed by : Andrew Overtoom and Michelle Bryan	Written by : Bobby Gaylor and Mike Bell; Storyboarded by : Fred Osmond and Kurt Snyder (director)	October 10, 2024	0.16
303	10	"Kreepaway Kamp"	Supervising direction by : Dave Cunningham, Sherm Cohen and Ian Vazquez; Animation directed by : Andrew Overtoom and Michelle Bryan	Written by : Bobby Gaylor and Mike Bell; Storyboarded by : Fred Osmond and Kurt Snyder (director)	October 10, 2024	0.16
304	11	"Snow Yellow" "Snow Yellow and the Seven Jellies"	Supervising direction by : Sherm Cohen and Dave Cunningham; Animation directed by : Andrew Overtoom and Michelle Bryan	Written by : Mr. Lawrence; Storyboarded by : Dan Becker (director)	November 11, 2024 (Note: This episode was first released on Another 100 Episodes DVD on October 15, 2024.)	0.10
305	12	"The Dirty Bubble Bass"	Supervising direction by : Ian Vazquez	Written by : Luke Brookshier; Storyboarded by : Benjamin Arcand (director)	July 22, 2024	0.19
305	12	"Sheldon SquarePants"	Supervising direction by : Dave Cunningham; Animation directed by : Andrew Overtoom	Written by : Andrew Goodman; Storyboarded by : Fred Osmond (director)	July 23, 2024	0.09
306	13	"Sandy's Country Christmas"	Mark Caballero & Seamus Walsh; Supervising direction by : Ian Vazquez	Written by : Danny Giovannini; Storyboarded by : Zeus Cervas & Kurt Snyder (director)	December 2, 2024	0.04

=== Season 15 (2024–25) ===
The fifteenth season of SpongeBob SquarePants consists of 13 episodes (26 segments), which are ordered below according to Nickelodeon's packaging order, and not their original production or broadcast order. The episodes of this season were originally produced for the fourteenth season but were shifted into this season.

No. overall	No. in season	Title	Directed by	Written by	Original release date	U.S. viewers (millions)
307	1	"Sammy Suckerfish"	Supervising direction by : Dave Cunningham; Animation directed by : Andrew Overtoom	Written by : Mr. Lawrence; Storyboarded by : Dan Becker (director)	July 24, 2024	0.14
307	1	"Big League Bob"	Supervising direction by : Sherm Cohen; Animation directed by : Michelle Bryan	Written by : Kaz; Storyboarded by : Fred Osmond (director)	July 25, 2024	0.12
308	2	"UpWard"	Supervising direction by : Ian Vazquez	Written by : Andrew Goodman; Storyboarded by : Kurt Snyder (director)	December 3, 2024	0.04
308	2	"Unidentified Flailing Octopus"	Supervising direction by : Dave Cunningham; Animation directed by : Eric Bryan, Michelle Bryan and Andrew Overtoom	Written by : Mr. Lawrence; Storyboarded by : Zeus Cervas (director)	December 5, 2024	0.09
309	3	"Bad Luck Bob"	Supervising direction by : Sherm Cohen; Animation directed by : Michelle Bryan	Written by : Luke Brookshier; Storyboarded by : Dan Becker (director)	December 9, 2024	N/A
309	3	"The Sandman Cometh"	Supervising direction by : Ian Vazquez	Written by : Danny Giovannini; Storyboarded by : Brian Morante and Fred Osmond (director)	December 11, 2024	N/A
310	4	"Biscuit Ballyhoo"	Supervising direction by : Dave Cunningham; Animation directed by : Eric Bryan, Michelle Bryan and Andrew Overtoom	Written by : Andrew Goodman; Storyboarded by : Kurt Snyder (director)	December 13, 2024	N/A
310	4	"Student Driver Survivor"	Supervising direction by : Sherm Cohen; Animation directed by : Michelle Bryan	Written by : Kaz; Storyboarded by : Zeus Cervas (director)	December 17, 2024	0.07
311	5	"Wiener Takes All"	Supervising direction by : Ian Vazquez	Written by : Danny Giovannini; Storyboarded by : Dan Becker (director)	December 19, 2024	0.13
311	5	"Stuck in an Elevator"	Supervising direction by : Dave Cunningham; Animation directed by : Eric Bryan	Written by : Mr. Lawrence; Storyboarded by : Fred Osmond (director)	December 24, 2024	0.12
312	6	"Squidness Protection"	Supervising direction by : Sherm Cohen; Animation directed by : Michelle Bryan	Written by : Luke Brookshier; Storyboarded by : Kurt Snyder (director)	February 14, 2025	0.18
312	6	"Dome Alone"	Supervising direction by : Ian Vazquez; Animation directed by : Eric Bryan	Written by : Andrew Goodman; Storyboarded by : Zeus Cervas (director)	February 14, 2025	0.18
313	7	"Wary Gary"	Supervising direction by : Dave Cunningham; Animation directed by : Eric Bryan	Written by : Danny Giovannini; Storyboarded by : Dan Becker (director)	February 21, 2025	0.10
313	7	"Pinned"	Supervising direction by : Sherm Cohen; Animation directed by : Michelle Bryan	Written by : Mike Bell; Storyboarded by : Fred Osmond (director)	February 21, 2025	0.10
314	8	"Jeffy T's Prankwell Emporium"	Supervising direction by : Ian Vazquez; Animation directed by : Michelle Bryan	Written by : Danny Giovannini; Storyboarded by : Kurt Snyder (director)	February 28, 2025	0.18
314	8	"A Taste of Plankton"	Supervising direction by : Dave Cunningham; Animation directed by : Eric Bryan	Written by : Luke Brookshier; Storyboarded by : Zeus Cervas (director)	February 28, 2025	0.18
315	9	"Smartificial Intelligence"	Supervising direction by : Sherm Cohen; Animation directed by : Michelle Bryan	Written by : Andrew Goodman; Storyboarded by : Dan Becker (director)	March 7, 2025	0.07
315	9	"Firehouse Bob"	Supervising direction by : Ian Vazquez; Animation directed by : Michelle Bryan	Written by : Kaz; Storyboarded by : Fred Osmond (director)	March 7, 2025	0.07
316	10	"Pablum Plankton"	Supervising direction by : Dave Cunningham; Animation directed by : Eric Bryan	Written by : Mr. Lawrence; Storyboarded by : Kurt Snyder (director)	March 14, 2025	0.09
316	10	"MuseBob ModelPants"	Supervising direction by : Sherm Cohen; Animation directed by : Michelle Bryan	Written by : Mike Bell; Storyboarded by : Zeus Cervas (director)	March 14, 2025	0.09
317	11	"Delivery of Doom" "Delivery of DOOM!"	Supervising direction by : Ian Vazquez; Animation directed by : Michelle Bryan	Written by : Danny Giovannini; Storyboarded by : Dan Becker (director)	June 6, 2025 (Note: This episode was initially supposed to air on March 21, 2025, but was pulled. Despite this, iTunes and Amazon Prime Video would release the episode on March 22, 2025.)	0.10
317	11	"My Father the Boat"	Supervising direction by : Dave Cunningham; Animation directed by : Eric Bryan	Written by : Mr. Lawrence; Storyboarded by : Fred Osmond (director)	June 6, 2025	0.10
318	12	"Who's Afraid of Mr. Snippers?"	Supervising direction by : Sherm Cohen; Animation directed by : Michelle Bryan	Written by : Luke Brookshier; Storyboarded by : Kurt Snyder (director)	June 13, 2025	0.10
318	12	"A Fish Called Sandy"	Supervising direction by : Ian Vazquez; Animation directed by : Michelle Bryan	Written by : Mike Bell; Storyboarded by : Zeus Cervas (director)	June 13, 2025	0.10
319	13	"Making Waves"	Supervising direction by : Dave Cunningham; Animation directed by : Eric Bryan	Written by : Kaz; Storyboarded by : Dan Becker (director)	June 20, 2025	0.13
319	13	"Captain Quasar: The Next Iteration"	Supervising direction by : Sherm Cohen; Animation directed by : Michelle Bryan	Written by : Andrew Goodman; Storyboarded by : Fred Osmond (director)	June 20, 2025	0.13

=== Season 16 (2025–26) ===
The sixteenth season of SpongeBob SquarePants consists of 13 episodes (22 segments), which are ordered below according to Nickelodeon's packaging order, and not their original production or broadcast order. The episodes of this season were originally produced for the fifteenth season but were shifted into this season.

No. overall	No. in season	Title	Directed by	Written by	Original release date	U.S. viewers (millions)
320	1	"Bizarro Bottom"	Supervising direction by : Ian Vazquez; Animation directed by : Michelle Bryan	Written by : Mike Bell; Storyboarded by : Brian Morante (director)	September 12, 2025	0.19
320	1	"Squidward's Tough Break"	Supervising direction by : Dave Cunningham; Animation directed by : Eric Bryan	Written by : Danny Giovannini; Storyboarded by : Kurt Snyder (director)	September 12, 2025	0.19
321	2	"Curse of the WereDoodle"	Supervising direction by : Sherm Cohen; Animation directed by : Michelle Bryan	Written by : Luke Brookshier; Storyboarded by : Zeus Cervas (director)	September 19, 2025	0.06
321	2	"Gorilla Suit Day"	Supervising direction by : Ian Vazquez; Animation directed by : Michelle Bryan	Written by : Mr. Lawrence; Storyboarded by : Dan Becker (director)	September 19, 2025	0.06
322	3	"Exchange Student Driver"	Supervising direction by : Dave Cunningham; Animation directed by : Eric Bryan	Written by : Mike Bell; Storyboarded by : Fred Osmond (director)	September 26, 2025	0.12
322	3	"The Kreepy Krab"	Supervising direction by : Sherm Cohen; Animation directed by : Michelle Bryan	Written by : Ben Kurzrock; Storyboarded by : Kurt Snyder (director)	September 26, 2025	0.12
323	4	"SpongeBob and Patrick's Timeline Twist-Up"	Supervising direction by : Sherm Cohen, Dave Cunningham & Ian Vazquez; Animation directed by : Eric Bryan & Michelle Bryan	Written by : Luke Brookshier, Danny Giovannini, Andrew Goodman & Kaz; Storyboarded by : Dan Becker, Zeus Cervas, Fred Osmond & Kurt Snyder (directors)	June 27, 2025	0.09
324	5	"SpongeBob and Patrick's Timeline Twist-Up"	Supervising direction by : Sherm Cohen, Dave Cunningham & Ian Vazquez; Animation directed by : Eric Bryan & Michelle Bryan	Written by : Luke Brookshier, Danny Giovannini, Andrew Goodman & Kaz; Storyboarded by : Dan Becker, Zeus Cervas, Fred Osmond & Kurt Snyder (directors)	June 27, 2025	0.09
325	6	"Laundro-Madness"	Supervising direction by : Dave Cunningham; Animation directed by : Eric Bryan	Written by : Mr. Lawrence; Storyboarded by : Zeus Cervas (director)	October 10, 2025	0.12
325	6	"Hog Huntin'"	Supervising direction by : Sherm Cohen; Animation directed by : Michelle Bryan	Written by : Mike Bell; Storyboarded by : Dan Becker (director)	October 17, 2025 (Note: This episode was released on iTunes on October 11, 2025.)	0.09
326	7	"SpongeBob TrashPants"	Supervising direction by : Ian Vazquez; Animation directed by : Michelle Bryan	Written by : Kaz; Storyboarded by : Fred Osmond (director)	October 24, 2025 (Note: This episode was released on Fandango at Home on October 18, 2025.)	N/A
326	7	"Krusty Kafeteria"	Supervising direction by : Dave Cunningham; Animation directed by : Eric Bryan	Written by : Andrew Goodman; Storyboarded by : Kurt Snyder (director)	October 24, 2025	N/A
327	8	"The Haunted Bucket"	Supervising direction by : Sherm Cohen and Ian Vazquez; Animation directed by : Michelle Bryan	Written by : Danny Giovannini; Storyboarded by : Dan Becker & Zeus Cervas (directors)	October 3, 2025	0.09
327	8	"Go Fetch!"	Adam Paloian; Animation directed by : Olov Burman	Written by : Adam Paloian; Storyboarded by : Benjamin Arcand, C.H. Greenblatt & Jason Reicher	October 3, 2025	0.09
328	9	"Heart of Garbage"	Supervising direction by : Dave Cunningham; Animation directed by : Eric Bryan	Written by : Mike Bell; Storyboarded by : Fred Osmond (director)	November 7, 2025 (Note: This episode was released on FuboTV on November 1, 2025.)	0.09
328	9	"Near-Mint Plankton"	Supervising direction by : Sherm Cohen; Animation directed by : Michelle Bryan	Written by : Luke Brookshier; Storyboarded by : Kurt Snyder (director)	November 7, 2025	0.09
329	10	"Pardon My Wand"	Supervising direction by : Ian Vazquez; Animation directed by : Michelle Bryan	Written by : Mr. Lawrence; Storyboarded by : Zeus Cervas (director)	November 14, 2025	0.06
329	10	"Stupor-stition"	Supervising direction by : Dave Cunningham; Animation directed by : Eric Bryan	Written by : Kaz; Storyboarded by : Dan Becker (director)	November 14, 2025	0.06
330	11	"Pigskin Pearl"	Supervising direction by : Sherm Cohen and Ian Vazquez; Animation directed by : Michelle Bryan	Written by : Andrew Goodman; Storyboarded by : Fred Osmond & Kurt Snyder (directors)	November 28, 2025	0.07
331	12	"The Green Tentacle"	Supervising direction by : Dave Cunningham; Animation directed by : Eric Bryan	Written by : Danny Giovannini; Storyboarded by : Zeus Cervas (director)	May 15, 2026	0.13
331	12	"Happy Krabby Birthday"	Supervising direction by : Sherm Cohen; Animation directed by : Michelle Bryan	Written by : Kaz; Storyboarded by : Dan Becker (director)	May 22, 2026 (Note: This episode was initially released on Amazon Prime Video and Fandango at Home on May 16, 2026.)	0.10
332	13	"Karate Pals"	Supervising direction by : Ian Vazquez; Animation directed by : Michelle Bryan	Written by : Luke Brookshier; Storyboarded by : Fred Osmond (director)	May 29, 2026	0.15
332	13	"Karen's Klatch"	Supervising direction by : Dave Cunningham; Animation directed by : Eric Bryan	Written by : Mr. Lawrence; Storyboarded by : Kurt Synder (director)	June 5, 2026	0.17

=== Season 17 (2026) ===
The seventeenth season of SpongeBob SquarePants' episodes are ordered below according to Nickelodeon's packaging order, and not their original production or broadcast order. The episodes of this season were originally produced for the fifteenth season but were shifted into this season.

No. overall	No. in season	Title	Directed by	Written by	Original release date	U.S. viewers (millions)
333	1	"The Nerds"	Supervising direction by : Sherm Cohen; Animation directed by : Michelle Bryan	Storyboarded by : Zeus Cervas (director); Written by : Mike Bell	July 17, 2026	N/A
333	1	"The SquarePants Method"	Supervising direction by : Ian Vazquez; Animation directed by : Michelle Bryan	Storyboarded by : Dan Becker (director); Written by : Andrew Goodman	July 17, 2026	N/A
334	2	"Kiss of the Nematode"	Supervising direction by : Dave Cunningham; Animation directed by : Eric Bryan	Storyboarded by : Fred Osmond (director); Written by : Danny Giovannini	June 12, 2026	N/A
334	2	"Brainless Brawn"	Supervising direction by : Sherm Cohen; Animation directed by : Michelle Bryan	Storyboarded by : Kurt Snyder (director); Written by : Kaz	June 12, 2026	N/A
335	3	"Home Away From Home"	Supervising direction by : Ian Vazquez; Animation directed by : Michelle Bryan	Storyboarded by : Zeus Cervas (director); Written by : Mr. Lawrence	June 19, 2026	0.11
335	3	"SpongeBob SpareParts"	Supervising direction by : Dave Cunningham; Animation directed by : Eric Bryan	Storyboarded by : Dan Becker (director); Written by : Luke Brookshier	June 19, 2026	0.11
336	4	"The Lady in the Lighthouse"	Supervising direction by : Sherm Cohen; Animation directed by : Michelle Bryan	Storyboarded by : Fred Osmond (director); Written by : Andrew Goodman	June 26, 2026	N/A
336	4	"Bitter Groans and Gardens"	Supervising direction by : Ian Vazquez	Storyboarded by : Brian Morante (director); Written by : Mike Bell	June 26, 2026	N/A
337	5	"The Fry Cook and the Elves"	Supervising direction by : Dave Cunningham; Animation directed by : Eric Bryan	Storyboarded by : Zeus Cervas (director); Written by : Kaz	July 24, 2026	N/A
337	5	"It's About Mime"	Supervising direction by : Sherm Cohen; Animation directed by : Michelle Bryan	Storyboarded by : Dan Becker (director); Written by : Danny Giovannini	July 24, 2026	N/A
338	6	"Plankton's Squeeze Play"	Supervising direction by : Ian Vazquez	Storyboarded by : Fred Osmond (director); Written by : Luke Brookshier	July 10, 2026	N/A
338	6	"How the West Was Dumb"	Supervising direction by : Dave Cunningham; Animation directed by : Eric Bryan	Storyboarded by : Kurt Snyder (director); Written by : Andrew Goodman	July 10, 2026	N/A
339	7	"My Tighty Whiteys"	Supervising direction by : Sherm Cohen; Animation directed by : Eric Bryan	Storyboarded by : Zeus Cervas (director); Written by : Mr. Lawrence	July 31, 2026	N/A
339	7	"What Ever Happened to Baby Prunes?"	Supervising direction by : Ian Vazquez	Storyboarded by : Dan Becker (director); Written by : Kaylee Huffman	July 31, 2026	N/A
340	8	"Night School Knuckleheads"	Supervising direction by : Dave Cunningham; Animation directed by : Eric Bryan	Storyboarded by : Fred Osmond (director); Written by : Kaz	August 7, 2026	N/A
340	8	"Painfully Employed"	Supervising direction by : Sherm Cohen; Animation directed by : Michelle Bryan	Storyboarded by : Kurt Snyder (director); Written by : Danny Giovannini	August 7, 2026	N/A
341	9	"Duct Tape Dystopia"	Supervising direction by : Ian Vazquez	Storyboarded by : Zeus Cervas (director); Written by : Luke Brookshier	August 21, 2026	N/A
341	9	"Farmer's Market Feud"	Supervising direction by : Dave Cunningham; Animation directed by : Eric Bryan	Storyboarded by : Dan Becker (director); Written by : Andrew Goodman	August 21, 2026	N/A
342	10	"Rock Bottom Games"	Supervising direction by : Ian Vazquez	Storyboarded by : Kurt Snyder (director); Written by : Mr. Lawrence	August 28, 2026	N/A
342	10	"Clicking with a Clique"	Supervising direction by : Sherm Cohen; Animation directed by : Michelle Bryan	Storyboarded by : Fred Osmond (director); Written by : Kaz	August 28, 2026	N/A
TBA	TBA	"Backyard Bickering"	Supervising direction by : Dave Cunningham; Animation directed by : Eric Bryan	Storyboarded by : Zeus Cervas (director); Written by : Danny Giovannini	November 6, 2026 (Note: This episode aired early on Nicktoons on October 30, 2026.)	TBD
TBA	TBA	"A Hair Grows on Patrick"	Supervising direction by : Sherm Cohen; Animation directed by : Michelle Bryan	Storyboarded by : Dan Becker (director); Written by : Kaz	November 6, 2026	TBD
TBA	TBA	"Yoga Yahoos"	Supervising direction by : Ian Vazquez	Storyboarded by : Fred Osmond (director); Written by : Luke Brookshier	November 13, 2026	TBD
TBA	TBA	"Sounds Like Trouble"	Supervising direction by : Dave Cunningham; Animation directed by : Eric Bryan	Storyboarded by : Piero Piluso (director); Written by : Andrew Goodman	November 13, 2026	TBD
TBA	TBA	"Upturn's Brunch"	N/A	N/A	November 20, 2026	TBD
TBA	TBA	"Free with Every Meal"	N/A	N/A	November 20, 2026	TBD
TBA	TBA	"Merry Christmas, Mr. Plankton"	TBA	TBA	November 27, 2026	TBD

== See also ==
- List of SpongeBob SquarePants episodes (seasons 1–10)
- List of SpongeBob SquarePants films
