= John Jannarone =

American journalist

John Jannarone is an Italian-American businessman who is founder of Capital Markets Media LLC, the sole owner of IPO Edge and CorpGov. He was previously senior writer at CNBC, which he joined in 2014. Previously, he was a corporate media and entertainment writer at The Wall Street Journal. In 2008, Jannarone joined The WSJ's financial analysis section "Heard on the Street" as a Singapore-based reporter. Prior to that Jannarone worked as a deputy bureau chief at Dow Jones, as an analyst at The Hartnett Group in Dallas and an investment banker at Morgan Stanley in New York City.

Jannarone is most well known for breaking the story about The WSJ's corporate parent News Corp. splitting into two divisions: Entertainment and Publishing.

He was first to break news of the Archegos scandal, when Bill Hwang over-levered a hedge fund that ultimately collapsed, sending ripples through the financial markets. The scoop was matched by CNBC's Scott Wapner, Bloomberg and several other major outlets. The Wall Street Journal described the scandal as one "that led to the biggest single-firm meltdown since the financial crisis" when Hwang was sentenced to 18 years in prison in November 2024.

Jannarone is well known for his work which "expos[ed] accounting irregularities at Diamond Foods. The irregularities caused a 70% fall in the company's stock price and a collapse of the planned $2.4 billion takeover of Pringles and resignation of the CEO.

== Personal ==
Born in 1980, Jannarone currently resides in Manhattan, New York. He obtained his degree in economics from Princeton University where he graduated cum laude.
