= Bubble Bowl =

Bubble Bowl refers to multiple entities in the SpongeBob SquarePants franchise:

- An ability unlocked after the first major boss battle in the 2003 video game SpongeBob SquarePants: Battle for Bikini Bottom and its 2020 remake
- A parody of an American football halftime show in the season 2 episode "Band Geeks"
