= You Wish =

You Wish may refer to:

- You Wish! (film), a Disney Channel Original Movie
- "You Wish!" (song), a song by Lalaine from the film's soundtrack
- "You Wish", a song by Vixen from the album Live & Learn
- You Wish (TV series), an American sitcom
- "Shanghaied" An episode of the animated series SpongeBob SquarePants, originally aired as "You Wish"
