= Christmas Who? =

- SpongeBob SquarePants episode
- Title card
- Episode no.: Season 2 Episode 8
- Directed by: Walt Dohrn; Paul Tibbitt; Chris Headrick (storyboard); Erik Wiese (storyboard); Tom Yasumi (animation); Alan Smart (supervising)
- Written by: Walt Dohrn; Paul Tibbitt; Mr. Lawrence
- Narrated by: Tom Kenny
- Production code: 5571-155
- Original air date: December 7, 2000
- Running time: 22 minutes

Guest appearance
- Mike Bell as Santa Claus

Episode chronology
← Previous "Life of Crime"	Next → "Survival of the Idiots"
- SpongeBob SquarePants (season 2)

"Christmas Who?" (also known as "Patchy The Pirate Presents The SpongeBob Christmas Special") is the eighth episode of season two of SpongeBob SquarePants and the 28th episode overall, which serves as the first double-length episode of the series. The episode aired on Nickelodeon in the United States on December 7, 2000. The episode marks the first appearance of both Patchy the Pirate and his pet parrot, Potty in the main show. The episode follows SpongeBob as he learns what Christmas is about, and as he creates excitement for everyone in Bikini Bottom.

== Plot ==
In Encino, California, the French Narrator introduces the president of the SpongeBob SquarePants fan club, Patchy the Pirate, along with his "pet", in actuality a marionette, Potty the Parrot. Patchy receives a fan letter, asking if SpongeBob likes Christmas as much as he does. Patchy explains that the people of Bikini Bottom did not always celebrate Christmas, and decides to show how they were introduced to it.

While heading to Sandy's treedome for a surprise visit, SpongeBob SquarePants is horrified to see her electrifying the tree with Christmas lights, perceiving it as a house-fire. Sandy informs SpongeBob that she is preparing for the holiday season, and explains customary Christmas traditions to him. SpongeBob becomes excited about a visit from Santa Claus, and spreads the news to the rest of Bikini Bottom. However, Squidward refuses to participate in the celebrations, claiming that Santa does not exist. The citizens of Bikini Bottom enthusiastically prepare for the upcoming holiday, but their faith is shattered after Santa fails to arrive on Christmas Eve (Most likely because they waited all night for Santa to come). Upset with SpongeBob, they leave him behind and go home in disappointment, now believing that Santa doesn't exist.

Squidward relishes that Santa did not come and taunts a despondent SpongeBob over it, the latter now thinking that Squidward was right all along. However, after being presented with a homemade gift from SpongeBob, Squidward feels guilty for hurting his feelings and tries to compensate for his rudeness by masquerading as Santa Claus to SpongeBob; however, he later winds up distributing all his possessions to the residents of Bikini Bottom as Christmas gifts. SpongeBob visits Squidward to express his excitement about Santa's visit, but Squidward makes him turn around and leave, all while still shouting in joy. Squidward encounters a note from Santa Claus, graciously thanking him, and sees his sleigh soaring overhead. Dismissing Santa as a sign of his insanity, Squidward goes inside his house to play his clarinet.

After the SpongeBob episode ends, Potty gives Patchy a little present. Patchy then steps under a mistletoe, hoping to be kissed by a woman, only for Potty to start chasing after him with the intention of kissing him. Seeing that Patchy is busy at the moment, the French Narrator wishes the audience a happy holiday season.

== Release ==
=== Broadcast ===
"Christmas Who?" first aired on Nickelodeon on December 7, 2000 with a TV-Y7 parental rating. The episode got on premiere 2.1 million viewers. The episode was meant to air a day eariler to make space for a rerun of a different episode. On December 6, 2012, almost 12 years after "Christmas Who?", another SpongeBob Christmas episode was released on Nickelodeon called "It's a SpongeBob Christmas!". A third SpongeBob Christmas-themed episode, "SpongeBob's Road to Christmas", first aired on Nickelodeon on December 10, 2021.

=== Home media ===
"Christmas Who?" was released on the DVD compilation called Christmas on September 30, 2003. The episode was also included in SpongeBob SquarePants: The Complete 2nd Season DVD released on October 19, 2004. On September 22, 2009, "Christmas Who?" was released on the SpongeBob SquarePants: The First 100 Episodes DVD, alongside all the episodes of seasons one through five.

== Reception ==
The special received positive reviews; Priya Elan of Guardian for the 10th anniversary of SpongeBob SquarePants, put "Christmas Who?" at 4th for the 5 best SpongeBob SquarePants episodes. @Steve on Reviewstream.com calls it "a great story of the holiday spirit". In the DVD released by Nickelodeon, the episode was ranked at number 10 as one of SpongeBob SquarePants's 10 Happiest Moments.
