= Go Skateboarding Day =

Annual holiday organized by the IASC

Go Skateboarding Day Logo

Go Skateboarding Day (GSD), observed on the 21st of June, is an event created by Don Brown, formerly IASC Marketing Director and co-created with Per Welinder who wanted a day for the global skate community to all ride together and elevate the energy of skateboarding around the world. International Association of Skateboard Companies (IASC).

== History ==
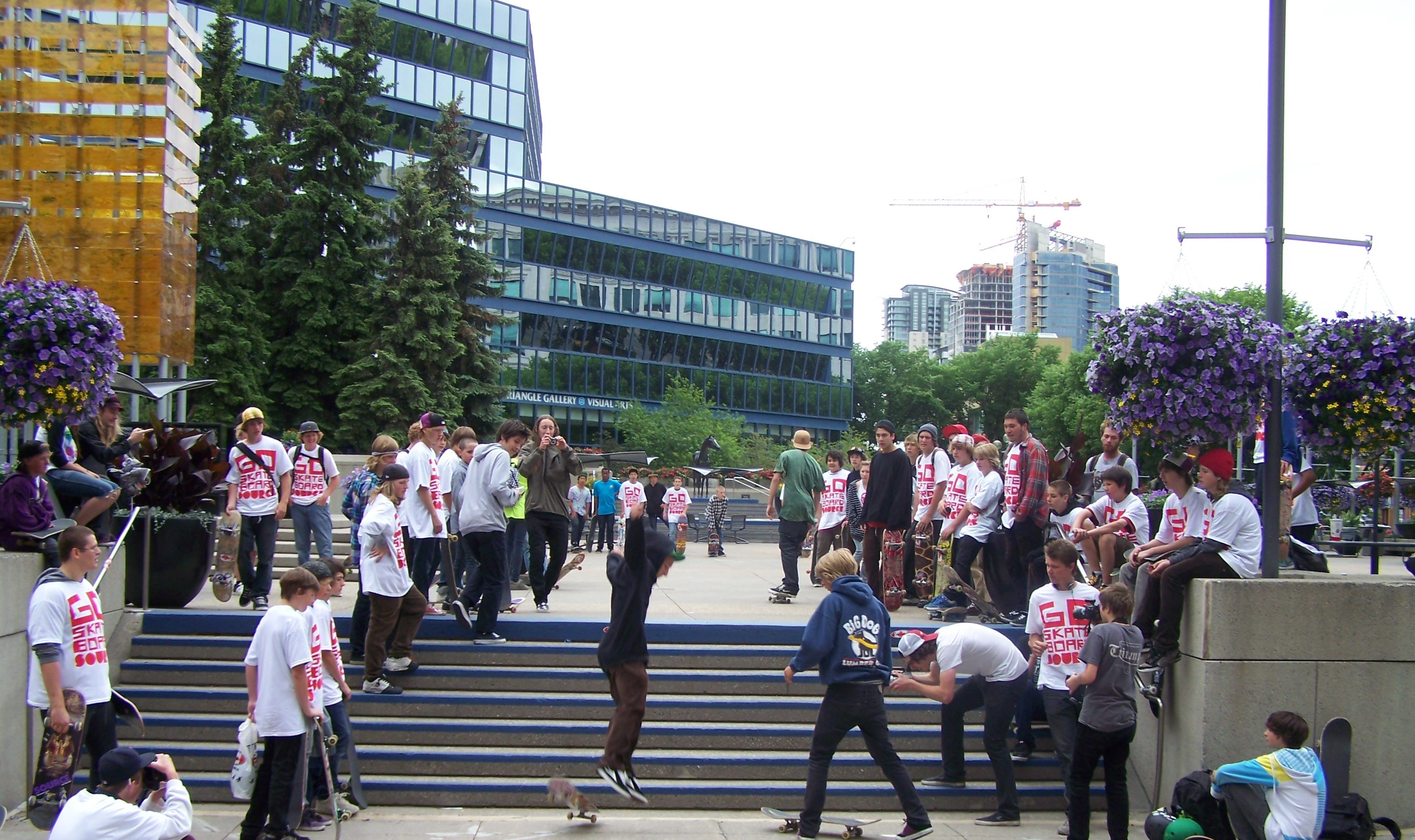
Go Skateboarding Day 2009 in Calgary, Alberta

Go Skateboarding Day was created in 2003 by the International Association of Skateboard Companies (IASC) to help make skateboarding more accessible through events held in major cities around the world.

The first events happened in 2004 where the skate industry got their local communities together to skate BBQ and have fun. Etnies, éS, Emerica, Vans, Birdhouse, and many others all gathered at the etnies skate park in Lake Forest, CA. Tony Hawk, Ryan Sheckler, Heath Kirchart are a few of the top pros that turned up that day to skate together.

In 2004 Emerica footwear set the stage for the first ever “Wild in the Streets” event in Philadelphia, PA where thousands of skateboarders took to the streets.

Emerica continued each year to bring together the largest crowds. In Brazil there was an estimate of 25,000 skateboarders charging through the streets and this energy grew each year.

In 2006, more than 350 events took place in 32 countries.

The following year, the IASC received Special Congressional Recognition from US Congresswoman Loretta Sanchez for its work in promoting skateboarding and encouraging young people to get outside and practice the sport.

== Celebrations and events in 2014 ==
Hundreds of people skated in Albany, New York.

In the west country of the UK, Erik Ellington, Spencer Hamilton, Dee Ostrander and Lizard King joined Bristol locals such as Korahn Gayle, Josh Arnott, Paul Carter, and Dave Snaddon to celebrate Go Skateboarding Day in 2014.

Thousands of skaters were present at Hollenbeck Skate Plaza, Louisiana.

North Florida's Hemming Plaza hosts an annual Go Skate Day celebration.

Nike sponsored a large Go Skateboarding Day event in Cologne, Germany.

The charity organisation Skatistan has been celebrating Go Skateboarding Day in Afghanistan since 2009. In 2014, their events also spread to Cambodia and South Africa. More than 150 students and their families and friends joined street parades in Kabul and over 200 attended celebrations in Mazar-e-Sharif.

Vans holds an annual celebration of Go Skate Day in Singapore. In 2014, hundreds of skaters went to Sommerset Skate Park for the event.

Hundreds of skateboarders joined in to celebrate Go Skateboarding Day in Lima, Peru.

== 2007 YouTube arrest incident ==
Some skaters celebrating Go Skateboarding Day have had conflicts with the law. One of the more notable incidents involved skaters Matt McCormack, Skylar Nalls, Robbie Brindley, Casey Canterbury and several other friends in Hot Springs, Arkansas, where they were involved in an incident with police. Baird and the involved skaters contend that the police used excessive force when they arrested them; the police maintain that the officer was enforcing a city ordinance. The incident made headlines when a YouTube video of the arrest was uploaded, being viewed three million times, followed by intense internet debate over the incident.

== See also ==
- International Surfing Day
