= Surfing Magazine =

Print magazine covering surfing

- Categories: Sports magazine
- Frequency: Monthly
- Total circulation: 89,097 (December 2011)
- First issue: December 1964
- Final issue: January 2017
- Company: Motor Trend Group
- Country: USA
- Based in: San Clemente, California
- Language: English
- Website: www.surfingthemag.com
- ISSN: 0194-9314

Surfing Magazine, originally titled International Surfing Magazine, was a magazine that was founded in 1964 by Orange County, California, local Dick Graham and surf photographer LeRoy Grannis. Later the magazine was acquired by Adrian B. Lopez, a New York magazine publisher who relocated the magazine to the east coast. Eventually the title became Surfing Magazine and moved to Southern California.

In 1980, Australian millionaire Clyde Packer bought the magazine after leaving his native Australia and settling in Laguna Beach and, ultimately, Santa Barbara. The magazine moved its offices to San Clemente where it was published for more than 15 years before being purchased by Primedia (now Rent Group), and later purchased by supermarket magnate Ron Burkle's Source Interlink. Always in competition with nearby Surfer Magazine, ultimately both magazines came under the ownership of Source Interlink.

In November 1995, the magazine's Senior Editor Skip Snead worked with Santa Cruz aerial innovator Shawn "Barney" Barron to develop the Surfing Magazine "Airshow", an aerial surfing competition.

Surfing Magazine was the official magazine for the Vans Triple Crown of Surfing and the National Scholastic Surfing Association. Many popular features include Annual Green Issue and Annual Swimsuit Issue, Shaper of the Year, and International Surfing Day.

In January 2017, the magazine's owners announced that Surfing Magazine would cease its print edition and its digital assets would be folded into fellow TEN title and longtime competitor Surfer. The last issue of the magazine appeared in January 2017.
