= Corky Carroll's Surf School =

Surf school in Huntington Beach, California

- Industry: Surfing
- Founded: 1996; 30 years ago
- Founder: Rick Walker; Corky Carroll
- Headquarters: Huntington Beach, California
- Services: Surf Lessons; Surf Camps; Equipment Rentals
- Website: https://www.surfschool.net/

Corky Carroll's Surf School is a surf school based in Huntington Beach, California. It provides surfing lessons, surfboard rentals, surf camps, and programs to help people learn to surf. The business operates out of Bolsa Chica State Beach.

Corky Carroll's Surf School is one of the longest-running surf schools in California, and has been recognized as one of the top surf schools in America. The school is named for professional surfer Corky Carroll, who helped start the business and was its first surf instructor.

== History ==
Corky Carroll’s Surf School was founded in June 1996 in Huntington Beach, California, by Rick Walker, in partnership with professional surfer Corky Carroll. At the time, formal surf schools were uncommon in Orange County. Walker, a television producer based in Huntington Beach, approached Carroll with the idea after the two had met through Walker’s local sports television program Life in Sports. The school opened on June 15, 1996, operating on a stretch of shoreline near Lifeguard Tower 18 in Bolsa Chica State Beach.

In its early years, Walker managed the school's business operations, while Carroll focused on instruction and curriculum development. Carroll developed structured teaching methods that formed the basis of the school’s instructional approach and remained involved in training instructors and teaching lessons. Around that time, Walker and Carroll also collaborated to produce an instructional video called Corky Carroll's Learn to Surf the Safe, Fast and Easy Way.

In 1998, the operation expanded internationally with the opening of a seasonal surf camp based out of Nosara, Costa Rica in Playa Guiones. The Costa Rica location eventually developed into a year-round surf resort offering instruction alongside lodging and meals.

By the early 2000s, Corky Carroll’s Surf School was operating continuously in both California and Costa Rica. Walker later retired from daily operations, and the school was taken over by his children. The school has since remained under family ownership, with Rick's son Collin Walker, and his wife Yaya, overseeing the Nosara location, and Rick's daughter Kelsey Coleman, and her husband Keith, operating the business in Huntington Beach.

== Mission and programs ==
Corky Carroll’s Surf School provides surf instruction for beginners and intermediate surfers. Their philosophy revolves around the idea that everyone can surf and be empowered to do so in a fun and encouraging environment. In their lessons and programs they seek to create an accessible entry point to surfing that emphasizes fundamental ocean safety and progressive skill development.

=== Community outreach ===
Corky Carroll’s Surf School has been involved in adaptive and charitable surfing programs in Huntington Beach. Since 2018, they have hosted the “SAC Surf-O-Rama” in partnership with Edison High School to teach surfing to students with disabilities. Since 2025, they have partnered with Miracles for Kids to provide beach events for critically ill children.

The school also participates in public outreach related to surfing through events such as International Surfing Day, California Surfing Day, and beginner meetups open to the public, as well as hosts regular community beach cleanups at Bolsa Chica State Beach.

== Media recognition ==
Corky Carroll's Surf School has been featured by surf-industry and international media. In 2025 Surfer magazine named Corky Carroll’s Surf School one of the “Top 12 Surf Schools in America.” Surfline cited it as one of the “best surf schools in California.” The school has also been featured in major media outlets, including National Geographic, The Wall Street Journal, Los Angeles Times, SF Gate, Hello! and Outside magazine.

In 2023, the school was included as a Monopoly square in Monopoly: Huntington Beach Edition.

== See also ==
- Corky Carroll
