= Shanghaied (SpongeBob SquarePants) =

- SpongeBob SquarePants episode
- Title card
- Episode no.: Season 2 Episode 13a
- Directed by: Aaron Springer (storyboard director); C.H. Greenblatt and Zeus Cervas (storyboard artists); Peter Bennett and Andy "Spike" Clark (backgrounds colors); Frank Weiss (animation); Alan Smart (supervising); Derek Drymon (creative)
- Written by: Aaron Springer; C. H. Greenblatt; Merriwether Williams
- Production code: 5571-165
- Original air date: March 9, 2001
- Running time: 22 minutes

Guest appearance
- Brian Doyle-Murray as The Flying Dutchman

Episode chronology
← Previous "The Smoking Peanut"	Next → "Gary Takes a Bath"
- SpongeBob SquarePants (season 2)

"Shanghaied", also known as "You Wish", is an episode of the American animated television series SpongeBob SquarePants. It is the first part of the 13th episode of the second season, and the first half of the 33rd episode overall. It was directed by Aaron Springer and written by Springer, C. H. Greenblatt, and Merriwether Williams, with the animation directed by Frank Weiss. Greenblatt also served as the storyboard artist.

The series follows the adventures and endeavors of the title character and his various friends in the underwater city of Bikini Bottom. In this episode, SpongeBob (voiced by Tom Kenny), Patrick Star (Bill Fagerbakke), and Squidward Tentacles (Rodger Bumpass) encounter the Flying Dutchman (Brian Doyle-Murray), a ghostly pirate who seeks to acquire a new eternal crew to scare the residents of Bikini Bottom. As SpongeBob and Patrick do a poor job as his crew, the pirate considers devouring them instead, leading the two to try to figure out how to thwart his plan.

"Shanghaied" originally aired as a television special on Nickelodeon in the United States on March 9, 2001, and featured a poll where viewers can vote on the outcome of the episode; subsequent broadcasts have since shown a revised version which removed references to this voting feature. The episode received critical acclaim from online pop culture critics for its extensive and hilarious gags and is generally ranked highly among their lists for the best SpongeBob SquarePants episodes. The original broadcast version was released on "The First 100 Episodes" DVD of the series in 2009 while the revised version was released on "The Complete Second Season" DVD set in 2004.

== Plot ==
In Encino, California, SpongeBob SquarePants fan Patchy the Pirate (Tom Kenny) presents his favorite episode "Shanghaied" to audiences.

SpongeBob is shocked to find that an anchor has suddenly dropped onto his house and alerts his next-door neighbor, Squidward. After his house is damaged by the anchor, Squidward begins climbing the anchor rope to see where it came from; SpongeBob and Patrick follow him. The three come across a ghost ship, which they board. The Flying Dutchman appears and explains that anyone who sets foot on his ship will be forced to serve as his "ghostly" crew for eternity. Due to Squidward's complaining, the pirate opens a zipper-like portal and throws him into the "Fly of Despair", a void filled with horrific imagery, intimidating SpongeBob and Patrick into becoming crew members.

The Dutchman takes SpongeBob and Patrick on a Bikini Bottom haunting spree, but they fail to frighten citizens. Afterwards, he tells them that he will instead eat them. The two escape their holding cell through a live-action perfume department; after surviving the smells, they overhear the Dutchman mentioning in his diary that he cannot eat without his "dining sock", which they steal. The Flying Dutchman proposes that if they give back the sock, he will give them three wishes. They accept, and Patrick wastes the first wish on receiving this knowledge one minute earlier. SpongeBob wastes the second wish on wishing for Squidward to join them, returning him to the ship.

SpongeBob, Patrick, and Squidward argue over who should get the last wish. The Flying Dutchman intervenes and decides to give the last wish to SpongeBob. SpongeBob wishes that the Dutchman were a vegetarian, assuring that he will not eat them. The three are then seemingly transported back to SpongeBob's pineapple home but quickly realize that they have been turned into fruits and are trapped in a blender, as the Dutchman wants to make them into a fruit smoothie. They attempt to escape and are pursued by the Dutchman around his ship, now a hippie-esque van with a sail floating against a psychedelic background.

After the episode proper, Patchy tries to read fan mail, only to be blown up with his parrot Potty (Stephen Hillenburg), who lit a fuse on himself, not knowing it was no longer planned for the program.

=== Alternate endings ===
The episode has five alternate endings, the first two originally aired as part of the original "You Wish" format that viewers could vote on and included on select DVD releases, while the other three were produced in 2024 as part of the series' 14th production season and were later released in 2026.

In Patrick's first ending, he wishes for chewing gum, arguing that "if we're going to be trapped here forever, we might as well have fresh breath."

In Squidward's first ending, he wishes he had never met SpongeBob or Patrick, causing them to lose their memory of him but not returning them home; SpongeBob and Patrick proceed to introduce themselves to Squidward, accomplishing nothing.

In SpongeBob's second ending, he wishes that the Dutchman was too full to eat them. This backfires as the Dutchman is still thirsty, and turns the three into drinks and winds up drinking them, remarking that they were more refreshing the second time.

In Patrick's second ending, he wishes for another wish and begins continually wishing for another wish, angering Squidward and resulting in the three getting eaten.

In Squidward's second ending, he tries to accurately wish himself back home and guarantee that SpongeBob and Patrick can never wish him back to the Dutchman's ship. Returning home, he believes that the wish was a success until seeing SpongeBob and Patrick outside his house, revealing that the Dutchman ate the plot of land holding their houses, with them on it.

In all endings, the Flying Dutchman is last seen sleeping happily after eating the trio, who can still be heard from inside him.

== Production ==
"Shanghaied" was written by Aaron Springer, C. H. Greenblatt, and Merriwether Williams. Aaron Springer also was the storyboard director, with also C. H. Greenblatt being a storyboard artist. Zeus Cervas was the other storyboard artist. The animation was directed by Frank Weiss, with the creative director being Derek Drymon. The episode's supervising director was The background colors were done by Peter Bennett and Andy "Spike" Clark.

== Release ==
"Shanghaied" originally aired on Nickelodeon in the United States as a television special titled "You Wish" on March 9, 2001. In the special, viewers who tuned in could vote by telephone or online for who gets the wish at the end of the episode. After SpongeBob received the most votes, the original episode proper had SpongeBob get the wish, and Patchy then featured what would have happened if viewers voted for either Squidward or Patrick.

For every subsequent broadcast of the episode, SpongeBob is the official character selected to get the wish, while the segments featuring Patchy the Pirate are trimmed down to remove any reference to the original polling feature of the episode. The original broadcast version of the episode was released on the 14-disc DVD collection titled "The First 100 Episodes" on September 22, 2009, with the telephone number displayed for voting being censored, while the revised version was released on "SpongeBob SquarePants: The Complete Second Season" DVD collection on October 19, 2004; the latter release includes a commentary track for the episode from director Aaron Springer, animation director Frank Weiss, and writer C.H. Greenblatt. The revised version would also be featured in the UK edition of the "SpongeBob Squarepants: Ghoul Fools" DVD release on October 8, 2012, with dubbing in French, German, Italian, and Dutch. Another version without the Patchy segments was released on the "Sea Stories" DVD on November 5, 2002, as a bonus feature where viewers can play the episode with the ending of their choice.

A five-minute edit of the episode was released on YouTube by the official SpongeBob SquarePants YouTube account.

== Reception ==
"Shanghaied" received critical acclaim from online pop culture critics. Lizzie Manno of Paste ranked "Shanghaied" at No. 3 in her top ten list of SpongeBob SquarePants episodes, commending the episode's abundance of jokes and stating that it "might be the most underrated episode of SpongeBob due to its high laugh ratio." Jaclyn Kessel of Decider ranked "Shanghaied" at No. 1 in her "10 Essential 'SpongeBob SquarePants' Episodes" list, writing that "[t]he terrific writing, creativity, and absolute goofiness of 'Shanghaied' makes it the best episode ever." In 2024, Andrew Firriolo of BuzzFeed ranked the episode as the 24th best SpongeBob episode out of 25, claiming the episode is "underrated".

Guillermo Kurten, Fawzia Khan, and Robbie Robinson of CBR ranked it the 12th out of 20 most disturbing SpongeBob episode, saying it's a good example of a kids' episode with a "creepy" premise. Oliver Whitney of TV Guide ranked "Shanghaied" at No. 6 in his "100 Best SpongeBob SquarePants Episodes" list, while Aaron Kirby of WhatCulture ranked it at No. 10 in his top ten list, saying it's a "frequently" hilarious episode, with surprising twists. Tyler B. Searle of Collider ranked it 2nd most rewatchable SpongeBob episode, claiming the episode is "phenomenal" with the "high-quailty surreal" jokes in it.

== Leaked audio ==
On June 26, 2024, the raw audio track from the line reads of the episode (dated June 30, 2000) were leaked on YouTube and the Internet Archive. Notable details from this audio include Patrick yodeling "leedle leedle" being ad libbed, and Tom Kenny is heard swearing as SpongeBob. These uploads would soon be removed by Paramount Skydance, although reuploads can be found.
