= International Surfing Day =

Unofficial holiday celebrating surfing

International Surfing Day, held annually on the third Saturday of June, is an unofficial, environmentally conscious sports-centered holiday that celebrates the sport of surfing, surfing lifestyle, and the sustainability of ocean resources. Another purpose of the celebration is to promote the popularity of surfing and to attract new participants.

== History ==
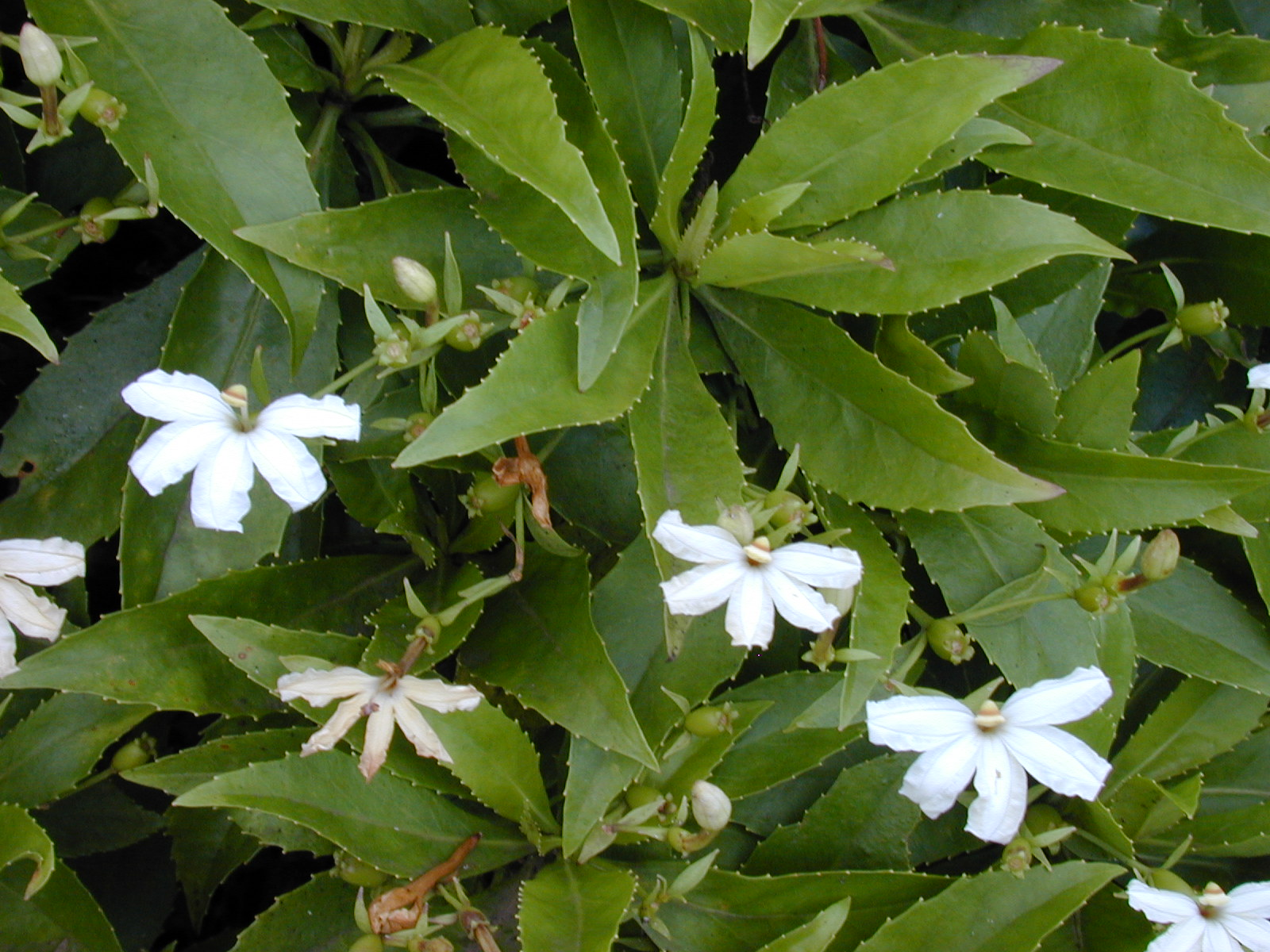
A Naupaka plant

International Surfing Day was established in 2005 by Surfing Magazine and The Surfrider Foundation. The day closely follows the spirit and intent of the World Surf Day, established by the Usenet newsgroup alt.surfing in 1993. International Surfing Day is a worldwide celebration of the sport of surfing. The day is observed with surf contests, barbecues, film screenings and other surf-related activities. Surfers also use the day to give back to the environment by organizing beach clean-ups, dune and other habitat restoration and other activities such as lobbying to maintain the recreation areas in California where surfing occurs, or planting Naupaka (a flowering coastal plant) in Hawaii.

Direct action was used by form of protest on this day in England to express opposition to sewage in the waters of the Gold Coast; a precarious problem for many surfers who become infected by the bacteria from open wounds from sports-related injuries.

=== Extent of celebrations ===
International Surf Day events have been held all around the world. Global chapters of The Surfrider Foundation celebrate in various ways each year, ranging from organized beach cleanups to ceremonial paddle outs. Corky Carroll's Surf School in Huntington Beach, California holds an annual event focused on raising awareness amongst beginner surfers.

== See also ==
- Earth Day
- Go Skateboarding Day
