= Graveyard Shift (SpongeBob SquarePants) =

- SpongeBob SquarePants episode
- Title card
- Episode no.: Season 2 Episode 16a
- Directed by: Stephen Hillenburg; Derek Drymon; Storyboard: Jay Lender; Dan Povenmire; Animation: Sean Dempsey
- Written by: Mr. Lawrence; Jay Lender; Dan Povenmire
- Production code: 5571-176
- Original air date: September 6, 2002 (Note: The episode was first released in Nautical Nonsense VHS and Nautical Nonsense & Sponge Buddies DVD on March 12, 2002.)

Episode chronology
← Previous "Band Geeks"	Next → "Krusty Love"
- SpongeBob SquarePants (season 2)

"Graveyard Shift" is the first part of the 16th episode of the second season, and the 36th overall episode of the American animated television series SpongeBob SquarePants. The episode was written by Mr. Lawrence, Jay Lender and Dan Povenmire, and the animation was directed by Sean Dempsey. Lender and Povenmire also served as storyboard directors. The episode was copyrighted in 2001 and aired on Nickelodeon in the United States on September 6, 2002.

In the episode, Squidward and SpongeBob are forced to work 24 hours a day by their boss Mr. Krabs. Squidward soon becomes bored, and tells SpongeBob a ghost story to scare him off the night shift. When SpongeBob begins to panic, Squidward tells him that the story is fictional. However, later that night, the events of the story begin to occur.

The episode featured stock footage of Max Schreck as Count Orlok from the 1922 silent film Nosferatu, who appears at the end of the episode as a gag. The episode received critical acclaim upon release.

== Plot ==
On a Tuesday night, Squidward eagerly prepares to leave work at the Krusty Krab as it closes; when he refuses to take a last-minute order from a customer, Mr. Krabs overhears the conversation and is inspired to create a night shift. The restaurant remains open, leaving SpongeBob and Squidward to work 24 hours a day.

Exasperated with his boss' demands and annoyed with SpongeBob, Squidward tries to scare him into being afraid of the night shift. He tells the story of the "Hash-Slinging Slasher", a clumsy former Krusty Krab fry cook who used a spatula as a prosthetic hand after accidentally slicing off his real hand and was killed by a passing bus. The story claims that the Hash-Slinging Slasher was fired at his funeral, and his ghost returns to the Krusty Krab every Tuesday night to get revenge for being fired. Squidward says that the Slasher's arrival will be indicated by three warnings: the lights flickering on and off, the phone ringing with no caller on the other end, and a ghostly bus arriving to drop him off before he "gets" his victims. SpongeBob reacts with intense fear; at first amused, Squidward soon becomes irritated and admits that he invented the story.

Later that night at 3:00 AM Wednesday morning, when the restaurant is empty, the lights begin flickering and the phone rings with no answer on the other end, but SpongeBob and Squidward assume they are being pranked by each other. A late bus arrives at the Krusty Krab and drops off a silhouette matching the description of the Hash-Slinging Slasher. SpongeBob and Squidward are terrified, but the figure turns out to be a fish applying for a job, stating that he had tried calling the Krusty Krab by telephone earlier, but hung up out of nervousness. The three discover that the flickering lights were caused by "Nosferatu" — whom the characters are inexplicably familiar with — playing with the light switch.

== Production ==
Original sketch of a deleted scene by Jay Lender and Dan Povenmire, in which SpongeBob is delivering mail to Floorboard Harry.

"Graveyard Shift" was written by Mr. Lawrence, Jay Lender and Dan Povenmire, with Sean Dempsey as animation director; Lender and Povenmire also served as storyboard directors. This episode was in early production sometime between March 19 and September 18, 2000, as Dan Povenmire first drew Squidward for this episode's storyboards when he was 36 1/2 years old. Lender proposed to have Count Orlok of the 1922 silent film Nosferatu appear as a gag in the final scene. Series creator Stephen Hillenburg accepted Lender's proposal, with Lender noting that Hillenburg "gave [the staff] the opportunities to do things that would really be memorable, if you could sell him on it." Lender decided that the characters should refer to Orlok as "Nosferatu" so that he would be more broadly recognizable, and used a still from the film that he found on the Internet, while Nick Jennings photoshopped the smile on Orlok to make sure it matched Lender's board drawing. Before Orlok, Lender thought of "Floorboard Harry", a deleted gag that concludes the broadcast episode, in which he initially flickers the lights.

== Release ==
"Graveyard Shift" was originally released on the DVD compilation titled SpongeBob SquarePants: Nautical Nonsense and Sponge Buddies on March 12, 2002. The episode would not make its television debut until airing on Nickelodeon in the United States on September 6, 2002, at 8:00pm, with a TV-Y7 parental rating. It was also included on the SpongeBob SquarePants: The Complete 2nd Season DVD released on October 19, 2004. On September 22, 2009, the episode was released on the SpongeBob SquarePants: The First 100 Episodes, alongside all of the episodes of seasons one through five. On June 9, 2009, "Graveyard Shift" was released on the 10 Happiest Moments DVD.

== Reception ==
"Graveyard Shift"'s ending was praised for its humorous, unexplained cameo of Count Orlok, portrayed by Max Schreck.

"Graveyard Shift" received critical acclaim upon release and is often cited as one of the show's best episodes. Jordan Moreau, Katcy Stephan and David Viramontes of Variety ranked the episode the fifth-best SpongeBob episode, particularly calling the Nosferatu scene perfectly representative of "the nonsensical comedy that keeps SpongeBob fans hungry for more." Emily Esteem of WeGotThisCovered.com ranked the episode No. 2 on her "Top 10 Episodes of SpongeBob SquarePants" list, saying, "It is another scary episode of SpongeBob, and it's my favorite one." She added, "I love 'Graveyard Shift' for a myriad of reasons, but mostly because it puts the two SpongeBob SquarePants characters with the best chemistry together: Squidward and SpongeBob. The episode is kind of like a puzzle, and SpongeBob's relentless cheer in the midst of likely doom is inspiring." Mike Bedard of /Film ranked it No. 6 on his list of the 15 best SpongeBob SquarePants episodes. He said, "It's a masterclass in blending horror and comedy. Squidward's storyline is pretty creepy, but SpongeBob's ridiculous reactions don't detract from the drama one bit."

In his review for DVD Talk, Jason Bovberg praised the episode for its "spooky wonderfulness", stating that the episode scared his daughter. Paul Mavis of DVD Talk said, "A fun, 'scary' (for little kids) SpongeBob that adults will appreciate, 'Graveyard Shift' uses the old standby of the headless/handless/legless (take your pick) killer-seeking-revenge stories we all told as kids, and cleverly grafts it onto a 'SpongeBob at work' storyline." Mavis added, "I always enjoy it when Rodger Bumpass, the voice actor for Squidward, gets quiet and manipulative when he's shining SpongeBob on, and here's one of the best examples of that." He praised Count Orlok's cameo, "especially when they animate the vampire's face into a goofy, giddy smile." Mike Jackson of DVD Verdict said the episode is one of his "personal faves." He also said "The episode has everything that makes the show great: funny dialogue (the whole story of the Hash-Slinging Slasher is hilarious), clever sight gags (especially SpongeBob's regenerating limbs), and that aforementioned outta-nowhere ending that made me bust a gut."

The 2012 pop art painting The Walk Home, by American artist and designer KAWS, is based on a still from this episode. It sold at auction at Sotheby's for $6 million. The alterations to the image, originally from a shot where SpongeBob screams in terror at the story of the Hash-Slinging Slasher, have been described in the Sotheby's catalogue essay as emphasizing the universality of the character's existential anxiety, and as having "more in common with such emotionally-laden works as Francisco Goya's politically charged The Third of May 1808 than any plotline from the children's cartoon show".

In 2022, the episode's writer Jay Lender suggested that including Count Orlok in the episode expanded the audience for Nosferatu. The Count returns as a supporting character in season 11 and the prequel spin-off series Kamp Koral: SpongeBob's Under Years. In 2023, "Graveyard Shift" along with its companion segment, "Krusty Love", rank No. 5 in the highest rated SpongeBob SquarePants according to IMDb, with a user rating of 9.3 out of 10. Robert Eggers, the director of the 2024 Nosferatu remake, credited the SpongeBob SquarePants episode with introducing Count Orlok to younger audiences.
