= Super Bowl LIII halftime show =

Halftime show of the 2019 edition of the Super Bowl

- Date: February 3, 2019
- Location: Atlanta, Georgia, U.S.
- Venue: Mercedes-Benz Stadium
- Headliner: Maroon 5
- Special guests: Travis Scott; Big Boi
- Sponsor: Pepsi
- Director: Hamish Hamiliton
- Producer: Ricky Kirshner

Super Bowl halftime show chronology
LII (2018)	LIII (2019)	LIV (2020)

The Super Bowl LIII Halftime Show, officially known as the Pepsi Super Bowl LIII Halftime Show, took place on February 3, 2019, at Mercedes-Benz Stadium in Atlanta, Georgia, as part of Super Bowl LIII. It was headlined by Maroon 5, joined by rappers Big Boi and Travis Scott as guests.

Prior to the show, it was reported several musicians turned down offers to perform the show due to their support for Colin Kaepernick, who has accused the NFL and its franchises of colluding against him for his national anthem protests against police brutality. As such, Maroon 5, Big Boi, and Travis Scott, along with national anthem singer Gladys Knight, were criticized by fans and critics for accepting the invitation. In response to the controversy, Travis Scott only agreed to participate if the NFL made a donation to a charity supporting social justice, and Maroon 5 later announced a similar donation to Big Brothers Big Sisters of America. Following the death of SpongeBob SquarePants creator Stephen Hillenburg, an online petition to pay tribute to Hillenburg went viral (based on an episode that, itself, centered around a halftime show), leading to a short clip being created for the performance.

The show was universally panned by critics and audiences and is widely regarded to be one of the worst Super Bowl halftime shows of all time, with critics considering the show to be "boring" and "underwhelming". They also argued that the choice of Maroon 5 was intended to be "safe" and uncontroversial in the wake of the Kaepernick controversy. While cited as a highlight of the show, the SpongeBob clip received negative reviews for its short length; and a portion of the show where Adam Levine was shirtless received audience backlash in comparisons to Janet Jackson's 2004 performance.

== Background ==
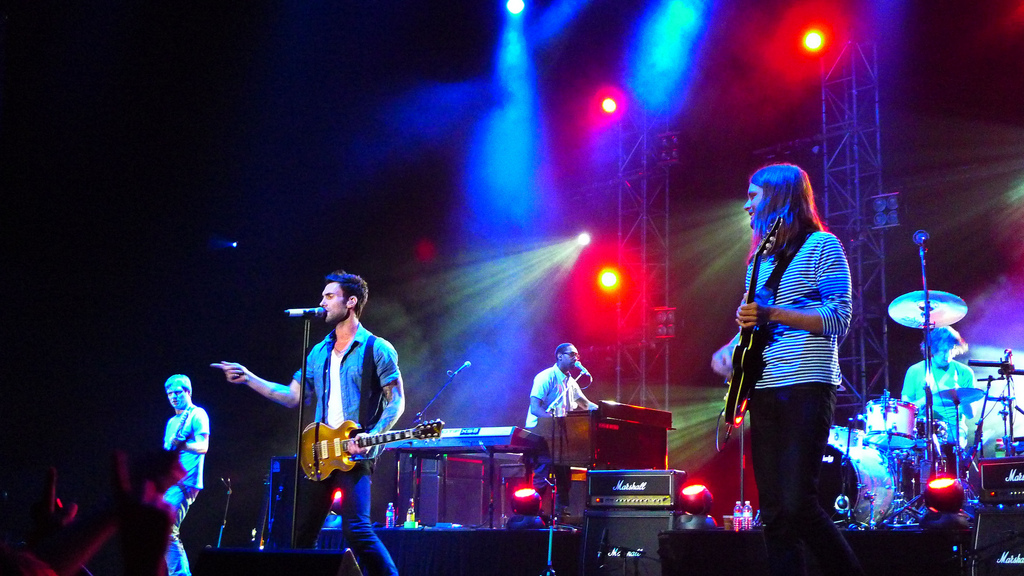
Maroon 5 performing in 2011

As early as September 2018, multiple sources had reported that Maroon 5 were to headline the Super Bowl LIII halftime show, but the NFL had not yet made an official announcement. In October 2018, it was reported that Pink and Rihanna had each declined an offer to headline, the former because the negotiation process was too lengthy for her taste and the latter due to her support of Colin Kaepernick. In December, Billboard reported that Houston-based rapper Travis Scott was expected to make a guest appearance. In February 2019, Zac Brown Band confirmed that they were the back-up choice, if Maroon 5 turned it down.

On January 13, 2019, the NFL officially announced that Maroon 5 would headline the show, joined by Scott and Big Boi, an Atlanta native and member of the hip-hop duo Outkast. In an interview, Maroon 5 lead singer Adam Levine explained that the band wanted to bring the halftime show "back to a time when it was a little more simple, when the focus was the connection to the songs."

After the death of Stephen Hillenburg, creator of the Nickelodeon cartoon SpongeBob SquarePants, on November 26, 2018, an online petition emerged requesting that David Glen Eisley's song "Sweet Victory"—featured in the episode "Band Geeks", which followed Squidward Tentacles as he organized an ensemble to perform the halftime show at the "Bubble Bowl"—be performed at the show. By December 24, 2018, the petition on Change.org had over one million signatures, and the Twitter account of Mercedes-Benz Stadium also acknowledged the campaign. During the halftime show, a short animation featuring Squidward, Mr. Krabs, Mrs. Puff, SpongeBob, and Patrick, as well as footage of the Bikini Bottom band from the episode, was used to introduce Scott for his performance of "Sicko Mode". According to animator Nico Colaleo, the animation was completed in a few days.

== Controversy ==
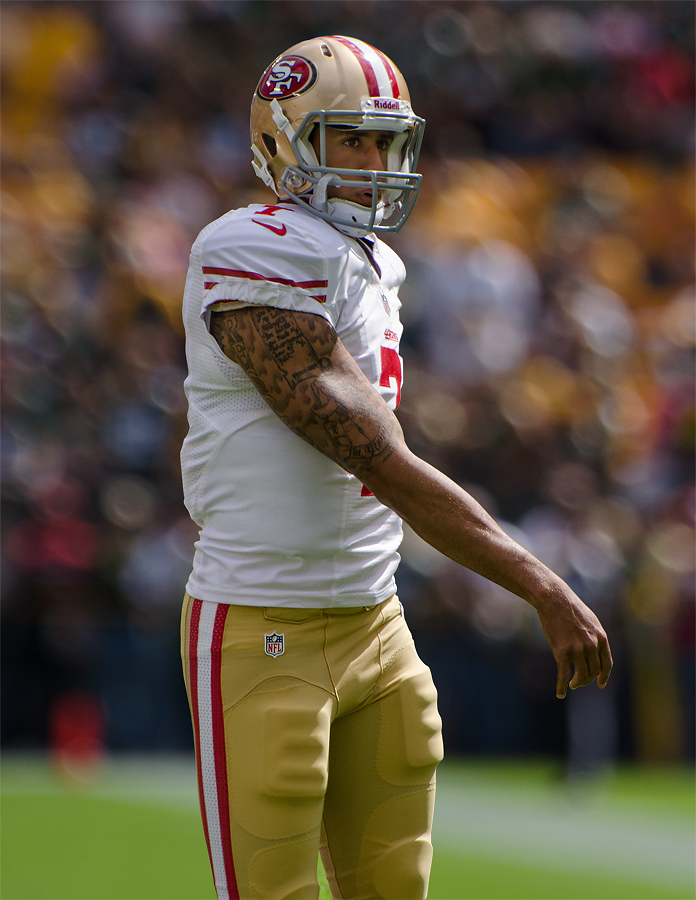
Several acts reportedly turned down invitations to perform the halftime show due to their support of Colin Kaepernick's protests against police brutality.

Maroon 5, Scott, and Big Boi faced criticism for their decision to perform at the halftime show, due to the alleged blacklisting of Colin Kaepernick by the NFL and its franchises for protesting police brutality by kneeling during the national anthem before games. Several artists—including Jay-Z, Cardi B, and Rihanna—reportedly turned down offers to headline the show as a display of solidarity. A petition was organized calling for Maroon 5 to drop out of the show and accusing them of "choosing to side with the NFL over its players."

In an interview, Kaepernick's attorney, Mark Geragos, compared Maroon 5's participation to strikebreaking, and argued that if the band wanted to cross the "intellectual picket line", they needed to "own it", explaining that "if anything, it's a cop out when you start talking about, 'I'm not a politician, I'm just doing the music.' Most of the musicians who have any kind of consciousness whatsoever understand what's going on here."

A week before the game, the halftime show's press conference was canceled by the NFL. Although the league stated that Maroon 5 had wanted to focus on their preparations for the show, media outlets theorized that the band was trying to avoid the possibility of having to discuss the controversy. In an interview with Entertainment Tonight, Levine discussed the band's decision to accept the gig and explained, "I silenced all the noise and listened to myself and made my decision based upon how I felt... I'm not in the right profession if I can't handle a little bit of controversy. It's what it is. We expected it. We'd like to move on from it and speak through the music."

In response to the controversy, Scott agreed to participate in the halftime show only if the NFL joined him in donating $500,000 to Dream Corps, an organization founded by Van Jones that supports social justice efforts. Maroon 5 subsequently announced that they had joined with the NFL and their label Interscope Records to donate the same amount to Big Brothers Big Sisters of America.

== Reception ==
The performance was universally panned. In the United States, the Super Bowl LIII halftime show attracted 99.04 million viewers, The viewership for the halftime show was slightly higher than the game itself, which was viewed by an average of 98.4 million television viewers.

Dominic Patten of Deadline Hollywood called the show "terrible" and stated it lacked "lift-off or soul." Writing for Yahoo! Entertainment, Lyndsey Parker called it the "dullest ... most underwhelming and instantly forgettable halftime show of all time." Alex Suskind of Entertainment Weekly called it "lackluster" and "boring". Greg Kot of The Baltimore Sun called it an "empty-calorie display of corporate-pop competence." Clémence Michallon of The Independent gave it two stars out of five and stated it "failed to impress."

Jon Caramanica of The New York Times felt that "in a performance that was dynamically flat, mushy at the edges, worthy of something much worse than derision: a shrug. It was an inessential performance from a band that might have lost some moral authority if it had any moral authority to lose." Rhian Daly of NME said it was "surprise-free, trite, and soulless" and "with Maroon 5's set, [Levine]'s given the world an easy target – one that's boring, trite, and saying absolutely nothing of any value whatsoever." Jake Nevins of The Guardian also gave the performance two out of five stars, writing "Adam Levine's torso can't save tedious affair." However, Kevin Coffey of the Omaha World-Herald said "it was exactly what it needed to be."

Maeve McDermott of USA Today observed that the performance felt "safe" and "dialed-in", with "zero surprises and nothing that could add to the headache the league has already endured", and noting that Maroon 5's portions of the show relied heavily on early hits from their debut album rather than newer material (aside from "Girls Like You", "Sugar" and "Moves like Jagger"). Feeling that the guest artists were more exciting (although noting Scott's portion, due to the SpongeBob SquarePants introduction and crowd surfing exit, was the only "genuinely weird" moment of the show), she wrote that the choice of Maroon 5 as headliner was "misguided" for a Super Bowl held in Atlanta, the "nexus of hip-hop", and that the show was "distinctive only for how uncontroversial it was, how wholly a missed opportunity it represented, and how much of Levine's truly abysmal dance moves we were all forced to watch." In 2021, Patrick Ryan of USA Today retrospectively wrote that it ranks among the worst halftime shows of the 2010s.

The short clip featuring the cast of SpongeBob SquarePants was noted as a highlight of the show by several news outlets. However, fans of the animated show had a more negative reaction, with many venting their anger on social media that Maroon 5 did not play the song "Sweet Victory" as requested by the online petition. The Dallas Stars of the National Hockey League featured a performance of the song (a slightly altered version of the original SpongeBob SquarePants scene) between periods of a game two days before the Super Bowl, which was posted online one day after the Super Bowl.

Fifty-five complaints were sent to the FCC over the halftime show, due to a sequence in which Levine removed his shirt. The complaints alleged that it was a double standard for CBS to be fined for briefly showing a female breast on-air during a previous halftime show, but to receive no punishment for showing a bare male chest. It was a small number compared to the 1,300 that would be filed over the next year's show.

Maroon 5 saw a sales surge of nearly 500% following the group's Super Bowl LIII performance, according to Nielsen.

== Setlist ==
External videos
- Full Super Bowl LIII halftime show – via the NFL's official channel on YouTube.
- Super Bowl LIII halftime show – via Maroon 5's official channel on YouTube.

1. "Harder to Breathe"
2. "This Love"
3. Trumpet fanfare (interlude) (contains scene from "Band Geeks" and features the cast of SpongeBob SquarePants)
4. "Sicko Mode" (Travis Scott solo)
5. "Girls Like You"
6. "She Will Be Loved"
7. "Kryptonite (I'm on It)" (Big Boi solo)
8. "The Way You Move" (Big Boi solo)
9. "Sugar"
10. "Moves like Jagger"

Setlist adapted from Sports Illustrated, CBS Sports, and Yahoo! News

== See also ==
- 2019 in American television
