= Corky Carroll =

American surfer

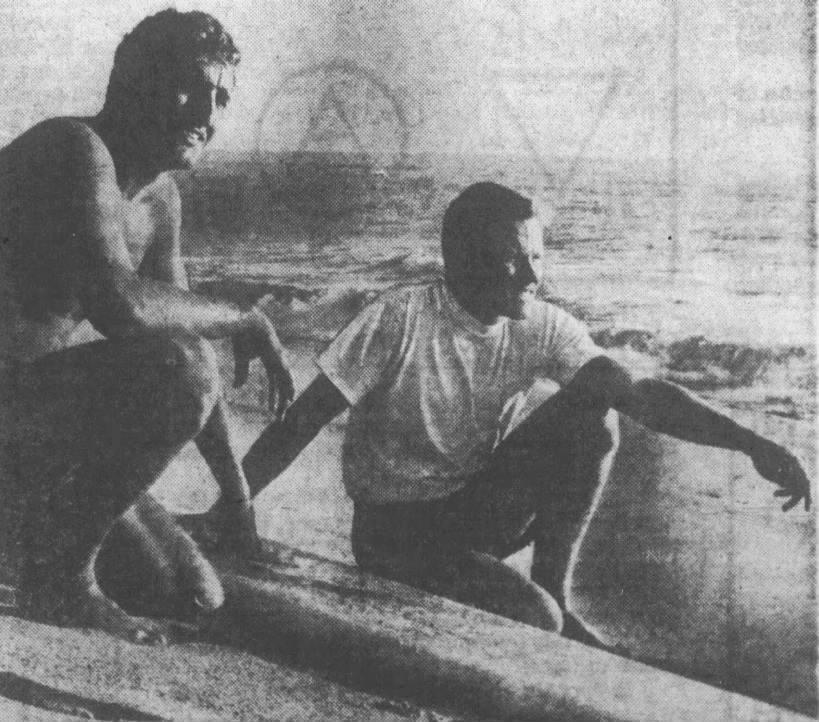
- Carroll (right) with Mike Doyle, 1964

Personal information
- Born: September 29, 1947 (age 78) Alhambra, California
- Years active: 1959–1972
- Height: 6 ft 0 in (183 cm)
- Website: Corky Carroll's Surf School

Surfing career
- Sport: Surfing
- Major achievements: US Surfing Championship (1966-70); International Surfing Championship (3 times)

Surfing specifications
- Stance: Goofy

Corky Carroll (born September 29, 1947) is a professional American surfer and is considered a pioneer in the sport by becoming the first real professional surfer as well as being the first to make paid endorsements.

== Life and career ==
Carroll started his career in 1959 at a very early age and by the time he retired in 1972, he was only 24 years old. From 1966 to 1970 he won the United States Surfing Championship and also won the International Surfing Championship three times. Altogether, Carroll won over 100 surfing competitions. After his surfing career, he became a musician and recorded nine albums along with writing several books on surfing. He subsequently opened a surfing school in California and designed surf boards. He frequently serves as the color commentator for world surfing events such as the annual competition in Huntington Beach, and pens a column in the Orange County Register. Television audiences can be familiar with him through a cameo as The Grubby Grouper on the SpongeBob SquarePants episode "Bubble Buddy." He resides with his wife and family in Mexico in their beach-side home. He has a home in Zihuatanejo, Mexico where he offers surf adventure trips.

In 1959 at age 11, Carroll placed 3rd in his first surf contest, the inaugural U.S. Surfboard Championship, at Huntington Beach, the first major surf contest ever to be held in California.

Carroll helped design the first authentic surf trunks with Nancy Katin, which are still in production today.

=== 1960s ===
In 1962 Carroll won the junior division of the San Clemente Surf Capades contest. In 1963 he landed a sponsorship with Hobie Alter, the largest surfboard manufacturer in the world at that time, and becomes the youngest member of the surf team. In 1964 at age 16, he became the first surfer ever to be paid to surf. In the same year Bruce Brown invited Corky to join The Endless Summer promotional tour in order to promote the surf movie, and he appeared on The Tonight Show Starring Johnny Carson in New York and teaching Johnny to skateboard, and appeared on the first of three Merv Griffin Shows.

In 1965 Carroll won first place at the Tom Morey Nose Riding Invitational – The first contest ever to pay prize money, and signed an endorsement contract with Jantzen Sportswear appearing on the back cover of almost every Surfer Magazine for seven straight years. In 1966 he achieved USSA (surf tour) #1 ranking and the first of five consecutive “best all around surfer” awards. In 1967 he won the International Big Wave Championship in Peru. At this time he designed the first production short board solid in the U.S. called the 1967 Hobie Corky Carroll “Mini-model." He also appeared on the TV show “What’s My Line” (July 2, 1967), trying to stump the panel as the world's first “professional” surfer. It was at this time that Carroll's surf music interest began. He became friends with fellow surfer/musician Dennis Wilson of the Beach Boys while filming his surfing for the background video, and met Mike Nesmith and the rest of the Monkees.

In 1968 Carroll was voted #1 surfer in the world by his surfing peers, - the award Carroll has stated he considers the greatest award of his career. He also won World Small Wave Championship in Florida, and was pictured on the cover of Surfer Magazine Hanging Ten. His Hobie CC Mini model achieved record sales. From 1962 to 1972 Corky won over 100 surf contests worldwide.

=== 1970s ===
In 1978 Carroll released a novelty single phonograph record "Skateboard Bill" / B: "Pocket Rocket" (1978), and then as Corky Carroll And The Coolwater Casuals with Mike Nesmith of the Monkees as producer "Tan Punk On Boards", B-side "From Pizza Towers To Defeat", (1979) which was a hit gold record.

=== 1990s ===
In the early 1990s, Carroll worked as a full-time tennis coach while also managing Windansea Surf Shop in Huntington Beach part-time. In 1996, he partnered with Rick Walker to start Corky Carroll's Surf School, based at Bolsa Chica State Beach. This was the first surf school opened in Huntington Beach.

=== 2000s ===
In 2001, he voiced "famous surf bum, Grubby Grouper" in the Spongebob Squarepants episode "Bubble Buddy." The surfboard-hauling Grouper, covered in dirt and sand, greets his "groupies" and shakes Pearl Krabs's hand before driving away. The character reappeared in the 2019 television film, SpongeBob's Big Birthday Blowout.

Achievements
Preceded by -	Smirnoff World Pro-Am Surfing Championships World Champion; 1969	Succeeded by Nat Young
