= Band Geeks =

- SpongeBob SquarePants episode
- Title card
- Episode no.: Season 2 Episode 15b
- Directed by: Aaron Springer
- Written by: C. H. Greenblatt; Aaron Springer; Merriwether Williams
- Production code: 5571-173
- Original air date: September 7, 2001

Episode chronology
← Previous "The Secret Box"	Next → "Graveyard Shift"
- SpongeBob SquarePants (season 2)

"Band Geeks" is the second segment of the 15th episode of the second season, and the 35th overall episode of the American animated television series SpongeBob SquarePants. It originally aired on Nickelodeon in the United States on September 7, 2001. It was written by C.H. Greenblatt, Aaron Springer, and Merriwether Williams, and the animation was directed by Frank Weiss. Springer served as director, and Greenblatt served as storyboard artist.

"Band Geeks" follows Squidward as he recruits the citizens of Bikini Bottom to play in a marching band at the Bubble Bowl football game. Widely considered one of the best episodes of the entire series, and holding the show's highest IMDb rating of 9.8/10, the episode received universal acclaim from both fans and television critics alike. The episode won Best Sound Editing in Television – Animation at the 2002 Golden Reel Awards.

The episode holds a lasting cultural impact most notably through the NFL and Super Bowl tie-ins, and is often referenced in the NFL on Nickelodeon broadcast.

== Plot ==
Squidward gets a call from his wealthy former high school classmate and rival, Squilliam Fancyson, who has succeeded in everything in which Squidward has failed, including music. Squilliam tells Squidward he has become the leader of a "big, fancy band" scheduled to play at a venue called the Bubble Bowl, but he will be busy at the time of the concert and cannot attend. He derisively suggests that Squidward's band should substitute for his at the Bubble Bowl, correctly assuming that Squidward does not have one; however, Squidward defiantly insists that he does have a band and accepts the challenge. Placing flyers all over Bikini Bottom, he assembles a large marching band composed of various residents.

During their single week of rehearsal, the band performs consistently poorly and fails to improve at all. On the last day of practice, the band members start blaming each other for their poor performance, and a brawl ensues. As the rehearsal ends, Squidward expresses his disappointment in them, despondently tells them not to perform, and goes home, distraught over his failure. However, SpongeBob convinces the other band members to go through with the performance for Squidward's sake, and he takes command of their training.

On the day of the concert, Squidward and Squilliam meet at the venue entrance, where Squidward claims that his band died in an accident; the band then immediately arrives, and Squidward reluctantly proceeds with the performance. They enter the Bubble Bowl, a large glass dome that elevates them into a crowded Simmons Bank Liberty Stadium in Memphis, Tennessee. Squidward cringes in fear as he begins to conduct, but to his surprise, the band is tremendously successful, performing "Sweet Victory" for the human crowd. Squilliam enters a state of shock and faints as paramedics rush out, leaving Squidward to triumphantly throw his baton away and celebrate as the band continues playing while he joyously leaps into the air, ending the episode on a freeze-frame shot.

== Production ==
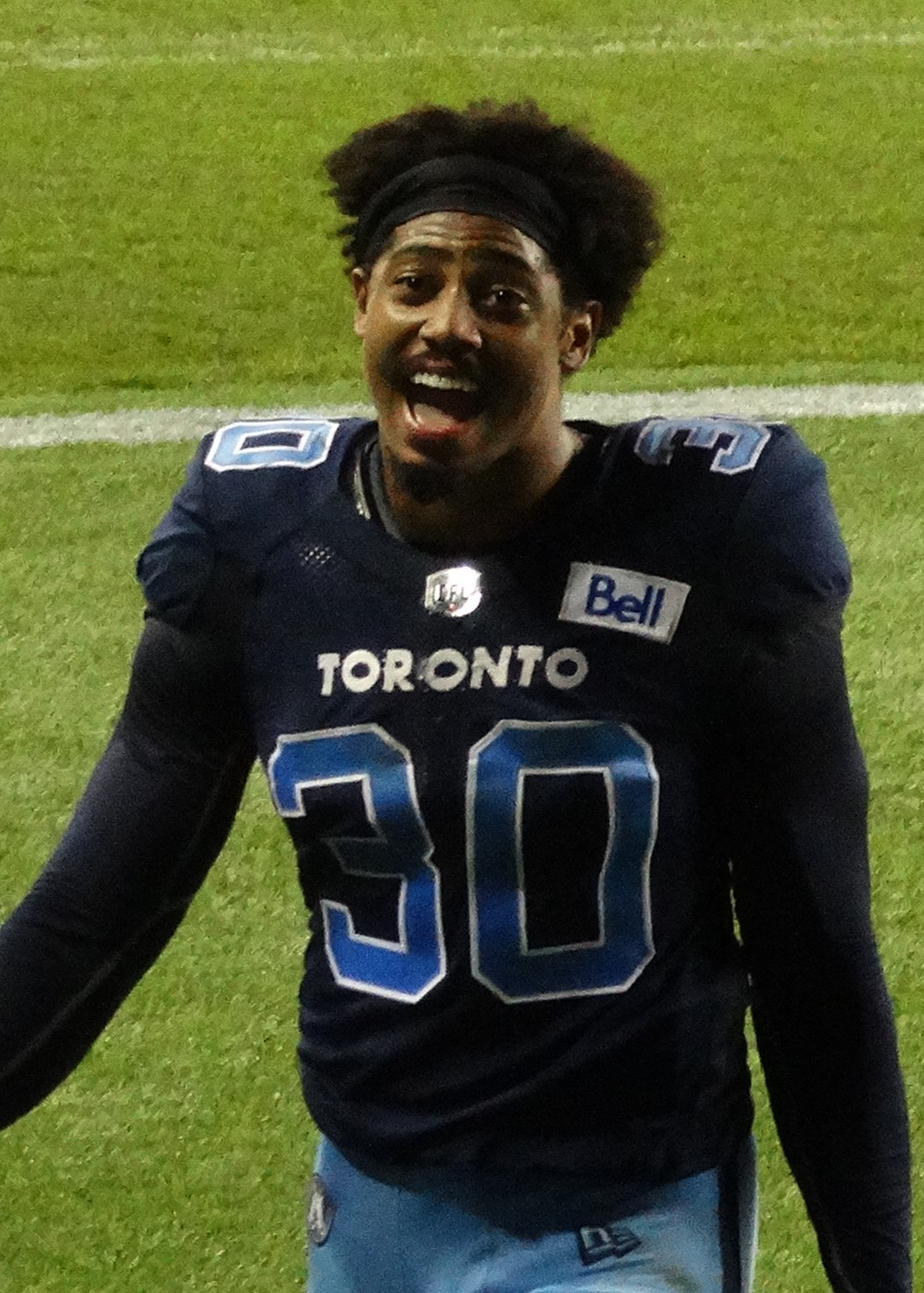
Travis Feeney of the Tampa Bay Bandits (the Tampa Bay Bandits were featured in the episode during the characters' performance of "Sweet Victory").

"Band Geeks" was directed by Aaron Springer, and was written by Springer, C. H. Greenblatt, and Merriwether Williams. Frank Weiss served as animation director, and Greenblatt worked as storyboard artist. The writers started to work for "Band Geeks" with the idea of a rival. Williams said, "We always wanted to do a rival show, and I think we tried to do a rival show for SpongeBob, and it wasn't working. So we came up with the idea of a rival for Squidward and, in some ways it's Squidward's story, and SpongeBob and Patrick are just kind of around." The idea of having a band was unspecified. Williams remarked, "I forget who was in band. I was not in a band, but I think maybe Doug Lawrence was in a band. I think Steve Hillenburg was in a band, too." (Note: Hillenburg said that he was a "band geek" in high school who played the trumpet.)

The music used in the segment of the episode where Squidward's marching band is playing while coming down the street was from Nick Carr, the series' music editor. He found a piece of marching band music that was a band intentionally playing poorly, but sound designer Jeff Hutchins suggested to have the marching band not be able to play their instruments properly. He brought his portable DAT recorder to a musical instrument retail store and met two men who worked on its loading dock, packaging and shipping the instruments. Hutchins made the two men play most of the instruments in the store terribly.

Upon returning to the studio with the sound effects, he built a marching band, one instrument at a time. Hutchins said, "They weren't in any key and had no rhythm whatsoever. When you heard it, you just had to say 'Ouch!'" Hutchins played the sound effects for series creator Hillenburg for review. Hillenburg rejected it, saying "it was too far over the edge." Hutchins said, "a lot of effort for something that lasts only 15 seconds on screen. In this case, the whole thing never made it on the air."

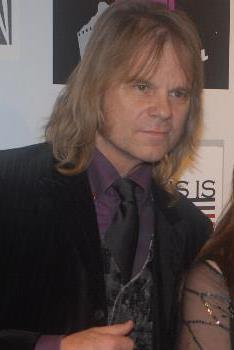
David Glen Eisley's song "Sweet Victory" was featured in the episode.

The writers and storyboard artists thought of "a big number" sequence at the end, where everyone would rally together for Squidward, feeling that the story outline "called for it". Storyboard artist Greenblatt added that it "usually helps to have the music ahead of time to board to". The writers were able to find music for this sequence, as Nickelodeon has a library of royalty-free music. The writers listened to various marching band tunes, however, they felt that the idea that the music would just be the marching band playing well "didn't seem terribly funny".

The writers later decided on David Glen Eisley's song "Sweet Victory" as it stood out from the other tracks in the library. Greenblatt said, "It was different than what we were looking for, but it was so amazing that we knew we had to use it. So we boarded the sequence to the music, and it felt like such a better ending than any song we could have written on our own." The live action Bubble Bowl crowd is a combination of footage from a United States Football League game featuring the Memphis Showboats and the Tampa Bay Bandits on June 16, 1984, and footage shot specifically for the episode.

== Release ==
"Band Geeks" originally aired on Nickelodeon in the United States on September 7, 2001. It was released on the DVD compilation titled SpongeBob SquarePants: Halloween on August 27, 2002, and on SpongeBob SquarePants: Home Sweet Pineapple that was released on January 4, 2005. The episode was also included in SpongeBob SquarePants: The Complete 2nd Season DVD released on October 19, 2004. On September 22, 2009, "Band Geeks" was released on the SpongeBob SquarePants: The First 100 Episodes DVD, alongside all episodes of seasons one through five.

== Reception ==
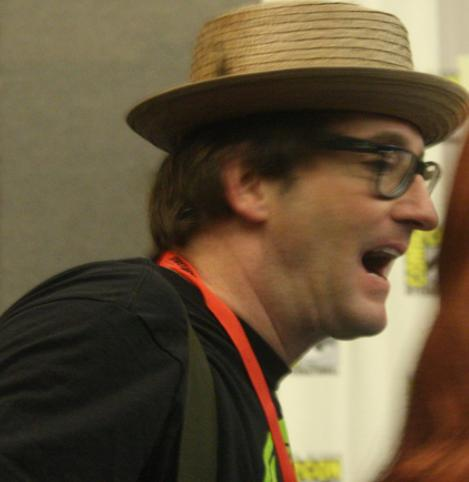
Tom Kenny in 2009

"Band Geeks" received universal acclaim from both fans and critics. Upon release, the episode was honored at the 2002 Golden Reel Awards for Best Sound Editing in Television – Animation category. Tom Kenny, SpongeBob's voice actor, considers "Band Geeks" one of his favorite episodes. In a 2009 review, Michael Cavna of The Washington Post ranked the episode at No. 5 in his "The Top Five SpongeBob Episodes: We Pick 'Em" list. He said "Squidward's mix of artistic aspiration in the face of goading, humiliation and unrelenting sub-mediocrity made this a kids' episode that adults can experience on a whole 'nother level." The Guardian ranked "Band Geeks" the second-best episode of the show, next to "Krusty Krab Training Video". Jordan Moreau, Katcy Stephan and David Viramontes of Variety ranked it the best SpongeBob episode. They praised the Bubble Bowl performance and said that the episode "builds toward that moment through an episode packed to the gills with visual gag after visual gag".

Emily Estep of WeGotThisCovered.com ranked the episode as the fourth-best SpongeBob SquarePants episode, explaining that "most of the gags in 'Band Geeks' center around Squidward's bleak existence, but it's also stuffed with one-liners from and about each of the characters on the show, such as the line 'These claws ain't just for attractin' mates!' from an about-to-brawl Mr. Krabs, and when Squidward says, 'No, Patrick, mayonnaise is not an instrument,' in response to an inevitable query from the stupid star." In his ranking of the 25 best episodes, Andrew Firriolo of BuzzFeed placed it at No. 1, saying that it "really has it all: a plethora of epic quotes, witty humor, iconic music, and most of all, one of the few times we see Squidward truly happy. Sweet victory, indeed." Mike Bedard of /Film describes the scene where the band plays the song "Sweet Victory" as making "cartoon history", Barry Levitt of Vulture shares the same opinion and called the moment "epic", while Lizzie Mango of Paste considered it iconic and said it was "the best musical number."

"Band Geeks" was one of the top episodes as chosen by viewers at Nick.com in the event "The Best Day Ever Marathon" held in 2006. In 2012, Nickelodeon in the United Kingdom launched an event called "SpongeBob's Top 100", where viewers can vote at Nick.co.uk for their favorite episode. With over 160,000 votes cast, "Band Geeks" emerged as the winner. In 2023, "Band Geeks" along with its companion segment, "The Secret Box", ranked No. 1 in the highest rated SpongeBob SquarePants according to IMDb, with a user rating of 9.8 out of 10.

== Impact ==
The featured song "Sweet Victory" was later released on the series soundtrack album SpongeBob SquarePants: The Yellow Album on November 15, 2005. "Sweet Victory" went from being a largely unknown production music track to surpassing 300,000 iTunes downloads in one year after its exposure on the show.

Following the death of series creator Stephen Hillenburg in November 2018, a Change.org petition was created which requested that the NFL pay tribute to him by playing "Sweet Victory" during the halftime show for Super Bowl LIII, which received over 1.1 million signatures. Speculation about the song's inclusion was fueled by the Mercedes-Benz Stadium, the host stadium for Super Bowl LIII, posting a scene from the episode on their official Twitter account, and a teaser video by the headlining act Maroon 5 featuring a clip of SpongeBob in the weeks leading up to that year's Super Bowl.

During the halftime show on February 3, a short clip of Squidward and a snippet of the Bubble Bowl performance scene were used to announce guest singer Travis Scott, who Squidward described as "a true musical genius who needs no introduction." Many social media users were critical of the failure to include the "Sweet Victory" song and found the brief animated segment to be an inadequate tribute to Hillenburg. CBS News reported that the response by SpongeBob fans was mixed and noted the positive response from the animated show's official Twitter account. Despite the show's mixed reception, on-demand streams of "Sweet Victory" increased by 566% after the Super Bowl, going up from 46,000 streams on February 1–2 to 310,000 on February 3–4. This led the track to enter Billboard's United States Hot Rock Songs chart at number 23 and the Kid Digital Song Sales chart at number two, just under Pinkfong's "Baby Shark." The day after the game, the Dallas Stars' Twitter page uploaded a modified version of the full "Sweet Victory" sequence, in which the band's uniforms were altered from red to green to match the Stars' colors, with the title "The #SuperBowl halftime show fans deserve". The Stars' video had previously been shown during their February 1 game against the Minnesota Wild.

During the SpongeBob SportsPants Countdown Special, before the NFL on Nickelodeon Wild Card matchup between the Chicago Bears against the New Orleans Saints, the "Sweet Victory" sequence was #1 on the countdown. Several NFL stars appear during the sequence. In February 2021, a new animation of SpongeBob performing the song from the episode was featured in the Super Bowl LV commercial to promote ViacomCBS' launch of the Paramount+ streaming service, as various characters from the ViacomCBS portfolio reached the summit of Paramount Mountain. The commercial and its usage of the song received a positive reception, with many believing the inclusion of the song was done to make up for the failure to include it in the halftime show two years earlier.

Prior to airing their alternate broadcast of Super Bowl LVIII, Nickelodeon used "Sweet Victory" to kick off its broadcast of the game.
