= Sailor Mouth =

- SpongeBob SquarePants segment
- Title card
- Episode no.: Season 2 Episode 18a
- Directed by: Andrew Overtoom; Walt Dohrn; Paul Tibbitt
- Written by: Walt Dohrn; Paul Tibbitt; Merriwether Williams
- Original air date: September 21, 2001

Episode chronology
| ← Previous "I'm with Stupid" | Next → "Artist Unknown" |
- SpongeBob SquarePants (season 2)

"Sailor Mouth" is the first segment of the 18th episode of the second season, and the 38th overall episode of the American animated television series SpongeBob SquarePants. It originally aired on Nickelodeon in the United States on September 21, 2001. In the episode, SpongeBob reads a "bad word" off a dumpster behind the Krusty Krab, but does not know what it means, (Note: "Bad word number 11" is bleeped by the sound of dolphin vocalizations, and other sounds such as seal and seagull vocalizations, lighthouse foghorns, and honking are used for the other bad words at the end.) which gets him into trouble with others.

The episode was directed by Andrew Overtoom for the animation and Walt Dohrn and Paul Tibbitt for the storyboards, and written by Dohrn, Tibbitt, and Merriwether Williams, while Carson Kugler, William Reiss, and Erik Wiese worked as storyboard artists. The episode implicitly satirizes use of swear words among children, based on the writers' own childhood experiences.

The episode was well-received from critics and fans, with various members of the SpongeBob SquarePants crew considering it to be one of their favorites due to its satirical nature. However, the episode was not immune to negative reception, and was criticized by watchdog media group the Parents Television Council, who interpreted the episode as an example of promoting use of profanity among children.

== Plot ==
An excerpt from "Sailor Mouth", where SpongeBob (and Patrick) uses recurring profanity much to the shock and disgust to the show's background characters, while the assumed profanity is replaced by dolphin sounds

When SpongeBob goes around to the back of the Krusty Krab to take out the trash, he reads some graffiti written on a dumpster, one of which contains a word he does not understand. SpongeBob asks Patrick, who says that the word is a "sentence enhancer" which is used "when you want to talk fancy." The next day, SpongeBob walks into the Krusty Krab and says the word to Patrick and then says it over the intercom, causing the customers to complain and leave angrily. Squidward then informs Mr. Krabs, who firmly explains to them that they were using a bad word—specifically, the bad word is number 11, and it is in a list of 13 bad words that they should never use (to which Squidward interjects that he thought there were only 7, to which Mr. Krabs says, "not if you're a sailor."). Upon hearing Mr. Krabs' warning, SpongeBob and Patrick agree to never use number 11 or any of the 13 bad words.

Later, they play their favorite game, Eels and Escalators (a pastiche of Snakes and Ladders); SpongeBob loses and accidentally uses number 11 in frustration. Patrick then races to the Krusty Krab to tell Mr. Krabs, with SpongeBob trying to stop him. Patrick also accidentally uses the word during the chase, leading an exasperated SpongeBob to burst through the front door and attempt to tell Mr. Krabs that Patrick said the bad word; Patrick arrives shortly after and makes a simultaneous, similarly unintelligible attempt to tell on SpongeBob. Eventually, Mr. Krabs stops their gibberish explanations and tells them to simply explain the problem. Once they do, the shocked Mr. Krabs angrily removes them from the restaurant and prepares a punishment. Feeling remorseful, SpongeBob and Patrick apologize to one another and make a vow to stop using the bad word altogether.

As Mr. Krabs is about to give them their task of painting the restaurant as punishment, he accidentally hits his foot on a rock, prompting him to yell out all 13 bad words in pain. When SpongeBob and Patrick hear the bad words, they run to Mama Krabs' house to tattle on him. The three reach her house at the same time, and all explain what happened at once, saying the same bad words in the process. After she briefly faints, Mr. Krabs accuses them of causing her to pass out, but before they can argue, Mama Krabs regains consciousness and blames them all for their actions. She then tells them to paint her house as punishment. Later on, Mama Krabs goes to reward them with lemonade for their hard work, but she accidentally hits her foot on a rock like Mr. Krabs did. When she complains about her injury, SpongeBob, Patrick, and Mr. Krabs are shocked at her apparent bad language, though the noise she made turns out to be Old Man Jenkins honking in his jalopy, much to everyone's amusement.

== Production ==
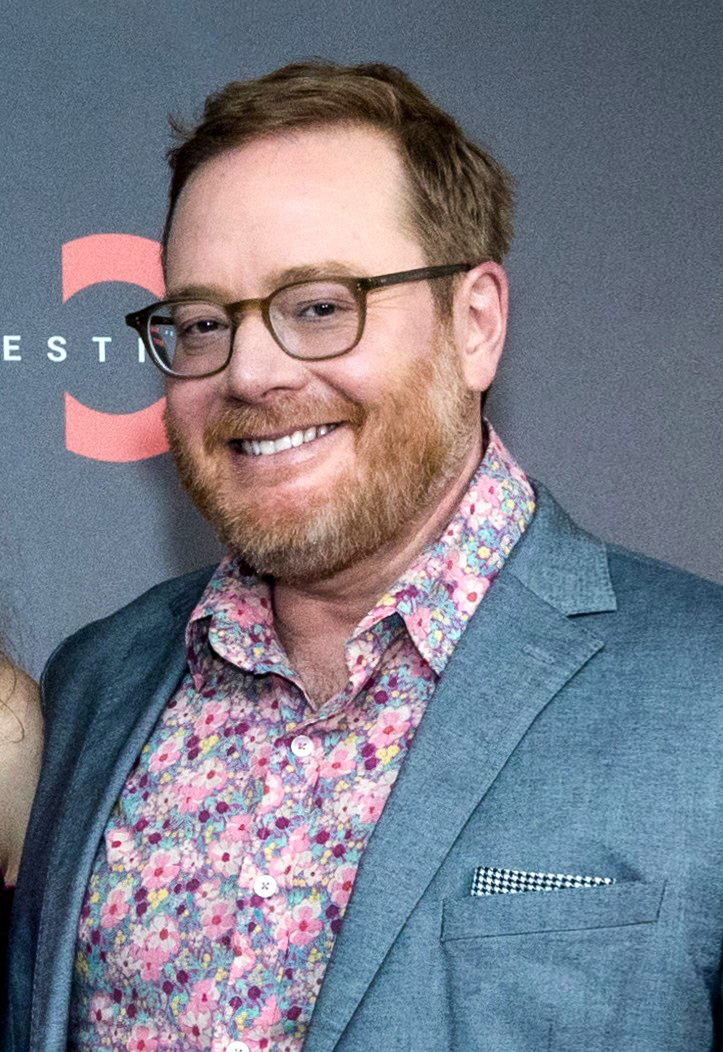
Walt Dohrn, shown here in 2023, wrote the episode with Paul Tibbitt and Merriwether Williams.

The animation of "Sailor Mouth" was directed by Andrew Overtoom, and the episode was written by Walt Dohrn, Paul Tibbitt, and Merriwether Williams. Dohrn and Tibbitt served as the episode's storyboard directors, and Carson Kugler, William Reiss and Erik Wiese worked as storyboard artists. Series creator Stephen Hillenburg has described the episode plot as "a classic thing all kids go through." Much of the storyline for the episode was inspired by the writers' own experiences from childhood. The episode originally aired on Nickelodeon in the United States on September 21, 2001. The episode marks the introduction of Mr. Krabs' mother, Mama Krabs, who was voiced by former SpongeBob SquarePants creative producer and executive producer Paul Tibbitt.

The writing staff used their individual childhood experiences as inspirations to come up with much of the story lines for this episode. The idea for "Sailor Mouth" was inspired by creative director Derek Drymon's experience when he "got in trouble for saying the f-word in front of [his] mother." Drymon cited "the scene where Patrick is running to Mr. Krabs to tattle, with SpongeBob chasing him" as one that is reflective of his experience. The end of the episode, where Mr. Krabs uses more profanity than SpongeBob and Patrick, was also inspired "by the fact that [Drymon's] mother has a sailor mouth herself."

The initial decision to use dolphin noises in place of a traditional bleep was influenced by concerns over the episode's suitability for its audience. Stephen Hillenburg recalled in 2016, "I pitched the idea that SpongeBob and Patrick learn a swearword. Everyone said no. I couldn't even use a bleep. So I used a dolphin sound instead." Voice actor Tom Kenny reveals in the description of this episode in the iTunes collection SpongeBob SquarePants: Tom Kenny's Top 20 that they actually improvised fake profanities that would be censored by the humorous sound effects later. He adds jokingly, "I was laughing so hard [recording this episode], they recorded me while I lay on the floor of the sound booth."

The scene where SpongeBob and Patrick playing a game of Eels and Escalators was difficult for the crew to animate, since many shots featured certain board pieces changing location. Storyboard artist Erik Wiese admitted that it was a challenge to storyboard Walt Dohrn's idea and vision of the Eels and Escalators scene.

Tom Kenny talked about this episode prior to its airing on May 18, 2001, in an interview seen in various national newspaper articles about the show. "In one episode I like, which hasn't aired yet, SpongeBob and Patrick pick up a curse word from Mr. Krabs. They walk around saying it and getting in trouble the whole episode, even though they don't know what it means. Every time they say it, there's the sound of a loud foghorn."

=== Uncensored cut ===
In a 2016 ConnectiCon panel, Kenny revealed the existence of an uncensored cut of the episode that the public would "never be allowed to hear, ever". According to Kenny, the original script called for the voice actors to ad-lib fake profanities, but this proved to be too difficult and time-consuming. At Kenny's suggestion, Stephen Hillenburg granted permission for the actors to actually swear, reasoning that the final cut was always intended to be censored regardless.

At the 2021 Los Angeles Comic Con, Kenny and co-star Rodger Bumpass once again addressed the "uncensored cut", where Bumpass also confirmed the cut's existence. The latter would go on to comment that the studio would routinely record and archive all takes for every episode, including the unedited takes for "Sailor Mouth". Bumpass speculated that the recording is still in the possession of Nickelodeon, along with other "off-color" takes.

== Release ==
"Sailor Mouth" was released on the DVD compilation called SpongeBob SquarePants: Sea Stories on November 5, 2002. It was also included in the SpongeBob SquarePants: The Complete 2nd Season DVD released on October 5, 2004. On September 22, 2009, "Sailor Mouth" was released on the SpongeBob SquarePants: The First 100 Episodes DVD, alongside all the episodes of seasons one through five.

== Reception ==
Barry Levitt of Vulture included "Sailor Mouth" in his "25 Essential Episodes of SpongeBob SquarePants" list, lauding the episode's numerous gags. John Witiw of MovieWeb ranked "Sailor Mouth" ninth in his "Top 10 Funniest Episodes to Re-watch as an Adult" ranking. He noted that as the episode uses dolphin noises to censor the swear words, older viewers could fill in the blanks for themselves.

Erik Wiese, who helped to storyboard "Sailor Mouth", considers it to be his favorite episode, mainly due to its random and satirical nature, saying "Sometimes SpongeBob just catches me off-guard." In an interview with Paul Tibbitt, one of the episode's writers, he said that "Sailor Mouth" is his second favorite SpongeBob episode. The Eels and Escalators board game from the episode has become a memorable scene among fans. In 2021, BoxLunch and Nickelodeon collaborated to produce a re-creation of the board game.

=== Controversy ===
"Simply, the group goofed by citing an episode of the cartoon series called "Sailor Mouth" as a touch-point for bad language. [...] Here's the funny thing: The episode is all about the perils of using bad language[...] Those words are never heard, ever, and are replaced with more dolphin sounds than you'll get in a day at Sea World [sic] [...] The PTC, of course, saw fit to use this positive episode as a negative. The group's media release claimed the dolphin sounds represent the F-bomb and a word for buttocks. Those words do not exist in the episode - and are only created in the minds of adults or young folks exposed to such language in the schoolyard or, dare I say, at home."

— Richard Huff, New York Daily News.

In 2006, a content analysis report by the Parents Television Council, a watchdog media group alleged that the SpongeBob SquarePants episode "Sailor Mouth" was an implicit attempt to promote and satirize use of profanity among children, highlighting a 2005 repeat broadcast of the episode. The group's members also cited the episode as an example of how levels of profane, sexual, and violent activity have increased in children's television programming. The episode originally aired during the 2001–2002 television season, ironically the season in which the PTC named SpongeBob SquarePants among the best programs on cable television. Nickelodeon, in response to the report, said "It's sad and a little desperate that they stopped to literally putting profane language in the mouths of our characters to make a point. Has the FCC looked at this?" Richard Huff of the New York Daily News criticized the report for misinterpreting "Sailor Mouth" over its intent to satirize profanity implicitly.

== See also ==
- "Rude Removal", a similar unaired episode of Dexter's Laboratory.
