= Aaron Springer =

American animator (born 1973)

- Born: September 5, 1973 (age 53); San Diego, California, U.S.
- Education: California Institute of the Arts
- Occupations: Cartoonist, writer, director, artist, animator, voice actor
- Years active: 1994–present
- Known for: Billy Dilley's Super-Duper Subterranean Summer; Korgoth of Barbaria; SpongeBob SquarePants; Mickey Mouse
- Website: funtowne.com

Aaron Springer (born September 5, 1973) is an American cartoonist, animator, artist, writer, director, and voice actor. He is the creator of the Disney XD original series Billy Dilley's Super-Duper Subterranean Summer, in which he voiced the main character, Billy Dilley. He is also known for his work on the Nickelodeon animated series SpongeBob SquarePants.

== Early life ==
Springer was a fan of animation from a very early age. Inspiration from his show Billy Dilley's Super-Duper Subterranean Summer was drawn from his childhood on a summer day typically when he stated Richard Scarry was his favorite types of illustrators what also drew inspiration from his own TV show. He grew up watching Charlie Brown and Rankin-Bass productions and a few other cartoons.

== Career ==
A graduate of the California Institute of the Arts, Springer began his career in animation working for Spümcø, later departing the company for Cartoon Network Studios. He was best known for creating pilots that were never picked up as full series, but have developed cult followings. Outside of his own work, Springer worked on a good amount of Cartoon Network series including Samurai Jack (2002–2003), Dexter's Laboratory (2003) and The Grim Adventures of Billy & Mandy (2005–2007). Springer would intermittently work at for Nickelodeon Animation Studio; he exclusively worked on SpongeBob SquarePants as a writer, storyboard artist and storyboard director for the first eight seasons, as well as co-writing and storyboarding its 2004 film adaptation.

His most recognizable pilot is Korgoth of Barbaria for Adult Swim in 2006, which was originally picked up for a full series (because of its critical and commercial success with garnering high ratings), however the decision was eventually passed up as the production costs would've been too expensive, so says later events, including a formal petition to revive the show.

Springer also created Periwinkle Around the World back in 2004 for Cartoon Network, that was divided into five separate two-minute shorts, produced and directed by Genndy Tartakovsky. This series of shorts followed an anthropomorphic platypus as he travels around a few places in the world, such as China and Italy. Tom Kenny voiced a majority of the characters. Refusing to pick it up as a full series, Cartoon Network instead planned to release five shorts from the pilot as mobile phone content, but ended up putting them in their Sunday Pants anthology series in 2005. Springer's last pilot for Cartoon Network was Baloobaloob's Fun Park in 2009, which was produced as part of The Cartoonstitute.

More recently, he had worked closely with Disney Television Animation, working on Gravity Falls (2012–2013), Wander Over Yonder (2014) and the Mickey Mouse (2013–2015) television series. At the studio, Springer created Billy Dilley's Super-Duper Subterranean Summer for Disney XD, where he voiced the main character, Billy Dilley. The show was first announced in 2014 as a potential pilot, alongside another potential pilot Very Important House. In March 2016, it was confirmed that Disney XD has greenlit Springer's show for a full series. It officially premiered on June 3, 2017, and ended 12 days later. In 2019, Pete Browngardt mentioned that Springer was at Warner Bros. Animation developing a new adult animated project under the name Snail Riders of Zongdar, however the project was passed up some time after the initial trailer pitch. In 2024, Springer returned to Paramount Animation to be a storyboard artist for The SpongeBob Movie: Search for SquarePants.

Aaron Springer's cartoons are notable for their inclusion of extended gags, anthropomorphism and off-model poses. Springer has cited Richard Scarry, Sergio Aragonés, Frank Frazetta, Vaughn Bodē, Akira Toriyama, Hideshi Hino, Shigeru Mizuki and Hugo Pratt as his influences.

== Filmography ==
=== Television ===
Year	Title	Role	Notes
1999–2012	SpongeBob SquarePants	Real-life drummer ("Pre-Hibernation Week" episode)	Writer (Seasons 1–8); Storyboard director (Seasons 1–8); Storyboard artist (Season 1); Director (Season 2)
1999	A Day in the Life of Ranger Smith		Layout artist
2001	A Kitty Bobo Show		Pilot; animation layout artist
2002	Poochini		Storyboard artist (2 episodes)
2001–2003	Samurai Jack		Writer/storyboard artist
2003	Dexter's Laboratory		Writer/storyboard artist
2004	Periwinkle Around the World		Miniseries for Sunday Pants; creator/writer/director/storyboard artist/layout artist/executive producer
2005–2007	The Grim Adventures of Billy & Mandy		Story/storyboard artist
2006	Korgoth of Barbaria		creator/writer/director/storyboard artist/character designer/executive producer
2009	The Cartoonstitute		creator/director/storyboard artist of “Baloobaloob’s Fun Park”
2012–2013	Gravity Falls		director (season 1)
2013–2015	Mickey Mouse	various	writer/director/storyboard artist
2014	Wander Over Yonder	additional voices	story/writer/director/storyboard artist ("The Helper")
2017	Billy Dilley's Super-Duper Subterranean Summer	Billy Dilley	Creator/executive producer/writer/storyboard artist
2021	Snail Riders of Zongdar		Creator/director/storyboard artist
2023	Looney Tunes Cartoons		Writer/storyboard artist/character designer ("Crumb and Get It")
2024	The Patrick Star Show		Writer/storyboard artist ("Too Many Patricks")
2025	Chibiverse	Billy Dilley	Voice ("Journey to the Center of the Chibiverse")

=== Film ===
Year	Title	Role	Notes
1997	A Sunday Stroll		Student films
1997	Baby's New Formula		Student films
1997	Cats Don't Dance		Intern artist (uncredited)
2003	Looney Tunes: Back in Action		Storyboard artist
2004	The SpongeBob SquarePants Movie	Laughing Bubble	Also writer, storyboard artist, character designer
2007	SpongeBob's Atlantis SquarePantis		Live-action segments only
2020	The SpongeBob Movie: Sponge on the Run		Head of story
2022	Trick or Treat Scooby-Doo!		Storyboard artist
2024	The Day the Earth Blew Up: A Looney Tunes Movie		Storyboard artist
2025	The SpongeBob Movie: Search for SquarePants	Scallop	Also supervising producer, storyboard artist

=== Music videos and Internet ===
Year	Title	Role	Notes
1997	Björk: I Miss You		storyboard/layout/animator
1997	Weekend Pussy Hunt		storyboard/layout
1997	What Pee Boners Are For		storyboard/layout
1997–1998	The Goddamn George Liquor Program		storyboard/layout/animator
