= Endless Summer =

Endless Summer or The Endless Summer may refer to:

== Places ==
- Universal's Endless Summer Resort, twin hotels at the Universal Orlando Resort featuring surf and coastal-themed decor

== Film and television ==
- The Endless Summer, a 1966 documentary film about surfers directed by Bruce Brown
  - The Endless Summer II, a 1994 sequel to the 1966 film
  - The Endless Summer Revisited, a 2000 documentary using cast-off footage from the Endless Summer films
- "Endless Summer!", a 1990 episode of The Raccoons
- The Endless Summer (SpongeBob SquarePants short), a short educational film in 2005 featuring SpongeBob SquarePants, about the effects of global warming
- "Endless Summer" (The Thundermans: Undercover), an episode of the American TV series The Thundermans: Undercover

== Music ==
=== Bands ===
- Endless Summer, Canadian duo also known as Same Same and Music Travel Love
- Endless Summer, production duo of Jonas Blue and Sam Feldt

=== Albums ===
- Endless Summer (Beach Boys album), 1974
- Endless Summer (Fennesz album), 2001
- Endless Summer (Jack River album), 2023
- The Endless Summer (G-Eazy mixtape), 2011
- Endless Summer (Sóley album), 2017
- Endless Summer: Greatest Hits, 1994 compilation album by Donna Summer
- Endless Summer Vacation, 2023 album by Miley Cyrus
- Endless Summer, 2016 album by the Midnight
- Endless Summer, 2023 album by the Elovaters

=== Songs ===
- "Endless Summer" (Oceana song), 2012
- "Endless Summer" (Scooter song), 1995
- "Endless Summer" (Siria song), 2004
- "Endless Summer", by Alan Walker and Zak Abel, 2023
- "Endless Summer", by the Jezabels, 2011
- "Endless Summer", by Jim Stark from Morning Songs
- "Endless Summer", by Raveena from Asha's Awakening, 2022
- "Endless Summer", by Still Corners, 2011
- "Endless Summer", by Superchunk, 2022

== Science ==
- A genetically modified tomato

== See also ==
- Eternal Summer
