= Morning Song =

Morning Song may refer to:

- "Morning Song" (song), a song by Jewel
- Morning Song (David Murray album)
- Morning Song (George Cables album)
- Morning Songs, a 2004 EP by Jim Stark

== See also ==
- Morning (disambiguation) § Songs
