= List of SpongeBob SquarePants episodes =

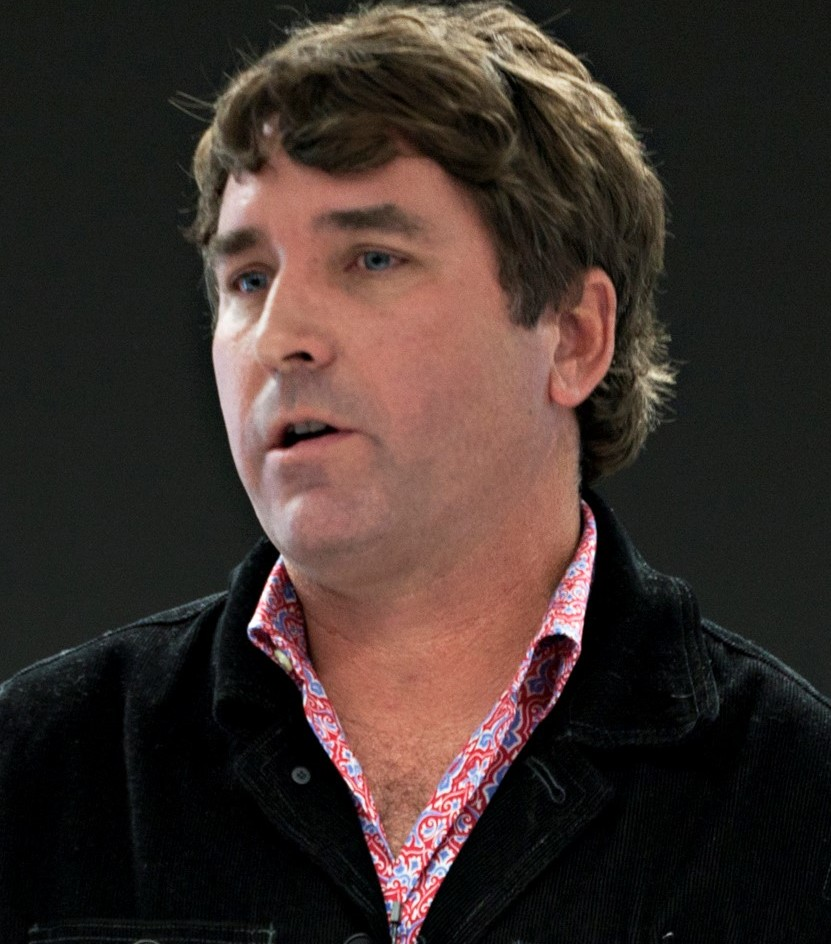
Stephen Hillenburg, shown here in 2011, created SpongeBob SquarePants, which premiered on May 1, 1999.

SpongeBob SquarePants is an American animated television series created by marine biologist and animator Stephen Hillenburg that premiered on Nickelodeon on May 1, 1999. The series is set in the fictional underwater city of Bikini Bottom, and centers on the adventures and endeavors of SpongeBob SquarePants, an enthusiastic and optimistic sea sponge. Many of the ideas for the show originated in an unpublished, educational comic book titled The Intertidal Zone, which Hillenburg created in the mid-1980s. He began developing SpongeBob SquarePants into a television series in 1996 after the cancellation of Rocko's Modern Life, another Nickelodeon television series that Hillenburg previously directed.

As of November 20, 2026, 345 episodes of SpongeBob SquarePants have aired, concluding the seventeenth season. The seventeenth season premiered on June 12, 2026. On June 9, 2026, the series was renewed for an eighteenth and nineteenth season.

Six theatrical and streaming films have been released as of 2025, including The SpongeBob SquarePants Movie (2004), The SpongeBob Movie: Sponge Out of Water (2015), The SpongeBob Movie: Sponge on the Run (2020), Saving Bikini Bottom: The Sandy Cheeks Movie (2024), Plankton: The Movie (2025), and The SpongeBob Movie: Search for SquarePants (2025).

Atlantis SquarePantis, a television film guest starring David Bowie, debuted as part of the fifth season. In 2009, Nickelodeon celebrated the show's tenth anniversary with Square Roots: The Story of SpongeBob SquarePants and SpongeBob's Truth or Square. In 2019, Nickelodeon celebrated the show's twentieth anniversary with SpongeBob's Big Birthday Blowout, a television film.

Episodes of SpongeBob SquarePants have been nominated for a variety of different awards, including 17 Annie Awards (with six wins), 17 Golden Reel Awards (with eight wins), 15 Emmy Awards (with one win), 23 Kids' Choice Awards (with 22 wins), and four BAFTA Children's Awards (with two wins). Several compilation DVDs have been released. In addition, the first fifteen seasons have been released on DVD, and are available for Regions 1, 2 and 4 as of November 11, 2025.

== Series overview ==
Season	Episodes		Segments	Originally released		Avg. viewers (millions)
Season	Episodes		Segments	First released	Last released	Avg. viewers (millions)
1	20		41	May 1, 1999	March 3, 2001	2.65
2	20		39	October 20, 2000	July 26, 2003	2.88
3	20		37	October 5, 2001	October 11, 2004	4.42
4	20		38	May 6, 2005	July 24, 2007	3.86
5	20		41	February 19, 2007	July 19, 2009	4.11
6	26		47	March 3, 2008	July 5, 2010	4.09
7	26		50	July 19, 2009	June 11, 2011	4.54
8	26		47	March 26, 2011	December 6, 2012	3.26
9	26	11	20	July 21, 2012	March 29, 2015	2.79
9	26	15	29	July 16, 2015	February 20, 2017	2.79
10	11		22	October 15, 2016	December 2, 2017	1.95
11	26		50	June 24, 2017	November 25, 2018	1.54
12	26		48	November 11, 2018	April 29, 2022	0.95
13	26		52	October 22, 2020	November 1, 2023	0.31
14	13 (Note: The second half of the season was split into a fifteenth season, bringing the number of episodes to 13.)		21	November 2, 2023	December 2, 2024	0.17
15	13		26	July 24, 2024	June 20, 2025	TBA
16	13		22	June 27, 2025	June 5, 2026	TBA
17	13		26	June 12, 2026	November 20, 2026	TBA

== Films ==
Title	Directed by	Written and storyboarded by	Release date
Main series
The SpongeBob SquarePants Movie	Stephen Hillenburg	Derek Drymon, Tim Hill, Stephen Hillenburg, Kent Osborne, Aaron Springer, and Paul Tibbitt	November 19, 2004 (U.S.); November 14, 2004 (international)
The SpongeBob Movie: Sponge Out of Water	Paul Tibbitt	Story by : Stephen Hillenburg and Paul Tibbitt; Screenplay by : Jonathan Aibel and Glenn Berger; Storyboarded by : Luke Brookshier, Mike Cachuela, Marc Ceccarelli, Emma Coats, Joel Crawford, Nick Cross, Heiko Drengenberg, Bob Flynn, Matt Flynn, Dalton Grant Jr., Elizabeth Ito, Tom King, Jay Oliva, Howie Perry, Chris Reccardi, Johnny Ryan, David P. Smith, Eddie Trigueros, and Carson Kuglar	February 6, 2015 (U.S.); January 28, 2015 (international)
The SpongeBob Movie: Sponge on the Run	Tim Hill	Story by : Tim Hill, Jonathan Aibel, and Glenn Berger; Screenplay by : Tim Hill; Storyboarded by : Zeus Cervas, Charlotte Jackson, Charles Klein, Kenny Pittenger, Chris Reccardi, Jason Reicher, Josh Engel, Brian Morante, Fred Osmond, John Trabbic, and Josh Zinman	August 14, 2020 (Canada); November 5, 2020 (international); March 4, 2021 (U.S.)
The SpongeBob Movie: Search for SquarePants	Derek Drymon	Story by : Pam Brady, Kaz, and Andrew Goodman; Screenplay by : Pam Brady and Matt Lieberman; Storyboarded by : Aaron Springer, Erik Wiese, David Feiss, Scott Underwood, Mark Ackland, Jason Reicher, Josh Engel, Anthony Jensen, Lewie Kerr, Paul McEvoy, Piero Piluso, Josh Lieberman, Rob Porter, Rikke Asbjoern & Jamila Koch	December 19, 2025 (U.S.); December 17, 2025 (international)
Spin-off series
Saving Bikini Bottom: The Sandy Cheeks Movie	Liza Johnson	Story by : Kaz; Screenplay by : Kaz and Tom Stern; Storyboarded by : Chuck Klein, Jason Dorf, Mark Stanleigh, Steven E. Gordon, Brian Mann, Maddie Taylor, Brian Hatfield, Katie Smith, Dylan Bozic, Eliza Herndon, and Joey Mason	August 2, 2024 (worldwide)
Plankton: The Movie	Dave Needham	Story by : Mr. Lawrence; Screenplay by : Kaz, Chris Viscardi, and Mr. Lawrence; Storyboarded by : Chuck Klein, Casey Alexander, Benjamin Arcand, Jason Reicher, Clayton Morrow, Luke Allen, Joshua Engel, Delia Gosman, Katie Smith & Thomas Wellmann	March 7, 2025 (worldwide)
