= Eternal Summer =

Eternal Summer may refer to:

- Eternal Summer (2006 film), a Taiwanese film directed by Leste Chen
  - Eternal Summer (soundtrack), soundtrack of the film
- Eternal Summer (2015 film), a Swedish film directed by Andreas Öhman
- "Eternal Summer", a song by The Strokes from their 2020 album The New Abnormal

== See also ==
- Endless Summer (disambiguation)
