= Jim Stärk =

Norwegian pop band

- Origin: Oslo
- Genres: Pop music
- Years active: 2002–present
- Labels: BP, Sweet, Universal Music Group
- Members: Einar Stokke Fadnes; Inge Sørbrøden
- Past members: Simen Mæhlum Asbjørn Ribe Tom Rudi Torjussen
- Website: www.jimstark.no

Jim Stärk is a Norwegian band whose records have met with some success in its native land as well as abroad, especially the EP Morning Songs, which topped the Norwegian charts. The band name is derived from James Dean's character in the film Rebel Without a Cause.

== Discography ==
Albums

- Ten Songs and Hey Hey (BP 2002)
- No Time Wasted (Sweet Recordings 2003)
- Ten Songs and Hey Hey, No Time Wasted (Sweet Recordings 2003) Double album, vinyl
- Jim Stärk (Sweet Recordings 2005)
- Turn Around and Look (Sweet Recordings 2006)
- Rainy Love Sounds (Sweet Recordings 2011)

EPs

- Morning Songs (Sweet Recordings 2004)

Singles

- "You're the One That I Want" feat. Claudia Scott (BP 2003)
- "It's All Right" (Sweet Recordings/Universal 2006)
- "True Story" (Sweet Recordings/Universal 2011)
