= List of SpongeBob SquarePants episodes (seasons 1–10) =

Episode list for an animated series

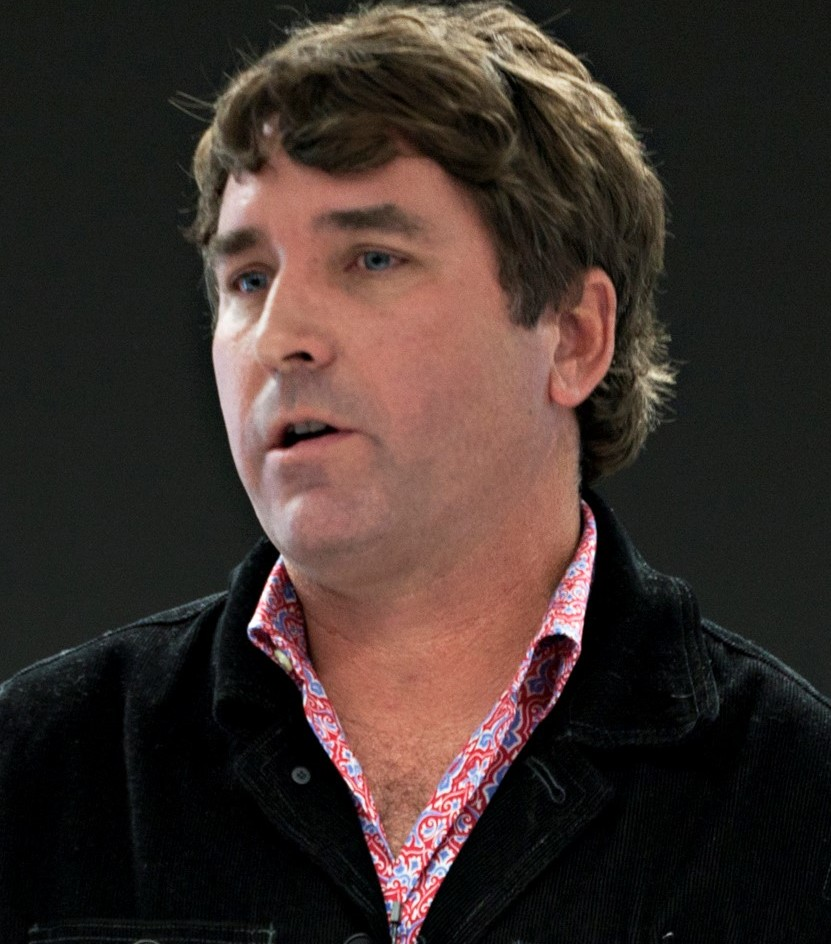
Stephen Hillenburg, shown here in 2011, created SpongeBob SquarePants, which premiered on May 1, 1999.

SpongeBob SquarePants is an American animated television series created by marine biologist and animator Stephen Hillenburg that premiered on Nickelodeon on May 1, 1999. The series is set in the fictional underwater city of Bikini Bottom, and centers on the adventures and endeavors of SpongeBob SquarePants, an enthusiastic and optimistic sea sponge. Many of the ideas for the show originated in an unpublished, educational comic book titled The Intertidal Zone, which Hillenburg created in the mid-1980s. He began developing SpongeBob SquarePants into a television series in 1996 after the cancellation of Rocko's Modern Life, another Nickelodeon television series that Hillenburg previously directed.

As of November 13, 2026, 344 episodes of SpongeBob SquarePants have aired, currently in its seventeenth season. The seventeenth season premiered on June 12, 2026. On June 9, 2026, the series was renewed for an eighteenth and nineteenth season.

Six theatrical and streaming films have been released as of 2025, including The SpongeBob SquarePants Movie (2004), The SpongeBob Movie: Sponge Out of Water (2015), The SpongeBob Movie: Sponge on the Run (2020), Saving Bikini Bottom: The Sandy Cheeks Movie (2024), Plankton: The Movie (2025), and The SpongeBob Movie: Search for SquarePants (2025).

Atlantis SquarePantis, a television film guest starring David Bowie, debuted as part of the fifth season. In 2009, Nickelodeon celebrated the show's tenth anniversary with Square Roots: The Story of SpongeBob SquarePants and SpongeBob's Truth or Square. In 2019, Nickelodeon celebrated the show's twentieth anniversary with SpongeBob's Big Birthday Blowout, a television film.

Episodes of SpongeBob SquarePants have been nominated for a variety of different awards, including 17 Annie Awards (with six wins), 17 Golden Reel Awards (with eight wins), 15 Emmy Awards (with one win), 23 Kids' Choice Awards (with 22 wins), and four BAFTA Children's Awards (with two wins). Several compilation DVDs have been released. In addition, the first fifteen seasons have been released on DVD, and are available for Regions 1, 2 and 4 as of November 11, 2025.

== Series overview ==
Season	Episodes		Segments	Originally released		Avg. viewers (millions)
Season	Episodes		Segments	First released	Last released	Avg. viewers (millions)
1	20		41	May 1, 1999	March 3, 2001	2.65
2	20		39	October 20, 2000	July 26, 2003	2.88
3	20		37	October 5, 2001	October 11, 2004	4.42
4	20		38	May 6, 2005	July 24, 2007	3.86
5	20		41	February 19, 2007	July 19, 2009	4.11
6	26		47	March 3, 2008	July 5, 2010	4.09
7	26		50	July 19, 2009	June 11, 2011	4.54
8	26		47	March 26, 2011	December 6, 2012	3.26
9	26	11	20	July 21, 2012	March 29, 2015	2.79
9	26	15	29	July 16, 2015	February 20, 2017	2.79
10	11		22	October 15, 2016	December 2, 2017	1.95
11	26		50	June 24, 2017	November 25, 2018	1.54
12	26		48	November 11, 2018	April 29, 2022	0.95
13	26		52	October 22, 2020	November 1, 2023	0.31
14	13 (Note: The second half of the season was split into a fifteenth season, bringing the number of episodes to 13.)		21	November 2, 2023	December 2, 2024	0.17
15	13		26	July 24, 2024	June 20, 2025	TBA
16	13		22	June 27, 2025	June 5, 2026	TBA
17	TBA		TBA	June 12, 2026	TBA	TBA

== Episodes ==
=== Season 1 (1999–2001) ===
The first season of SpongeBob SquarePants consists of 20 episodes (41 segments, since the first episode has three segments). This is the only season that used cel animation.

No. overall	No. in season	Title	Animation direction by (Note: Information is taken from the opening credits of each episode.)	Written by	Original release date	Prod. code	U.S. viewers (millions)
1	1	"Help Wanted"	Alan Smart	Written by : Stephen Hillenburg, Derek Drymon, & Tim Hill; Storyboarded by : Derek Drymon; Stephen Hillenburg (director)	May 1, 1999	PILOT (1997 version); 2515–127 (1999 version)	2.96 2.14 (HH) (Note: (HH) denotes the amount of households that an episode was viewed in on premiere.)
1	1	"Reef Blower"	Fred Miller & Tom Yasumi	Written by : Stephen Hillenburg, Derek Drymon, & Tim Hill; Storyboarded by : Jay Lender; Paul Tibbitt (director)	May 1, 1999	2515–126	2.96 2.14 (HH)
1	1	"Tea at the Treedome"	Edgar Larrazabal; Tom Yasumi (Note: Later reruns, The Complete 1st Season DVD, The First 100 Episodes DVD, and 10 Happiest Moments DVD versions.)	Written by : Peter Burns, Mr. Lawrence, & Paul Tibbitt; Storyboarded by : Mark O'Hare; Paul Tibbitt (director)	May 1, 1999	2515–101	2.96 2.14 (HH)
2	2	"Bubblestand"	Tom Yasumi	Written by : Ennio Torresan, Erik Wiese, Stephen Hillenburg, Derek Drymon & Tim Hill; Storyboarded by : Erik Wiese; Ennio Torresan (director)	July 17, 1999	2515–105	2.51 (Note: This episode also received 1.9 million viewers with children aged 2 through 11.)
2	2	"Ripped Pants"	Edgar Larrazabal	Written by : Paul Tibbitt & Peter Burns; Storyboarded by : Mark O'Hare; Paul Tibbitt (director)	July 17, 1999	2515–106	2.51
3	3	"Jellyfishing"	Alan Smart	Written by : Steve Fonti, Chris Mitchell, Peter Burns & Tim Hill; Storyboarded by : Chris Mitchell; Steve Fonti (director)	July 31, 1999	2515–103	2.89 2.24 (HH)
3	3	"Plankton!"	Edgar Larrazabal	Written by : Ennio Torresan, Erik Wiese & Mr. Lawrence; Storyboarded by : Erik Wiese; Ennio Torresan (director)	July 31, 1999	2515–114	2.89 2.24 (HH)
4	4	"Naughty Nautical Neighbors"	Fred Miller	Written by : Sherm Cohen, Aaron Springer & Mr. Lawrence; Storyboarded by : Aaron Springer; Sherm Cohen (director)	August 7, 1999	2515–116	2.83 2.07 (HH)
4	4	"Boating School"	Tom Yasumi	Written by : Ennio Torresan Jr., Erik Wiese & Mr. Lawrence; Storyboarded by : Erik Wiese; Ennio Torresan Jr. (director)	August 7, 1999	2515–104	2.83 2.07 (HH)
5	5	"Pizza Delivery"	Sean Dempsey	Written by : Sherm Cohen, Aaron Springer & Peter Burns; Storyboarded by : Aaron Springer; Sherm Cohen (director)	August 14, 1999	2515–107	2.47
5	5	"Home Sweet Pineapple"	Tom Yasumi	Written by : Ennio Torresan Jr., Erik Wiese & Mr. Lawrence; Storyboarded by : Erik Wiese; Ennio Torresan Jr. (director)	August 14, 1999	2515–124	2.47
6	6	"Mermaid Man and Barnacle Boy"	Sean Dempsey	Written by : Paul Tibbitt, Mark O'Hare & Mr. Lawrence; Storyboarded by : Mark O'Hare; Paul Tibbitt (director)	August 21, 1999	2515–119	2.94 2.17 (HH)
6	6	"Pickles"	Tom Yasumi	Written by : Steve Fonti, Chris Mitchell & Peter Burns; Storyboarded by : Chris Mitchell & Jay Lender; Steve Fonti (director)	August 21, 1999	2515–111	2.94 2.17 (HH)
7	7	"Hall Monitor"	Edgar Larrazabal	Written by : Chuck Klein, Jay Lender & Mr. Lawrence; Storyboarded by : Jay Lender; Chuck Klein (director)	August 28, 1999	2515–108	3.08 2.12 (HH)
7	7	"Jellyfish Jam"	Fred Miller	Written by : Ennio Torresan, Jr., Erik Wiese & Peter Burns; Storyboarded by : Erik Wiese; Ennio Torresan, Jr. (director)	August 28, 1999	2515–118	3.08 2.12 (HH)
8	8	"Sandy's Rocket"	Tom Yasumi	Written by : Sherm Cohen, Aaron Springer & Peter Burns; Storyboarded by : Aaron Springer; Sherm Cohen (director)	September 17, 1999	2515–110	2.40
8	8	"Squeaky Boots"	Fred Miller	Written by : Steve Fonti, Chris Mitchell & Mr. Lawrence; Storyboarded by : Chris Mitchell; Steve Fonti (director)	September 17, 1999	2515–102	2.40
9	9	"Nature Pants"	Sean Dempsey	Written by : Paul Tibbitt, Mark O'Hare & Peter Burns; Storyboarded by : Mark O'Hare; Paul Tibbitt (director)	September 11, 1999	2515–120	2.54
9	9	"Opposite Day"	Tom Yasumi	Written by : Chuck Klein, Jay Lender & Mr. Lawrence; Storyboarded by : Jay Lender; Chuck Klein (director)	September 11, 1999	2515–112	2.54
10	10	"Culture Shock"	Edgar Larrazabal	Written by : Paul Tibbitt, Mark O'Hare & Mr. Lawrence; Storyboarded by : Mark O'Hare; Paul Tibbitt (director)	September 18, 1999	2515–122	2.41
10	10	"F.U.N."	Fred Miller	Written by : Sherm Cohen, Aaron Springer & Peter Burns; Storyboarded by : Aaron Springer; Sherm Cohen (director)	September 18, 1999	2515–121	2.41
11	11	"MuscleBob BuffPants"	Edgar Larrazabal	Written by : Ennio Torresan, Jr., Erik Wiese & Mr. Lawrence; Storyboarded by : Erik Wiese; Ennio Torresan, Jr. (director)	October 2, 1999	2515–123	2.61
11	11	"Squidward the Unfriendly Ghost"	Fred Miller	Written by : Sherm Cohen, Aaron Springer & Peter Burns; Storyboarded by : Aaron Springer; Sherm Cohen (director)	October 2, 1999	2515–115	2.61
12	12	"The Chaperone"	Sean Dempsey	Written by : Sherm Cohen, Aaron Springer & Peter Burns; Storyboarded by : Aaron Springer; Sherm Cohen (director)	March 8, 2000	2515–113	3.23
12	12	"Employee of the Month"	Sean Dempsey	Written by : Paul Tibbitt & Mr. Lawrence; Storyboarded by : Mark O'Hare, Ennio Torresan Jr. & Erik Wiese; Paul Tibbitt (director)	March 8, 2000	2515–125	3.23
13	13	"Scaredy Pants"	Sean Dempsey	Written by : Paul Tibbitt & Peter Burns; Storyboarded by : Mark O'Hare; Paul Tibbitt (director)	October 28, 1999	2515–109	2.68
13	13	"I Was a Teenage Gary"	Edgar Larrazabal	Written by : Steve Fonti, Chris Mitchell & Mr. Lawrence; Storyboarded by : Chris Mitchell; Steve Fonti (director)	October 28, 1999	2515–117	2.68
14	14	"SB-129"	Tom Yasumi	Written by : Aaron Springer, Erik Wiese & Mr. Lawrence; Storyboarded by : Erik Wiese; Aaron Springer (director)	December 31, 1999	2515–129	1.52
14	14	"Karate Choppers"	Tom Yasumi	Written by : Aaron Springer, Erik Wiese & Merriwether Williams; Storyboarded by : Erik Wiese; Aaron Springer (director)	December 31, 1999	2515–135	1.52
15	15	"Sleepy Time"	Edgar Larrazabal	Written by : Paul Tibbitt, Ennio Torresan Jr. & Mr. Lawrence; Storyboarded by : Paul Tibbitt & Ennio Torresan Jr. (also directors)	January 17, 2000	2515–141	2.89
15	15	"Suds"	Edgar Larrazabal	Written by : Paul Tibbitt, Ennio Torresan Jr. & Mr. Lawrence; Storyboarded by : Paul Tibbitt & Ennio Torresan Jr. (also directors)	January 17, 2000	2515–132	2.89
16	16	"Valentine's Day"	Fred Miller	Written by : Chuck Klein, Jay Lender & Merriwether Williams; Storyboarded by : Jay Lender; Chuck Klein (director)	February 14, 2000	2515–128	2.75
16	16	"The Paper"	Fred Miller	Written by : Chuck Klein, Jay Lender & Mr. Lawrence; Storyboarded by : Jay Lender; Chuck Klein (director)	February 14, 2000	2515–134	2.75
17	17	"Arrgh!"	Sean Dempsey	Written by : Sherm Cohen, Vincent Waller & Merriwether Williams; Storyboarded by : Vincent Waller; Sherm Cohen (director)	March 15, 2000	2515–130	3.08 2.14 (HH)
17	17	"Rock Bottom"	Tom Yasumi	Written by : Paul Tibbitt, Ennio Torresan & David Fain; Storyboarded by : Paul Tibbitt & Ennio Torresan (also directors)	March 15, 2000	2515–138	3.08 2.14 (HH)
18	18	"Texas"	Sean Dempsey	Written by : Sherm Cohen, Vincent Waller & David Fain; Storyboarded by : Vincent Waller; Sherm Cohen (director)	March 22, 2000	2515–139	3.10 2.11 (HH)
18	18	"Walking Small"	Sean Dempsey	Written by : Aaron Springer, Erik Wiese & Mr. Lawrence; Storyboarded by : Erik Wiese; Aaron Springer (director)	March 22, 2000	2515–133	3.10 2.11 (HH)
19	19	"Fools in April"	Fred Miller	Written by : Aaron Springer, Erik Wiese & Merriwether Williams; Storyboarded by : Erik Wiese; Aaron Springer (director)	April 1, 2000	2515–140	1.78
19	19	"Neptune's Spatula"	Fred Miller	Written by : Chuck Klein, Jay Lender & David B. Fain; Storyboarded by : Jay Lender; Chuck Klein (director)	April 1, 2000	2515–137	1.78
20	20	"Hooky"	Edgar Larrazabal	Written by : Sherm Cohen, Vincent Waller & Merriwether Williams; Storyboarded by : Vincent Waller; Sherm Cohen (director)	February 23, 2001	2515–136	2.17
20	20	"Mermaid Man and Barnacle Boy II"	Tom Yasumi	Written by : Chuck Klein, Jay Lender & Mr. Lawrence; Storyboarded by : Jay Lender; Chuck Klein (director)	March 3, 2001	2515–131	2.54

=== Season 2 (2000–03) ===
The second season of SpongeBob SquarePants consists of 20 episodes (39 segments), which are ordered below by packaging number and not their original broadcast order.

No. overall	No. in season	Title	Animation direction by	Written by	Original release date	Prod. code	U.S. viewers (millions)
21	1	"Your Shoe's Untied"	Tom Yasumi	Written by : Walt Dohrn, Paul Tibbitt & Merriwether Williams; Storyboarded by : Chris Headrick & Erik Wiese (also directors)	February 17, 2001	5571–142	2.75 1.84 (HH)
21	1	"Squid's Day Off"	Andrew Overtoom	Written by : Walt Dohrn, Paul Tibbitt & Merriwether Williams; Storyboarded by : Jim Schumann (also director)	February 17, 2001	5571–145	2.75 1.84 (HH)
22	2	"Something Smells"	Edgar Larrazabal	Written by : Aaron Springer, C.H. Greenblatt & Merriwether Williams; Storyboarded by : C.H. Greenblatt; Aaron Springer (director)	October 20, 2000	5571–143	2.27
22	2	"Bossy Boots"	Tom Yasumi	Written by : Walt Dohrn, Paul Tibbitt & Mr. Lawrence; Storyboarded by : Chris Headrick (also director)	October 20, 2000	5571–146	2.27
23	3	"Big Pink Loser"	Sean Dempsey	Written by : Jay Lender, William Reiss & Merriwether Williams; Storyboarded by : William Reiss; Jay Lender (director)	February 3, 2001	5571–144	2.80
23	3	"Bubble Buddy"	Sean Dempsey	Written by : Jay Lender, William Reiss & Mr. Lawrence; Storyboarded by : William Reiss & Chuck Klein; Jay Lender (director)	February 3, 2001	5571–148	2.80
24	4	"Dying for Pie"	Edgar Larrazabal	Written by : Aaron Springer, C.H. Greenblatt & Merriwether Williams; Storyboarded by : C.H. Greenblatt & Erik Wiese; Aaron Springer (director)	January 27, 2001	5571–147	3.43 2.42 (HH)
24	4	"Imitation Krabs"	Tom Yasumi	Written by : Walt Dohrn, Paul Tibbitt & Mr. Lawrence; Storyboarded by : Chris Headrick & Chuck Klein (also directors)	January 27, 2001	5571–150	3.43 2.42 (HH)
25	5	"Wormy"	Andrew Overtoom	Written by : Walt Dohrn, Paul Tibbitt & Merriwether Williams; Storyboarded by : Jim Schumann (also director)	February 24, 2001	5571–149	2.69
25	5	"Patty Hype"	Sean Dempsey	Written by : Jay Lender, William Reiss & Mr. Lawrence; Storyboarded by : William Reiss; Jay Lender (director)	February 24, 2001	5571–152	2.69
26	6	"Grandma's Kisses"	Andrew Overtoom	Written by : Walt Dohrn, Paul Tibbitt & Merriwether Williams; Storyboarded by : Jim Schumann & Octavio Rodriguez (also directors)	April 28, 2001	5571–154	2.09 1.43 (HH)
26	6	"Squidville"	Edgar Larrazabal	Written by : Aaron Springer, C.H. Greenblatt & Merriwether Williams; Storyboarded by : C.H. Greenblatt; Aaron Springer (director)	April 28, 2001	5571–156	2.09 1.43 (HH)
27	7	"Prehibernation Week"	Edgar Larrazabal	Written by : Aaron Springer, C.H. Greenblatt & Merriwether Williams; Storyboarded by : C.H. Greenblatt; Aaron Springer (director)	May 5, 2001	5571–151	2.13 1.44 (HH)
27	7	"Life of Crime"	Sean Dempsey	Written by : Jay Lender, William Reiss & Mr. Lawrence; Storyboarded by : William Reiss; Jay Lender (director)	May 5, 2001	5571–157	2.13 1.44 (HH)
28	8	"Christmas Who?" "Patchy the Pirate Presents the SpongeBob SquarePants Christmas Special"	Tom Yasumi	Written by : Walt Dohrn, Paul Tibbitt & Mr. Lawrence; Storyboarded by : Chris Headrick & Erik Wiese (also directors)	December 7, 2000	5571–155 5571–153	2.17
29	9	"Survival of the Idiots"	Larry Leichliter	Written by : Aaron Springer, C.H. Greenblatt & Merriwether Williams; Storyboarded by : C.H. Greenblatt	March 17, 2001	5571–160	2.81
29	9	"Dumped"	Andrew Overtoom	Written by : Paul Tibbitt, Walt Dohrn & Merriwether Williams; Storyboarded by : Caleb Meurer; Carson Kugler (director)	May 11, 2001	5571–161	2.24
30	10	"No Free Rides"	Tom Yasumi	Written by : Aaron Springer, C.H. Greenblatt & Mr. Lawrence; Storyboarded by : C.H. Greenblatt	April 14, 2001	5571–162	2.27
30	10	"I'm Your Biggest Fanatic"	Sean Dempsey	Written by : Jay Lender, William Reiss & Mr. Lawrence; Storyboarded by : William Reiss; Jay Lender (director)	April 14, 2001	5571–159	2.27
31	11	"Mermaid Man and Barnacle Boy III"	Andrew Overtoom	Written by : Paul Tibbitt, Walt Dohrn & Merriwether Williams; Storyboarded by : Erik Wiese (also director)	September 14, 2001	5571–158	3.07
31	11	"Squirrel Jokes"	Larry Leichliter & Leonard Robinson	Written by : Paul Tibbitt, Walt Dohrn & Merriwether Williams; Storyboarded by : Chris Headrick (also director)	September 14, 2001	5571–164	3.07
32	12	"Pressure"	Sean Dempsey	Written by : Jay Lender, William Reiss & David Fain; Storyboarded by : William Reiss; Jay Lender (director)	May 12, 2001	5571–166	2.36 1.65 (HH)
32	12	"The Smoking Peanut"	Andrew Overtoom	Written by : Paul Tibbitt, Walt Dohrn & Mr. Lawrence; Storyboarded by : Carson Kugler (also director)	May 12, 2001	5571–163	2.36 1.65 (HH)
33 (Note: "Shanghaied" was alternatively listed under the syndication number #999 when it originally aired as part of a half-hour special event.)	13	"Shanghaied"	Frank Weiss	Written by : Aaron Springer, C.H. Greenblatt & Merriwether Williams; Storyboarded by : C.H. Greenblatt	March 9, 2001 (Extended "You Wish" Special); March 10, 2001 (Normal 15-Minute Episode)	5571–165	3.09 1.95 (HH)
33	13	"Gary Takes a Bath"	Frank Weiss	Written by : Aaron Springer, C.H. Greenblatt & Merriwether Williams; Storyboarded by : C.H. Greenblatt; Aaron Springer (director)	July 26, 2003 (Note: This episode was first released on the Sea Stories VHS/DVD on November 5, 2002.)	5571–183	2.96
34	14	"Welcome to the Chum Bucket"	Andrew Overtoom	Written by : Walt Dohrn, Paul Tibbitt & Mr. Lawrence; Storyboarded by : Carson Kugler, Erik Wiese & William Reiss; Walt Dohrn & Paul Tibbitt (directors)	January 21, 2002	5571–167	5.25 3.08 (HH)
34	14	"Frankendoodle"	Tom Yasumi	Written by : Walt Dohrn, Paul Tibbitt & Merriwether Williams; Storyboarded by : Chris Headrick (also director)	January 21, 2002	5571–169	5.25 3.08 (HH)
35	15	"The Secret Box"	Tom Yasumi	Written by : Walt Dohrn, Paul Tibbitt & Merriwether Williams; Storyboarded by : Carson Kugler, William Reiss & Erik Wiese; Walt Dohrn & Paul Tibbitt (directors)	September 7, 2001	5571–168	2.96
35	15	"Band Geeks"	Frank Weiss	Written by : Aaron Springer, C.H. Greenblatt & Merriwether Williams; Storyboarded by : C.H. Greenblatt	September 7, 2001	5571–173	2.96
36	16	"Graveyard Shift"	Sean Dempsey	Written by : Mr. Lawrence, Jay Lender & Dan Povenmire; Storyboarded by : Jay Lender & Dan Povenmire (also directors)	September 6, 2002 (Note: Graveyard Shift was first released in Nautical Nonsense VHS and Nautical Nonsense and Sponge Buddies DVD on March 12, 2002.)	5571–176	3.70 2.48 (HH)
36	16	"Krusty Love"	Sean Dempsey	Written by : Mr. Lawrence, Jay Lender & William Reiss; Storyboarded by : William Reiss; Jay Lender (director)	September 6, 2002	5571–170	3.70 2.48 (HH)
37	17	"Procrastination"	Tom Yasumi	Written by : Walt Dohrn, Paul Tibbitt & Mr. Lawrence; Storyboarded by : Carson Kugler, William Reiss & Erik Wiese; Walt Dohrn & Paul Tibbitt (directors)	October 19, 2001	5571–175	3.89
37	17	"I'm with Stupid"	Frank Weiss	Written by : C.H. Greenblatt, Aaron Springer & Mark O'Hare; Storyboarded by : C.H. Greenblatt; Aaron Springer (director)	October 19, 2001	5571–179	3.89
38	18	"Sailor Mouth"	Andrew Overtoom	Written by : Walt Dohrn, Paul Tibbitt & Merriwether Williams; Storyboarded by : Carson Kugler, William Reiss & Erik Wiese; Walt Dohrn & Paul Tibbitt (directors)	September 21, 2001	5571–182	2.88
38	18	"Artist Unknown"	Sean Dempsey	Written by : Walt Dohrn, Paul Tibbitt & Mark O'Hare; Storyboarded by : Carson Kugler, William Reiss & Erik Wiese; Walt Dohrn & Paul Tibbitt (directors)	September 21, 2001	5571–174	2.88
39	19	"Jellyfish Hunter"	Andrew Overtoom	Written by : Walt Dohrn, Paul Tibbitt & Mark O'Hare; Storyboarded by : Carson Kugler, William Reiss & Erik Wiese; Walt Dohrn & Paul Tibbitt (directors)	September 28, 2001	5571–181	2.54
39	19	"The Fry Cook Games"	Tom Yasumi	Written by : Dan Povenmire, Jay Lender & Merriwether Williams; Storyboarded by : Jay Lender & Dan Povenmire (also directors)	September 28, 2001	5571–171	2.54
40	20	"Squid on Strike"	Tom Yasumi	Written by : Walt Dohrn, Paul Tibbitt & Mark O'Hare; Storyboarded by : Carson Kugler, William Reiss & Erik Wiese; Walt Dohrn & Paul Tibbitt (directors)	October 12, 2001	5571–185	2.52
40	20	"Sandy, SpongeBob, and the Worm"	Sean Dempsey	Written by : Jay Lender, Dan Povenmire & Merriwether Williams; Storyboarded by : Jay Lender and Dan Povenmire (also directors)	October 12, 2001	5571–180	2.52

=== Season 3 (2001–04) ===
The third season of SpongeBob SquarePants consists of 20 episodes (37 segments), which are ordered below by packaging number and not their original broadcast order.

No. overall	No. in season	Title	Animation direction by	Written by	Original release date	Prod. code	U.S. viewers (millions)
41	1	"The Algae's Always Greener"	Frank Weiss	Written by : Aaron Springer, C.H. Greenblatt, and Merriwether Williams; Storyboarded by : Aaron Springer (director), C.H. Greenblatt	March 22, 2002	5572–188	4.55 2.64 (HH)
41	1	"SpongeGuard on Duty"	Sean Dempsey	Written by : Jay Lender, Sam Henderson, and Mark O'Hare; Storyboarded by : Jay Lender & Sam Henderson (directors), Caleb Meurer	March 22, 2002	5572–187	4.55 2.64 (HH)
42	2	"Club SpongeBob"	Andrew Overtoom	Written by : Walt Dohrn and Mark O'Hare; Storyboarded by : Walt Dohrn & Mark O'Hare (directors), Carson Kugler, William Reiss, & Erik Wiese	July 12, 2002 (Note: Club SpongeBob was first released on Sponge Buddies VHS and Nautical Nonsense and Sponge Buddies DVD on March 12, 2002.)	5572–192	2.52
42	2	"My Pretty Seahorse"	Tom Yasumi	Written by : Kent Osborne and Paul Tibbitt; Storyboarded by : Kent Osborne and Paul Tibbitt (directors), Carson Kugler, William Reiss, & Mike Roth	July 12, 2002	5572–193	2.52
43	3	"Just One Bite"	Sean Dempsey	Written by : Jay Lender, Sam Henderson, and Merriwether Williams; Storyboarded by : Jay Lender & Sam Henderson (directors), Caleb Meurer	October 5, 2001	5572–194	2.92
43	3	"The Bully"	Frank Weiss	Written by : Aaron Springer, C.H. Greenblatt, and Merriwether Williams; Storyboarded by : Aaron Springer (director), C.H. Greenblatt	October 5, 2001	5572–191	2.92
44	4	"Nasty Patty"	Tom Yasumi	Written by : Paul Tibbitt, Kaz, and Mark O'Hare; Storyboarded by : Paul Tibbitt & Kaz (directors), Carson Kugler, William Reiss, & Mike Roth	March 1, 2002	5572–195	3.91 2.65 (HH)
44	4	"Idiot Box"	Andrew Overtoom	Written by : Paul Tibbitt, Kent Osborne, and Merriwether Williams; Storyboarded by : Paul Tibbitt & Kent Osborne (directors), Carson Kugler, William Reiss, & Mike Roth	March 1, 2002	5572–178	3.91 2.65 (HH)
45	5	"Mermaid Man and Barnacle Boy IV"	Sean Dempsey	Written by : Jay Lender, Sam Henderson, and Merriwether Williams; Storyboarded by : Jay Lender & Sam Henderson (directors), Caleb Meurer	January 21, 2002	5572–177	5.74 3.29 (HH)
45	5	"Doing Time"	Frank Weiss	Written by : Aaron Springer, C.H. Greenblatt, and Merriwether Williams; Storyboarded by : Aaron Springer (director), C.H. Greenblatt	January 21, 2002	5572–186	5.74 3.29 (HH)
46	6	"Snowball Effect"	Andrew Overtoom	Written by : Paul Tibbitt, Kent Osborne, and Merriwether Williams; Storyboarded by : Paul Tibbitt & Kent Osborne (directors), Carson Kugler, William Reiss, & Mike Roth	February 22, 2002	5572–189	3.85 2.29 (HH)
46	6	"One Krabs Trash"	Tom Yasumi	Written by : Paul Tibbitt, Kent Osborne, and Mark O'Hare; Storyboarded by : Paul Tibbitt & Kaz (directors), Carson Kugler, William Reiss, & Mike Roth	February 22, 2002	5572–184	3.85 2.29 (HH)
47	7	"As Seen on TV"	Frank Weiss	Written by : Aaron Springer, C.H. Greenblatt, and Merriwether Williams; Storyboarded by : Aaron Springer (director), C.H. Greenblatt	March 8, 2002	5572–172	3.65
47	7	"Can You Spare a Dime?"	Sean Dempsey	Written by : Jay Lender, Sam Henderson, and Merriwether Williams; Storyboarded by : Jay Lender & Sam Henderson (directors), Caleb Meurer	March 8, 2002	5572–190	3.65
48	8	"No Weenies Allowed"	Andrew Overtoom	Written by : Paul Tibbitt, Kent Osborne, and Merriwether Williams; Storyboarded by : Paul Tibbitt & Kent Osborne (directors), Carson Kugler, Caleb Meurer, & William Reiss	March 15, 2002	5572–200	4.78 2.92 (HH)
48	8	"Squilliam Returns"	Sean Dempsey	Written by : Jay Lender, Sam Henderson, and Merriwether Williams; Storyboarded by : Jay Lender & Sam Henderson (directors), Heather Martinez & Mike Roth	March 15, 2002	5572–199	4.78 2.92 (HH)
49	9	"Krab Borg"	Tom Yasumi	Written by : Paul Tibbitt, Kent Osborne, and Mark O'Hare; Storyboarded by : Paul Tibbitt & Kent Osborne (directors), Carson Kugler, William Reiss, & Mike Roth	March 29, 2002	5572–197	4.58 2.65 (HH)
49	9	"Rock-a-Bye Bivalve"	Sean Dempsey	Written by : Jay Lender, Sam Henderson, and Mark O'Hare; Storyboarded by : Jay Lender & Sam Henderson (directors), Mike Roth	March 29, 2002	5572–203	4.58 2.65 (HH)
50	10	"Wet Painters"	Frank Weiss	Written by : C.H. Greenblatt, Kaz, and Mark O'Hare; Storyboarded by : C.H. Greenblatt & Kaz (directors), Caleb Meurer & Carson Kugler	May 10, 2002	5572–202	3.86 2.60 (HH)
50	10	"Krusty Krab Training Video"	Frank Weiss	Written by : Aaron Springer, C.H. Greenblatt, Kent Osborne; Storyboarded by : Aaron Springer & C.H. Greenblatt (directors), Caleb Meurer	May 10, 2002	5572–198	3.86 2.60 (HH)
51	11	"Party Pooper Pants" "SpongeBob's House Party"	Andrew Overtoom	Written by : Paul Tibbitt, Kent Osborne, and Mark O'Hare; Merriwether Williams, Paul Tibbitt, Kent Osborne (Live Action); Storyboarded by : Paul Tibbitt & Kent Osborne (directors), Walt Dohrn(song sequence), Caleb Meurer, Carson Kugler, William Reiss, & Mike Roth	May 17, 2002	5572–204	6.32 3.88 (HH)
51	11	"Party Pooper Pants" "SpongeBob's House Party"	Andrew Overtoom	Written by : Paul Tibbitt, Kent Osborne, and Mark O'Hare; Merriwether Williams, Paul Tibbitt, Kent Osborne (Live Action); Storyboarded by : Paul Tibbitt & Kent Osborne (directors), Walt Dohrn(song sequence), Caleb Meurer, Carson Kugler, William Reiss, & Mike Roth	May 17, 2002	5572–205	6.32 3.88 (HH)
52	12	"Chocolate with Nuts"	Andrew Overtoom	Written by : Paul Tibbitt, Kaz, Kent Osborne, and Merriwether Williams; Storyboarded by : Paul Tibbitt & Kaz (directors), Carson Kugler, William Reiss, & Mike Roth	June 1, 2002	5572–196	4.33 3.41 (HH)
52	12	"Mermaid Man and Barnacle Boy V"	Frank Weiss	Written by : C.H. Greenblatt, Kaz, and Merriwether Williams; Storyboarded by : C.H. Greenblatt & Kaz (directors), Mike Roth	June 1, 2002	5572–206	4.33 3.41 (HH)
53	13	"New Student Starfish"	Tom Yasumi	Written by : Paul Tibbitt, Kent Osborne, and Mark O'Hare; Storyboarded by : Paul Tibbitt & Kent Osborne (directors), Carson Kugler, Heather Martinez, William Reiss, & Mike Roth	September 20, 2002	5572–201	3.92 2.69 (HH)
53	13	"Clams"	Sean Dempsey	Written by : Jay Lender, Sam Henderson, and Mark O'Hare; Storyboarded by : Jay Lender & Sam Henderson (directors), Caleb Meurer	September 20, 2002	5572–207	3.92 2.69 (HH)
54	14	"Ugh" "SpongeBob BC"	Andrew Overtoom	Written by : Paul Tibbitt and Kent Osborne; Merriwether Williams (Live Action); Storyboarded by : Paul Tibbitt and Kent Osborne (directors), Carson Kugler, Caleb Meurer, & William Reiss	March 5, 2004	5572–208	5.96 4.11 (HH)
54	14	"Ugh" "SpongeBob BC"	Andrew Overtoom	Written by : Paul Tibbitt and Kent Osborne; Merriwether Williams (Live Action); Storyboarded by : Paul Tibbitt and Kent Osborne (directors), Carson Kugler, Caleb Meurer, & William Reiss	March 5, 2004	5572–220	5.96 4.11 (HH)
55	15	"The Great Snail Race"	Andrew Overtoom	Written by : Paul Tibbitt, Kent Osborne, and Joe Liss (TV), Merriwether Williams (DVD); Storyboarded by : Paul Tibbitt and Kent Osborne (directors), Chuck Klein, Carson Kugler, Caleb Meurer, & William Reiss	January 24, 2003	5572–216	4.10 2.72 (HH)
55	15	"Mid-Life Crustacean"	Frank Weiss	Written by : C.H. Greenblatt, Kaz, and Mark O'Hare; Storyboarded by : C.H. Greenblatt & Kaz (directors), Chuck Klein	January 24, 2003	5572–210	4.10 2.72 (HH)
56	16	"Born Again Krabs"	Tom Yasumi	Written by : Paul Tibbitt, Kent Osborne, and Merriwether Williams; Storyboarded by : Paul Tibbitt and Kent Osborne (directors), Chuck Klein, Carson Kugler, Caleb Meurer, & William Reiss	October 4, 2003 (Note: Both episodes was first released on Tales from the Deep DVD on January 28, 2003.)	5572–213	3.60
56	16	"I Had an Accident"	Frank Weiss	Written by : C.H. Greenblatt, Kaz, and Merriwether Williams; Storyboarded by : C.H. Greenblatt & Kaz (directors), Chuck Klein	October 4, 2003	5572–214	3.60
57	17	"Krabby Land"	Andrew Overtoom	Written by : Paul Tibbitt, Kent Osborne, and Mark O'Hare; Storyboarded by : Paul Tibbit & Kent Osborne (directors), Chuck Klein, Carson Kugler, Caleb Meurer, & William Reiss	April 3, 2004	5572–212	5.40 3.57 (HH)
57	17	"The Camping Episode"	Sean Dempsey	Written by : Jay Lender, Sam Henderson, and Merriwether Williams; Storyboarded by : Jay Lender & Dan Povenmire (directors), Caleb Meurer	April 3, 2004	5572–215	5.40 3.57 (HH)
58	18	"Missing Identity"	Tom Yasumi	Written by : Paul Tibbitt, Kent Osborne, and Merriwether Williams; Storyboarded by : Paul Tibbitt and Kent Osborne (directors), Zeus Cervas, Carson Kugler, Caleb Meurer, & William Reiss	January 19, 2004	5572–209	5.66 4.07 (HH)
58	18	"Plankton's Army"	Sean Dempsey	Written by : Jay Lender, Sam Henderson, and Merriwether Williams; Storyboarded by : Jay Lender & Sam Henderson (directors), Caleb Meurer	January 19, 2004	5572–211	5.66 4.07 (HH)
59	19	"The Sponge Who Could Fly" "Lost Episode"	Andrew Overtoom and Tom Yasumi	Written by : Paul Tibbitt, Kent Osborne, and Merriwether Williams; Jay Lender and Sam Henderson (Live Action); Storyboarded by : Paul Tibbitt and Kent Osborne (directors), Carson Kugler, Caleb Meurer, & William Reiss	March 21, 2003 (Note: This episode was first released in The Sponge Who Can Fly VHS and Lost at Sea DVD on March 4, 2003.)	5572–217	7.64 4.33 (HH)
59	19	"The Sponge Who Could Fly" "Lost Episode"	Andrew Overtoom and Tom Yasumi	Written by : Paul Tibbitt, Kent Osborne, and Merriwether Williams; Jay Lender and Sam Henderson (Live Action); Storyboarded by : Paul Tibbitt and Kent Osborne (directors), Carson Kugler, Caleb Meurer, & William Reiss	March 21, 2003	5572–219	7.64 4.33 (HH)
60	20	"SpongeBob Meets the Strangler"	Tom Yasumi	Written by : Paul Tibbitt, Kent Osborne, C.H. Greenblatt, and Merriwether Williams; Storyboarded by : Paul Tibbitt, Kaz, & C.H. Greenblatt (directors), Zeus Cervas, Chuck Klein, Carson Kugler, & Mike Roth	October 11, 2004 (Note: Both episodes was first released on The Seascape Capers VHS/DVD on January 6, 2004.)	5572–221	4.61 3.47 (HH)
60	20	"Pranks a Lot"	Andrew Overtoom	Written by : Paul Tibbitt, Kent Osborne, and Merriwether Williams; Storyboarded by : Paul Tibbitt and Kent Osborne (directors), Carson Kugler, Caleb Meurer, & William Reiss	October 11, 2004	5572–218	4.61 3.47 (HH)

=== Season 4 (2005–07) ===
The fourth season of SpongeBob SquarePants consists of 20 episodes (38 segments), which are ordered below by packaging number and not their original broadcast order.

No. overall	No. in season	Title	Animation direction by	Written by	Original release date	Prod. code	U.S. viewers (millions)
61	1	"Fear of a Krabby Patty"	Alan Smart	Written by : C.H. Greenblatt and Paul Tibbitt; Storyboarded by : C.H. Greenblatt (director), Zeus Cervas	May 6, 2005	5574–401	3.81 2.60 (HH)
61	1	"Shell of a Man" "Molting"	Tom Yasumi	Written by : Mike Bell and Paul Tibbitt; Storyboarded by : Mike Bell and Vincent Waller (directors), Zeus Cervas & Brad Vandergrift	May 6, 2005	5574–402	3.81 2.60 (HH)
62	2	"The Lost Mattress"	Alan Smart	Written by : Mike Bell and Tim Hill; Storyboarded by : Mike Bell (director)	May 13, 2005	5574–406	3.34
62	2	"Krabs vs. Plankton"	Tom Yasumi	Written by : Tim Hill, Mike Mitchell, and Vincent Waller; Storyboarded by : Vincent Waller (director)	May 13, 2005	5574–403	3.34
63	3	"Have You Seen This Snail?" "Where's Gary"	Alan Smart and Tom Yasumi	Written by : Aaron Springer and Paul Tibbitt; Storyboarded by : Aaron Springer (director), Zeus Cervas, Garrett Ho, Brad Vandergrift and Erik Wiese	November 11, 2005	5574–404	7.93 4.95 (HH)
63	3	"Have You Seen This Snail?" "Where's Gary"	Alan Smart and Tom Yasumi	Written by : Aaron Springer and Paul Tibbitt; Storyboarded by : Aaron Springer (director), Zeus Cervas, Garrett Ho, Brad Vandergrift and Erik Wiese	November 11, 2005	5574–405	7.93 4.95 (HH)
64	4	"Skill Crane"	Alan Smart	Written by : Kyle McCulloch, Aaron Springer, and Vincent Waller; Storyboarded by : Vincent Waller (director)	May 20, 2005	5574–407	3.26
64	4	"Good Neighbors"	Tom Yasumi	Written by : Mike Bell; Storyboarded by : Mike Bell and Aaron Springer (directors)	May 20, 2005	5574–408	3.26
65	5	"Selling Out"	Alan Smart	Written by : Zeus Cervas, Erik C. Wiese, and Tim Hill; Storyboarded by : Zeus Cervas and Erik C. Wiese (directors)	September 23, 2005	5574–409	2.53
65	5	"Funny Pants"	Tom Yasumi	Written by : Luke Brookshier, Tom King, and Steven Banks; Storyboarded by : Luke Brookshier and Tom King (directors)	September 30, 2005	5574–410	2.85
66	6	"Dunces and Dragons" "Lost in Time"	Alan Smart and Tom Yasumi	Written by : Zeus Cervas, Erik Wiese, and Tim Hill; Storyboarded by : Zeus Cervas and Erik Wiese (directors)	February 20, 2006	5574–412	8.56 5.43 (HH)
66	6	"Dunces and Dragons" "Lost in Time"	Alan Smart and Tom Yasumi	Written by : Zeus Cervas, Erik Wiese, and Tim Hill; Storyboarded by : Zeus Cervas and Erik Wiese (directors)	February 20, 2006	5574–413	8.56 5.43 (HH)
67	7	"Enemy In-Law"	Andrew Overtoom	Written by : Tom King, Luke Brookshier, and Tim Hill; Storyboarded by : Luke Brookshier and Tom King (directors)	October 14, 2005	5574–414	2.08
67	7	"Mermaid Man and Barnacle Boy VI: The Motion Picture"	Andrew Overtoom	Written by : Casey Alexander, Chris Mitchell, and Paul Tibbitt; Storyboarded by : Casey Alexander and Chris Mitchell (directors)	October 7, 2005	5574–411	2.68
68	8	"Patrick SmartPants"	Tom Yasumi	Written by : Casey Alexander, Chris Mitchell, and Tim Hill; Storyboarded by : Casey Alexander and Chris Mitchell (directors)	October 21, 2005	5574–415	2.73
68	8	"SquidBob TentaclePants"	Alan Smart	Written by : Zeus Cervas, Erik Wiese, and Steven Banks; Storyboarded by : Zeus Cervas and Erik Wiese (directors)	November 4, 2005	5574–416	3.28
69	9	"Krusty Towers"	Andrew Overtoom	Written by : Luke Brookshier, Tom King, and Steven Banks; Storyboarded by : Luke Brookshier and Tom King (directors)	April 1, 2006	5574–417	5.83 3.80 (HH)
69	9	"Mrs. Puff, You're Fired"	Tom Yasumi	Written by : Casey Alexander, Chris Mitchell, and Tim Hill; Storyboarded by : Casey Alexander and Chris Mitchell (directors)	April 1, 2006	5574–418	5.83 3.80 (HH)
70	10	"Chimps Ahoy"	Andrew Overtoom	Written by : Luke Brookshier, Tom King, and Steven Banks; Storyboarded by : Luke Brookshier and Tom King (directors)	May 5, 2006	5574–426	2.16
70	10	"Ghost Host"	Alan Smart	Written by : Zeus Cervas, Erik Wiese, and Tim Hill; Storyboarded by : Zeus Cervas and Erik Wiese (directors)	May 5, 2006	5574–419	2.16
71	11	"Whale of a Birthday"	Tom Yasumi	Written by : Luke Brookshier, Tom King, and Paul Tibbitt; Storyboarded by : Luke Brookshier and Tom King (directors)	May 12, 2006	5574–423	2.85
71	11	"Karate Island"	Tom Yasumi	Written by : Casey Alexander, Chris Mitchell, and Steven Banks; Storyboarded by : Casey Alexander and Chris Mitchell (directors)	May 12, 2006	5574–421	2.85
72	12	"All That Glitters"	Andrew Overtoom	Written by : Zeus Cervas, Erik Wiese, and Steven Banks; Storyboarded by : Zeus Cervas and Erik Wiese (directors)	June 2, 2006	5574–422	3.37
72	12	"Wishing You Well"	Andrew Overtoom	Written by : Luke Brookshier, Tom King, and Steven Banks; Storyboarded by : Luke Brookshier and Tom King (directors)	June 2, 2006	5574–420	3.37
73	13	"New Leaf"	Alan Smart	Written by : Zeus Cervas, Erik Wiese, and Steven Banks; Storyboarded by : Zeus Cervas and Erik Wiese (directors)	September 22, 2006 (Note: This episode was first released in Karate Island DVD on July 18, 2006.)	5574–425	2.58
73	13	"Once Bitten"	Alan Smart	Written by : Casey Alexander, Chris Mitchell, and Steven Banks; Storyboarded by : Casey Alexander and Chris Mitchell (directors)	September 29, 2006	5574–424	3.05
74	14	"Bummer Vacation"	Tom Yasumi	Written by : Casey Alexander, Chris Mitchell, and Dani Michaeli; Storyboarded by : Casey Alexander and Chris Mitchell (directors)	October 13, 2006	5574–427	3.10
74	14	"Wigstruck"	Alan Smart	Written by : Luke Brookshier, Tom King, and Dani Michaeli; Storyboarded by : Luke Brookshier and Tom King (directors)	November 17, 2006 (Note: This episode was first released in Whale of a Birthday DVD on October 31, 2006.)	5574–428	2.64
75	15	"Squidtastic Voyage"	Tom Yasumi	Written by : Luke Brookshier, Tom King, and Dani Michaeli; Storyboarded by : Luke Brookshier and Tom King (directors)	October 6, 2006	5574–431	3.17
75	15	"That's No Lady"	Andrew Overtoom	Written by : Casey Alexander, Chris Mitchell, and Steven Banks; Storyboarded by : Casey Alexander and Chris Mitchell (directors)	November 25, 2006	5574–430	2.99
76	16	"The Thing"	Andrew Overtoom	Written by : Zeus Cervas, Erik Wiese, and Steven Banks; Storyboarded by : Zeus Cervas and Erik Wiese (directors)	January 15, 2007 (Note: This episode was first released in Season 4, Volume 2 DVD on January 9, 2007.)	5574–429	3.60 2.88 (HH)
76	16	"Hocus Pocus"	Alan Smart	Written by : Casey Alexander, Chris Mitchell, and Steven Banks; Storyboarded by : Casey Alexander and Chris Mitchell (directors)	January 15, 2007	5574–432	3.60 2.88 (HH)
77	17	"Driven to Tears"	Andrew Overtoom	Written by : Luke Brookshier, Tom King, and Steven Banks; Storyboarded by : Luke Brookshier and Tom King (directors)	February 19, 2007	5574–434	4.99 3.34 (HH)
77	17	"Rule of Dumb"	Tom Yasumi	Written by : Zeus Cervas, Erik Wiese, and Dani Michaeli; Storyboarded by : Zeus Cervas and Erik Wiese (directors)	February 19, 2007	5574–433	4.99 3.34 (HH)
78	18	"Born to Be Wild"	Tom Yasumi	Written by : Luke Brookshier, Tom King, and Steven Banks; Storyboarded by : Luke Brookshier and Tom King (directors)	March 31, 2007	5574–437	4.42 2.99 (HH)
78	18	"Best Frenemies"	Alan Smart	Written by : Zeus Cervas, Erik Wiese, and Dani Michaeli; Storyboarded by : Zeus Cervas and Erik Wiese (directors)	March 31, 2007	5574–436	4.42 2.99 (HH)
79	19	"The Pink Purloiner"	Tom Yasumi	Written by : Luke Brookshier, Tom King, and Steven Banks; Storyboarded by : Luke Brookshier and Tom King (directors)	February 19, 2007	5574–440	5.39 3.41 (HH)
79	19	"Squid Wood"	Andrew Overtoom	Written by : Casey Alexander, Chris Mitchell, and Dani Michaeli; Storyboarded by : Casey Alexander and Chris Mitchell (directors)	July 24, 2007	5574–438	3.91
80	20	"Best Day Ever"	Larry Leichliter	Written by : Nate Cash, Tuck Tucker, and Steven Banks; Storyboarded by : Nate Cash and Tuck Tucker (directors)	November 10, 2006	151–507	6.66
80	20	"The Gift of Gum"	Alan Smart	Written by : Zeus Cervas, Erik Wiese, and Dani Michaeli; Storyboarded by : Zeus Cervas and Erik Wiese (directors)	February 19, 2007	5574–439	5.39 3.41 (HH)

=== Season 5 (2007–09) ===
The fifth season of SpongeBob SquarePants consists of 20 episodes (41 segments), which are ordered below by packaging number and not their original broadcast order.

No. overall	No. in season	Title	Animation direction by	Written by	Original release date	Prod. code	U.S. viewers (millions)
81	1	"Friend or Foe"	Alan Smart and Tom Yasumi	Written by : Casey Alexander, Zeus Cervas, Mike Mitchell, Steven Banks, and Tim Hill; Storyboarded by : Casey Alexander, Zeus Cervas, and Mike Mitchell (directors)	April 13, 2007	151–501	5.91
81	1	"Friend or Foe"	Alan Smart and Tom Yasumi	Written by : Casey Alexander, Zeus Cervas, Mike Mitchell, Steven Banks, and Tim Hill; Storyboarded by : Casey Alexander, Zeus Cervas, and Mike Mitchell (directors)	April 13, 2007	151–502	5.91
82	2	"The Original Fry Cook"	Andrew Overtoom	Written by : Luke Brookshier, Tom King, Steven Banks, and Dani Michaeli; Storyboarded by : Luke Brookshier and Tom King (directors)	July 30, 2007 (Note: This episode was first released on the Friend or Foe? DVD on April 17, 2007.)	151–503	2.85
82	2	"Night Light"	Andrew Overtoom	Written by : Casey Alexander, Chris Mitchell, and Steven Banks; Storyboarded by : Casey Alexander and Chris Mitchell (directors)	July 30, 2007	5574–435	2.85
83	3	"Rise and Shine"	Andrew Overtoom	Written by : Nate Cash and Steven Banks; Storyboarded by : Nate Cash (director)	February 19, 2007	151–504–4	5.34
83	3	"Waiting"	Alan Smart	Written by : Nate Cash, Tuck Tucker, and Steven Banks; Storyboarded by : Nate Cash and Tuck Tucker (directors)	February 19, 2007	151–504–7	5.34
83	3	"Fungus Among Us"	Tom Yasumi	Written by : Casey Alexander, Zeus Cervas, and Richard Pursel; Storyboarded by : Casey Alexander and Zeus Cervas (directors)	September 29, 2007	151–505	2.26
84	4	"Spy Buddies"	Andrew Overtoom	Written by : Luke Brookshier, Tom King, and Dani Michaeli; Storyboarded by : Luke Brookshier and Tom King (directors)	July 23, 2007 (Note: "Spy Buddies" was first released on the Friend or Foe? DVD on April 17, 2007.) (Note: "Boat Smarts" and "Good Ol ' Whatshisname" was first released on the Bikini Bottom Adventures DVD on June 5, 2007.)	151–506	4.93
84	4	"Boat Smarts"	Alan Smart	Written by : Casey Alexander, Zeus Cervas, and Richard Pursel; Storyboarded by : Casey Alexander and Zeus Cervas (directors)	July 23, 2007	151–508–4	4.93
84	4	"Good Ol' Whatshisname"	Alan Smart	Written by : Casey Alexander, Zeus Cervas, and Dani Michaeli (TV), Richard Pursel (DVD); Storyboarded by : Casey Alexander and Zeus Cervas (directors)	July 23, 2007	151–508–7	4.93
85	5	"New Digs"	Andrew Overtoom	Written by : Nate Cash, Tuck Tucker, and Richard Pursel; Storyboarded by : Nate Cash and Tuck Tucker (directors)	July 25, 2007 (Note: This episode was first released on the Bikini Bottom Adventures DVD on June 5, 2007.)	151–510	3.90
85	5	"Krabs à la Mode"	Tom Yasumi	Written by : Luke Brookshier, Tom King, and Eric Shaw; Storyboarded by : Luke Brookshier and Tom King (directors)	July 25, 2007	151–509	3.90
86	6	"Roller Cowards"	Alan Smart	Written by : Luke Brookshier, Tom King, and Steven Banks; Storyboarded by : Luke Brookshier and Tom King (directors)	July 27, 2007	151–512	3.03
86	6	"Bucket Sweet Bucket"	Larry Leichliter	Written by : Casey Alexander, Zeus Cervas, and Richard Pursel; Storyboarded by : Casey Alexander and Zeus Cervas (directors)	July 27, 2007	151–511	3.03
87	7	"To Love a Patty"	Andrew Overtoom	Written by : Casey Alexander, Zeus Cervas, and Eric Shaw; Storyboarded by : Casey Alexander and Zeus Cervas (directors)	July 26, 2007 (Note: "Breath of Fresh Squidward" was first released on the Bikini Bottom Adventures DVD on June 5, 2007.)	151–514	3.68
87	7	"Breath of Fresh Squidward"	Tom Yasumi	Written by : Nate Cash, Tuck Tucker, and Richard Pursel; Storyboarded by : Nate Cash and Tuck Tucker (directors)	July 26, 2007	151–513	3.68
88	8	"Money Talks"	Alan Smart	Written by : Luke Brookshier, Tom King, and Dani Michaeli; Storyboarded by : Luke Brookshier & Tom King (directors)	July 31, 2007	151–515–7	3.46
88	8	"SpongeBob vs. The Patty Gadget"	Alan Smart	Written by : Luke Brookshier and Richard Pursel; Storyboarded by : Luke Brookshier (director)	July 31, 2007	151–515–4	3.46
88	8	"Slimy Dancing"	Tom Yasumi	Written by : Nate Cash, Tuck Tucker, and Richard Pursel; Storyboarded by : Nate Cash and Tuck Tucker (directors)	July 31, 2007	151–516	3.46
89	9	"The Krusty Sponge"	Andrew Overtoom	Written by : Aaron Springer and Eric Shaw; Storyboarded by : Aaron Springer (director)	July 24, 2007	151–519	3.91
89	9	"Sing a Song of Patrick"	Alan Smart	Written by : Luke Brookshier, Tom King, and Steven Banks; Storyboarded by : Luke Brookshier and Tom King (directors)	February 19, 2007	151–520	5.34
90	10	"A Flea in Her Dome"	Andrew Overtoom	Written by : Casey Alexander, Zeus Cervas, and Steven Banks; Storyboarded by : Casey Alexander and Zeus Cervas (directors)	August 1, 2007	151–522	2.77
90	10	"The Donut of Shame"	Tom Yasumi	Written by : Nate Cash and Dani Michaeli; Storyboarded by : Nate Cash (director)	August 1, 2007	151–521–7	2.77
90	10	"The Krusty Plate"	Tom Yasumi	Written by : Tuck Tucker and Eric Shaw; Storyboarded by : Tuck Tucker (director)	August 1, 2007	151–521–4	2.77
91	11	"Goo Goo Gas"	Alan Smart	Written by : Luke Brookshier, Tom King, and Dani Michaeli; Storyboarded by : Luke Brookshier and Tom King (directors)	July 19, 2009 (Note: This episode was first released on the SpongeBob's WhoBob WhatPants? DVD on October 14, 2008.)	151–523	4.85
91	11	"Le Big Switch"	Tom Yasumi	Written by : Nate Cash, Tuck Tucker, and Richard Pursel; Storyboarded by : Nate Cash and Tuck Tucker (directors)	September 29, 2007	151–524	2.26
92 (Note: Alternatively listed under the syndication number #998.)	12	"Atlantis SquarePantis"	Andrew Overtoom	Written by : Casey Alexander, Zeus Cervas, Steven Banks, and Dani Michaeli; Storyboarded by : Casey Alexander and Zeus Cervas (directors)	November 12, 2007 (Without Patchy Segments); November 23, 2007 (With Patchy Segments)	151–517	8.76
92	12	"Atlantis SquarePantis"	Andrew Overtoom	Written by : Casey Alexander, Zeus Cervas, Steven Banks, and Dani Michaeli; Storyboarded by : Casey Alexander and Zeus Cervas (directors)	November 12, 2007 (Without Patchy Segments); November 23, 2007 (With Patchy Segments)	151–518	8.76
93	13	"Picture Day"	Alan Smart	Written by : Casey Alexander and Dani Michaeli; Storyboarded by : Casey Alexander (director)	August 2, 2007	151–529–7	3.33
93	13	"Pat No Pay"	Alan Smart	Written by : Zeus Cervas and Dani Michaeli; Storyboarded by : Zeus Cervas (director)	August 2, 2007	151–529–4	3.33
93	13	"BlackJack"	Alan Smart	Written by : Casey Alexander, Zeus Cervas, and Richard Pursel; Storyboarded by : Casey Alexander and Zeus Cervas (directors)	August 2, 2007	151–525	3.33
94	14	"Blackened Sponge"	Tom Yasumi	Written by : Greg Miller, Aaron Springer, and Eric Shaw; Storyboarded by : Greg Miller and Aaron Springer (directors)	August 3, 2007	151–530	3.28
94	14	"Mermaid Man vs. SpongeBob"	Tom Yasumi	Written by : Nate Cash, Tuck Tucker, and Eric Shaw; Storyboarded by : Nate Cash and Tuck Tucker (directors)	August 3, 2007	151–528	3.28
95	15	"The Inmates of Summer"	Alan Smart	Written by : Chris Reccardi, Aaron Springer, and Dani Michaeli; Storyboarded by : Chris Reccardi and Aaron Springer (directors)	November 23, 2007	151–534	4.08
95	15	"To Save a Squirrel"	Alan Smart	Written by : Luke Brookshier, Nate Cash, and Dani Michaeli; Storyboarded by : Luke Brookshier and Nate Cash (directors)	November 23, 2007	151–531	4.26
96	16	"Pest of the West"	Andrew Overtoom and Tom Yasumi	Written by : Luke Brookshier, Tom King, Steven Banks, and Richard Pursel; Storyboarded by : Luke Brookshier and Tom King (directors)	April 11, 2008	151–526	6.14
96	16	"Pest of the West"	Andrew Overtoom and Tom Yasumi	Written by : Luke Brookshier, Tom King, Steven Banks, and Richard Pursel; Storyboarded by : Luke Brookshier and Tom King (directors)	April 11, 2008	151–527	6.14
97	17	"20,000 Patties Under the Sea"	Tom Yasumi	Written by : Chris Reccardi, Aaron Springer, and Richard Pursel; Storyboarded by : Chris Reccardi and Aaron Springer (directors)	November 23, 2007	151–537	4.29
97	17	"The Battle of Bikini Bottom"	Andrew Overtoom	Written by : Luke Brookshier, Nate Cash, and Eric Shaw; Storyboarded by : Luke Brookshier and Nate Cash (directors)	November 23, 2007	151–538	4.26
98	18	"What Ever Happened to SpongeBob?" "WhoBob WhatPants?"	Alan Smart and Tom Yasumi	Written by : Casey Alexander, Zeus Cervas, and Steven Banks; Storyboarded by : Casey Alexander and Zeus Cervas (directors)	October 13, 2008	151–535	7.67
98	18	"What Ever Happened to SpongeBob?" "WhoBob WhatPants?"	Alan Smart and Tom Yasumi	Written by : Casey Alexander, Zeus Cervas, and Steven Banks; Storyboarded by : Casey Alexander and Zeus Cervas (directors)	October 13, 2008	151–536	7.67
99	19	"The Two Faces of Squidward"	Tom Yasumi	Written by : Charlie Bean, Aaron Springer, and Steven Banks; Storyboarded by : Charlie Bean and Aaron Springer (directors)	November 23, 2007	151–540	4.08
99	19	"SpongeHenge"	Andrew Overtoom	Written by : Casey Alexander, Zeus Cervas, Richard Pursel; Storyboarded by : Casey Alexander and Zeus Cervas (directors)	November 23, 2007	151–532	4.29
100	20	"Banned in Bikini Bottom"	Alan Smart	Written by : Aaron Springer and Steven Banks; Storyboarded by : Aaron Springer (director)	November 23, 2007	151–539	4.26
100	20	"Stanley S. SquarePants"	Andrew Overtoom	Written by : Luke Brookshier, Nate Cash, and Eric Shaw; Storyboarded by : Luke Brookshier and Nate Cash (directors)	November 23, 2007	151–533	4.26

=== Season 6 (2008–10) ===
The sixth season of SpongeBob SquarePants consists of 26 episodes (47 segments), which are ordered below by packaging number and not their original broadcast order.

No. overall	No. in season	Title	Animation direction by	Written by	Original release date	Prod. code	U.S. viewers (millions)
101	1	"House Fancy"	Tom Yasumi	Written by : Aaron Springer and Dani Michaeli; Storyboarded by : Aaron Springer (director)	June 6, 2008	193–603	3.50
101	1	"Krabby Road"	Alan Smart	Written by : Luke Brookshier, Nate Cash, and Eric Shaw; Storyboarded by : Luke Brookshier and Nate Cash (directors)	March 3, 2008	193–602	4.70
102	2	"Penny Foolish"	Alan Smart	Written by : Aaron Springer and Dani Michaeli; Storyboarded by : Aaron Springer (director)	March 7, 2008	193–606	4.68
102	2	"Nautical Novice"	Tom Yasumi	Written by : Casey Alexander, Zeus Cervas, and Derek Iversen; Storyboarded by : Casey Alexander and Zeus Cervas (directors)	March 29, 2008	193–607	4.47
103	3	"Spongicus"	Andrew Overtoom	Written by : Casey Alexander, Zeus Cervas, and Richard Pursel; Storyboarded by : Casey Alexander and Zeus Cervas (directors)	March 29, 2008	193–601	4.47
103	3	"Suction Cup Symphony"	Andrew Overtoom	Written by : Luke Brookshier, Nate Cash, and Richard Pursel; Storyboarded by : Luke Brookshier and Nate Cash (directors)	March 6, 2008	193–605	3.44
104	4	"Not Normal"	Andrew Overtoom	Written by : Casey Alexander, Zeus Cervas, and Derek Iversen; Storyboarded by : Casey Alexander and Zeus Cervas (directors)	March 4, 2008	193–604	4.05
104	4	"Gone"	Alan Smart	Written by : Luke Brookshier, Nate Cash, and Steven Banks; Storyboarded by : Luke Brookshier and Nate Cash (directors)	March 5, 2008	193–608	3.85
105	5	"The Splinter"	Tom Yasumi	Written by : Nate Cash, Sean Charmatz, and Steven Banks; Storyboarded by : Nate Cash and Sean Charmatz (directors)	June 2, 2008	193–618	3.77
105	5	"Slide Whistle Stooges"	Alan Smart	Written by : Casey Alexander, Zeus Cervas, and Derek Iversen; Storyboarded by : Casey Alexander and Zeus Cervas (directors)	February 16, 2009	193–613	4.51
106	6	"A Life in a Day"	Andrew Overtoom	Written by : Chris Reccardi and Dani Michaeli; Storyboarded by : Chris Reccardi (director)	June 4, 2008	193–616	3.06
106	6	"Sun Bleached"	Tom Yasumi	Written by : Luke Brookshier, Nate Cash, and Richard Pursel; Storyboarded by : Luke Brookshier and Nate Cash (directors)	June 5, 2008	193–612	3.41
107	7	"Giant Squidward"	Alan Smart	Written by : Luke Brookshier, Nate Cash, and Richard Pursel; Storyboarded by : Luke Brookshier and Nate Cash (directors)	June 3, 2008	193–614	3.81
107	7	"No Nose Knows"	Andrew Overtoom	Written by : Casey Alexander, Zeus Cervas, and Derek Iversen; Storyboarded by : Casey Alexander and Zeus Cervas (directors)	August 4, 2008	193–617	3.75
108	8	"Patty Caper"	Andrew Overtoom	Written by : Casey Alexander, Zeus Cervas, and Eric Shaw; Storyboarded by : Casey Alexander and Zeus Cervas (directors)	August 5, 2008	193–611	3.60
108	8	"Plankton's Regular"	Tom Yasumi	Written by : Casey Alexander, Zeus Cervas, and Dani Michaeli; Storyboarded by : Casey Alexander and Zeus Cervas (directors)	August 6, 2008	193–615	3.58
109	9	"Boating Buddies"	Andrew Overtoom	Written by : Aaron Springer and Richard Pursel; Storyboarded by : Aaron Springer (director)	August 7, 2008	193–620	3.52
109	9	"The Krabby Kronicle"	Tom Yasumi	Written by : Casey Alexander, Zeus Cervas, and Derek Iversen; Storyboarded by : Casey Alexander and Zeus Cervas (directors)	August 8, 2008	193–622	3.29
110	10	"The Slumber Party"	Alan Smart	Written by : Tom King and Dani Michaeli; Storyboarded by : Tom King (director)	November 28, 2008	193–623	4.34
110	10	"Grooming Gary"	Alan Smart	Written by : Casey Alexander, Zeus Cervas, and Dani Michaeli; Storyboarded by : Casey Alexander and Zeus Cervas (directors)	November 28, 2008	193–619	4.34
111	11	"SpongeBob SquarePants vs. The Big One" "SpongeBob SquarePants and the Big Wave"	Andrew Overtoom and Alan Smart	Written by : Aaron Springer, Paul Tibbitt, and Steven Banks; Storyboarded by : Aaron Springer (director)	April 17, 2009 (Note: This episode was first released on the SpongeBob vs. The Big One DVD on March 3, 2009.)	193–609	5.78
111	11	"SpongeBob SquarePants vs. The Big One" "SpongeBob SquarePants and the Big Wave"	Andrew Overtoom and Alan Smart	Written by : Aaron Springer, Paul Tibbitt, and Steven Banks; Storyboarded by : Aaron Springer (director)	April 17, 2009	193–610	5.78
112	12	"Porous Pockets"	Tom Yasumi	Written by : Aaron Springer and Derek Iversen; Storyboarded by : Aaron Springer (director)	November 28, 2008	193–624	3.93
112	12	"Choir Boys"	Andrew Overtoom	Written by : Aaron Springer and Richard Pursel; Storyboarded by : Aaron Springer (director)	March 20, 2009	193–626	3.21
113	13	"Krusty Krushers"	Alan Smart	Written by : Nate Cash, Sean Charmatz, and Derek Iversen; Storyboarded by : Nate Cash and Sean Charmatz (directors)	November 28, 2008	193–627	4.15
113	13	"The Card"	Tom Yasumi	Written by : Luke Brookshier, Nate Cash, and Steven Banks; Storyboarded by : Luke Brookshier and Nate Cash (directors)	November 28, 2008	193–621	4.15
114	14	"Dear Vikings"	Tom Yasumi	Written by : Aaron Springer and Dani Michaeli; Storyboarded by : Aaron Springer (director)	November 28, 2008	193–631	4.09
114	14	"Ditchin'"	Tom Yasumi	Written by : Casey Alexander, Zeus Cervas, and Dani Michaeli; Storyboarded by : Casey Alexander and Zeus Cervas (directors)	November 28, 2008	193–628	4.09
115	15	"Grandpappy the Pirate"	Alan Smart	Written by : Casey Alexander, Zeus Cervas, and Dani Michaeli; Storyboarded by : Casey Alexander and Zeus Cervas (directors)	February 18, 2009	193–629	3.77
115	15	"Cephalopod Lodge"	Andrew Overtoom	Written by : Luke Brookshier, Nate Cash, and Richard Pursel; Storyboarded by : Luke Brookshier and Nate Cash (directors)	February 17, 2009	193–625	3.64
116	16	"Squid's Visit"	Tom Yasumi	Written by : Casey Alexander, Zeus Cervas, and Derek Iversen; Storyboarded by : Casey Alexander and Zeus Cervas (directors)	June 4, 2009	193–632	3.61
116	16	"To SquarePants or Not to SquarePants"	Alan Smart	Written by : Luke Brookshier, Nate Cash, and Steven Banks; Storyboarded by : Luke Brookshier and Nate Cash (directors)	July 17, 2009	193–634	3.63
117	17	"Shuffleboarding"	Andrew Overtoom	Written by : Luke Brookshier, Nate Cash, and Derek Iversen; Storyboarded by : Luke Brookshier and Nate Cash (directors)	February 16, 2009	193–630	4.51
117	17	"Professor Squidward"	Andrew Overtoom	Written by : Aaron Springer and Dani Michaeli; Storyboarded by : Aaron Springer (director)	February 19, 2009	193–633	4.03
118	18	"Pet or Pests"	Andrew Overtoom	Written by : Aaron Springer and Richard Pursel; Storyboarded by : Aaron Springer (director)	March 18, 2009	193–639	3.18
118	18	"Komputer Overload"	Alan Smart	Written by : Aaron Springer and Richard Pursel; Storyboarded by : Aaron Springer (director)	March 19, 2009	193–635	3.61
119	19	"Gullible Pants"	Alan Smart	Written by : Luke Brookshier, Nate Cash, and Derek Iversen; Storyboarded by : Luke Brookshier and Nate Cash (directors)	June 5, 2009	193–638	3.00
119	19	"Overbooked"	Tom Yasumi	Written by : Casey Alexander, Zeus Cervas, and Derek Iversen; Storyboarded by : Casey Alexander and Zeus Cervas (directors)	July 19, 2009	193–637	5.37
120	20	"No Hat for Pat"	Tom Yasumi	Written by : Casey Alexander, Zeus Cervas, and Dani Michaeli; Storyboarded by : Casey Alexander and Zeus Cervas (directors)	July 19, 2009	193–640	4.85
120	20	"Toy Store of Doom"	Andrew Overtoom	Written by : Luke Brookshier, Nate Cash, and Dani Michaeli; Storyboarded by : Luke Brookshier and Nate Cash (directors)	March 17, 2009	193–636	3.49
121	21	"Sand Castles in the Sand"	Andrew Overtoom	Written by : Casey Alexander, Zeus Cervas, and Dani Michaeli; Storyboarded by : Casey Alexander and Zeus Cervas (directors)	March 16, 2009	193–642	4.14
121	21	"Shell Shocked"	Alan Smart	Written by : Casey Alexander, Zeus Cervas, and Richard Pursel; Storyboarded by : Casey Alexander and Zeus Cervas (directors)	June 1, 2009	193–641	3.96
122	22	"Chum Bucket Supreme"	Tom Yasumi	Written by : Sean Charmatz and Dani Michaeli; Storyboarded by : Sean Charmatz (director)	July 19, 2009	193–643	5.09
122	22	"Single Cell Anniversary"	Tom Yasumi	Written by : Luke Brookshier, Nate Cash, and Richard Pursel; Storyboarded by : Luke Brookshier and Nate Cash (directors)	June 3, 2009	193–652	3.53
123 (Note: Alternatively listed under the syndication number #997.)	23	"Truth or Square" "Stuck in the Freezer"	Andrew Overtoom, Alan Smart, and Tom Yasumi	Written by : Luke Brookshier, Nate Cash, Steven Banks, and Paul Tibbitt; Storyboarded by : Luke Brookshier and Nate Cash (directors)	November 6, 2009	193–645 193–646	7.66
124	24	"Truth or Square" "Stuck in the Freezer"	Andrew Overtoom, Alan Smart, and Tom Yasumi	Written by : Luke Brookshier, Nate Cash, Steven Banks, and Paul Tibbitt; Storyboarded by : Luke Brookshier and Nate Cash (directors)	November 6, 2009	193–647 193–648	7.66
125	25	"Pineapple Fever"	Tom Yasumi	Written by : Aaron Springer and Derek Iversen; Storyboarded by : Aaron Springer (director)	June 2, 2009	193–649	4.17
125	25	"Chum Caverns"	Alan Smart	Written by : Casey Alexander, Zeus Cervas, and Richard Pursel; Storyboarded by : Casey Alexander and Zeus Cervas (directors)	July 18, 2009	193–644	4.47
126	26	"The Clash of Triton" "Neptune's Party"	Andrew Overtoom and Alan Smart	Written by : Casey Alexander, Zeus Cervas, Aaron Springer, Steven Banks, and Paul Tibbitt; Storyboarded by : Casey Alexander, Zeus Cervas, and Aaron Springer (directors)	July 5, 2010	193–650	5.18
126	26	"The Clash of Triton" "Neptune's Party"	Andrew Overtoom and Alan Smart	Written by : Casey Alexander, Zeus Cervas, Aaron Springer, Steven Banks, and Paul Tibbitt; Storyboarded by : Casey Alexander, Zeus Cervas, and Aaron Springer (directors)	July 5, 2010	193–651	5.18

=== Season 7 (2009–11) ===
The seventh season of SpongeBob SquarePants consists of 26 episodes (50 segments), which are ordered below by packaging number and not their original broadcast order.

No. overall	No. in season	Title	Animation direction by	Written by	Original release date	Prod. code	U.S. viewers (millions)
Episodes 1–13
127	1	"Tentacle-Vision"	Alan Smart	Written by : Luke Brookshier, Nate Cash, and Derek Iversen; Storyboarded by : Luke Brookshier and Nate Cash (directors)	July 19, 2009	223–704	5.17
127	1	"I ♥ Dancing" "I Heart Dancing"	Tom Yasumi	Written by : Casey Alexander, Zeus Cervas, and Mr. Lawrence; Storyboarded by : Casey Alexander and Zeus Cervas (directors)	July 19, 2009	223–703	2.89
128	2	"Growth Spout"	Andrew Overtoom	Written by : Aaron Springer and Richard Pursel; Storyboarded by : Aaron Springer (director)	July 19, 2009	223–705	4.95
128	2	"Stuck in the Wringer"	Alan Smart	Written by : Zeus Cervas, Sean Charmatz, and Derek Iversen; Storyboarded by : Zeus Cervas and Sean Charmatz (directors)	July 19, 2009	223–701	5.37
129	3	"Someone's in the Kitchen with Sandy"	Tom Yasumi	Written by : Casey Alexander, Zeus Cervas, and Dani Michaeli; Storyboarded by : Casey Alexander and Zeus Cervas (directors)	July 19, 2009	223–706	5.09
129	3	"The Inside Job"	Andrew Overtoom	Written by : Luke Brookshier, Nate Cash, and Mr. Lawrence; Storyboarded by : Luke Brookshier and Nate Cash (directors)	July 19, 2009	223–702	5.17
130	4	"Greasy Buffoons"	Tom Yasumi	Written by : Aaron Springer and Derek Iversen; Storyboarded by : Aaron Springer (director)	November 27, 2009	223–709	4.25
130	4	"Model Sponge"	Tom Yasumi	Written by : Casey Alexander, Zeus Cervas, and Mr. Lawrence; Storyboarded by : Casey Alexander and Zeus Cervas (directors)	November 27, 2009	223–712	4.25
131	5	"Keep Bikini Bottom Beautiful"	Alan Smart	Written by : Luke Brookshier, Nate Cash, and Dani Michaeli; Storyboarded by : Luke Brookshier and Nate Cash (directors)	January 2, 2010	223–713	4.28
131	5	"A Pal for Gary"	Andrew Overtoom	Written by : Casey Alexander, Zeus Cervas, and Richard Pursel; Storyboarded by : Casey Alexander and Zeus Cervas (directors)	January 2, 2010	223–708	4.28
132	6	"Yours, Mine, and Mine"	Andrew Overtoom	Written by : Luke Brookshier, Nate Cash, and Steven Banks; Storyboarded by : Luke Brookshier and Nate Cash (directors)	September 11, 2010	223–711	4.53
132	6	"Kracked Krabs"	Alan Smart	Written by : Luke Brookshier, Nate Cash, and Mr. Lawrence; Storyboarded by : Luke Brookshier and Nate Cash (directors)	September 11, 2010	223–707	4.53
133	7	"The Curse of Bikini Bottom"	Andrew Overtoom	Written by : Luke Brookshier, Nate Cash, and Mr. Lawrence; Storyboarded by : Luke Brookshier and Nate Cash (directors)	October 24, 2009	223–717	4.95
133	7	"Squidward in Clarinetland"	Tom Yasumi	Written by : Casey Alexander, Zeus Cervas, and Dani Michaeli; Storyboarded by : Casey Alexander and Zeus Cervas (directors)	March 24, 2010	223–718	3.68
134	8	"SpongeBob's Last Stand"	Andrew Overtoom and Tom Yasumi	Written by : Aaron Springer, Steven Banks, and Derek Iversen; Storyboarded by : Aaron Springer (director)	April 22, 2010 (Note: This episode was first released on the SpongeBob's Last Stand DVD on March 16, 2010.)	223–714	4.76
134	8	"SpongeBob's Last Stand"	Andrew Overtoom and Tom Yasumi	Written by : Aaron Springer, Steven Banks, and Derek Iversen; Storyboarded by : Aaron Springer (director)	April 22, 2010	223–715	4.76
135	9	"Back to the Past"	Alan Smart	Written by : Casey Alexander, Zeus Cervas, and Dani Michaeli; Storyboarded by : Casey Alexander and Zeus Cervas (directors)	February 15, 2010	223–710	3.63
135	9	"The Bad Guy Club for Villains"	Alan Smart	Written by : Casey Alexander, Zeus Cervas, and Dani Michaeli; Storyboarded by : Casey Alexander and Zeus Cervas (directors)	February 15, 2010	223–724	3.63
136	10	"A Day Without Tears"	Tom Yasumi	Written by : Aaron Springer and Steven Banks; Storyboarded by : Aaron Springer (director)	March 22, 2010	223–721	3.64
136	10	"Summer Job"	Alan Smart	Written by : Casey Alexander, Zeus Cervas, and Derek Iversen; Storyboarded by : Casey Alexander and Zeus Cervas (directors)	March 23, 2010	223–716	3.27
137	11	"One Coarse Meal"	Andrew Overtoom	Written by : Casey Alexander, Zeus Cervas, and Mr. Lawrence; Storyboarded by : Casey Alexander and Zeus Cervas (directors)	March 25, 2010	223–722	4.19
137	11	"Gary in Love"	Andrew Overtoom	Written by : Casey Alexander, Zeus Cervas, and Derek Iversen; Storyboarded by : Casey Alexander and Zeus Cervas (directors)	February 6, 2010	223–720	5.52
138	12	"The Play's the Thing"	Tom Yasumi	Written by : Luke Brookshier, Nate Cash, and Steven Banks; Storyboarded by : Luke Brookshier and Nate Cash (directors)	March 26, 2010	223–723	3.25
138	12	"Rodeo Daze"	Alan Smart	Written by : Luke Brookshier, Nate Cash, and Richard Pursel; Storyboarded by : Luke Brookshier and Nate Cash (directors)	February 6, 2010	223–719	5.52
139	13	"Gramma's Secret Recipe"	Alan Smart	Written by : Aaron Springer and Dani Michaeli; Storyboarded by : Aaron Springer (director)	July 6, 2010	223–725	3.62
139	13	"The Cent of Money"	Andrew Overtoom	Written by : Casey Alexander, Zeus Cervas, and Dani Michaeli; Storyboarded by : Casey Alexander and Zeus Cervas (directors)	July 7, 2010	223–731	2.49
Legends of Bikini Bottom
140	14	"The Monster Who Came to Bikini Bottom"	Andrew Overtoom	Written by : Aaron Springer and Dani Michaeli; Storyboarded by : Aaron Springer (director)	January 28, 2011 (Note: This episode was first released on the SpongeBob SquarePants: Legends of Bikini Bottom DVD on November 16, 2010.)	223–743	6.05
140	14	"Welcome to the Bikini Bottom Triangle"	Alan Smart	Written by : Luke Brookshier, Nate Cash, and Dani Michaeli; Storyboarded by : Luke Brookshier and Nate Cash (directors)	January 28, 2011	223–742	6.05
141	15	"The Curse of the Hex"	Tom Yasumi	Written by : Aaron Springer and Richard Pursel; Storyboarded by : Aaron Springer (director)	June 11, 2011	223–745	4.45
141	15	"The Main Drain"	Alan Smart	Written by : Luke Brookshier, Nate Cash, and Mr. Lawrence; Storyboarded by : Luke Brookshier and Nate Cash (directors)	January 28, 2011	223–746	6.00
142	16	"Trenchbillies"	Andrew Overtoom	Written by : Aaron Springer and Richard Pursel; Storyboarded by : Aaron Springer (director)	January 27, 2011 (Facebook); January 29, 2011 (Nickelodeon)	223–741	6.55
142	16	"Sponge-Cano!"	Tom Yasumi	Written by : Casey Alexander, Zeus Cervas, and Derek Iversen; Storyboarded by : Casey Alexander and Zeus Cervas (directors)	January 28, 2011	223–744	6.00
Episodes 17–26
143	17	"The Great Patty Caper"	Tom Yasumi and Alan Smart	Written by : Casey Alexander, Zeus Cervas, Steven Banks, and Dani Michaeli; Storyboarded by : Casey Alexander and Zeus Cervas (directors)	November 11, 2010	223–727	6.10
143	17	"The Great Patty Caper"	Tom Yasumi and Alan Smart	Written by : Casey Alexander, Zeus Cervas, Steven Banks, and Dani Michaeli; Storyboarded by : Casey Alexander and Zeus Cervas (directors)	November 11, 2010	223–728	6.10
144	18	"That Sinking Feeling"	Andrew Overtoom	Written by : Luke Brookshier, Nate Cash, and Mr. Lawrence; Storyboarded by : Luke Brookshier and Nate Cash (directors)	July 8, 2010	223–729	2.72
144	18	"Karate Star"	Tom Yasumi	Written by : Casey Alexander, Zeus Cervas, and Derek Iversen; Storyboarded by : Casey Alexander and Zeus Cervas (directors)	July 9, 2010	223–730	3.46
145	19	"Buried in Time"	Andrew Overtoom	Written by : Nate Cash, Sean Charmatz, and Mr. Lawrence; Storyboarded by : Nate Cash and Sean Charmatz (directors)	September 18, 2010	223–726	4.74
145	19	"Enchanted Tiki Dreams"	Alan Smart	Written by : Aaron Springer, Sean Charmatz, and Richard Pursel; Storyboarded by : Aaron Springer and Sean Charmatz (directors)	June 19, 2010	223–732	3.72
146	20	"The Abrasive Side"	Tom Yasumi	Written by : Luke Brookshier, Nate Cash, and Mr. Lawrence; Storyboarded by : Luke Brookshier and Nate Cash (directors)	November 27, 2010	223–734	4.54
146	20	"Earworm"	Alan Smart	Written by : Casey Alexander, Zeus Cervas, and Derek Iversen; Storyboarded by : Casey Alexander and Zeus Cervas (directors)	November 27, 2010	223–733	4.54
147	21	"Hide and Then What Happens?"	Andrew Overtoom	Written by : Aaron Springer and Dani Michaeli; Storyboarded by : Aaron Springer (director)	August 9, 2010	223–735	4.38
147	21	"Shellback Shenanigans"	Andrew Overtoom	Written by : Aaron Springer and Richard Pursel; Storyboarded by : Aaron Springer (director)	September 18, 2010	223–738	4.74
148	22	"The Masterpiece"	Tom Yasumi	Written by : Casey Alexander, Zeus Cervas, and Steven Banks; Storyboarded by : Casey Alexander and Zeus Cervas (directors)	October 2, 2010	223–736	3.99
148	22	"Whelk Attack"	Tom Yasumi	Written by : Luke Brookshier, Nate Cash, and Richard Pursel; Storyboarded by : Luke Brookshier and Nate Cash (directors)	October 2, 2010	223–739	3.99
149	23	"You Don't Know Sponge"	Alan Smart	Written by : Luke Brookshier, Nate Cash, and Derek Iversen; Storyboarded by : Luke Brookshier and Nate Cash (directors)	August 9, 2010	223–737	4.38
149	23	"Tunnel of Glove"	Alan Smart	Written by : Casey Alexander, Zeus Cervas, and Dani Michaeli; Storyboarded by : Casey Alexander and Zeus Cervas (directors)	February 12, 2011	223–740	5.01
150	24	"Krusty Dogs"	Tom Yasumi	Written by : Aaron Springer and Dani Michaeli; Storyboarded by : Aaron Springer (director)	October 9, 2010	223–748	4.58
150	24	"The Wreck of the Mauna Loa"	Andrew Overtoom	Written by : Casey Alexander, Zeus Cervas, and Derek Iversen; Storyboarded by : Casey Alexander and Zeus Cervas (directors)	October 9, 2010	223–747	4.58
151	25	"New Fish in Town"	Andrew Overtoom	Written by : Aaron Springer and Derek Iversen; Storyboarded by : Aaron Springer (director)	January 15, 2011	223–751	4.71
151	25	"Love That Squid"	Alan Smart	Written by : Casey Alexander, Zeus Cervas, Sean Charmatz, and Richard Pursel; Storyboarded by : Casey Alexander, Zeus Cervas, and Sean Charmatz (directors)	February 12, 2011	223–749	5.01
152	26	"Big Sister Sam"	Tom Yasumi	Written by : Casey Alexander, Zeus Cervas, and Richard Pursel; Storyboarded by : Casey Alexander and Zeus Cervas (directors)	January 15, 2011	223–752	4.71
152	26	"Perfect Chemistry"	Alan Smart	Written by : Luke Brookshier, Nate Cash, and Mr. Lawrence; Storyboarded by : Luke Brookshier and Nate Cash (directors)	February 26, 2011	223–750	4.78

=== Season 8 (2011–12) ===
The eighth season of SpongeBob SquarePants consists of 26 episodes (47 segments), which are ordered below by packaging number and not their original broadcast order.

No. overall	No. in season	Title	Animation direction by	Written by	Original release date	Prod. code	U.S. viewers (millions)
153	1	"Accidents Will Happen"	Andrew Overtoom	Written by : Luke Brookshier, Nate Cash, and Dani Michaeli; Storyboarded by : Luke Brookshier and Nate Cash (directors)	July 18, 2011	268–801	3.80
153	1	"The Other Patty"	Andrew Overtoom	Written by : Luke Brookshier, Nate Cash, and Mr. Lawrence; Storyboarded by : Luke Brookshier and Nate Cash (directors)	June 25, 2011	268–804	3.82
154	2	"Drive Thru"	Tom Yasumi	Written by : Aaron Springer and Dani Michaeli; Storyboarded by : Aaron Springer (director)	July 19, 2011	268–807	3.68
154	2	"The Hot Shot"	Alan Smart	Written by : Aaron Springer and Derek Iversen; Storyboarded by : Aaron Springer (director)	June 18, 2011	268–802	3.49
155	3	"A Friendly Game"	Tom Yasumi	Written by : Casey Alexander, Zeus Cervas, and Steven Banks; Storyboarded by : Casey Alexander and Zeus Cervas (directors)	March 26, 2011	268–803	4.55
155	3	"Sentimental Sponge"	Alan Smart	Written by : Luke Brookshier, Nate Cash, and Mr. Lawrence; Storyboarded by : Luke Brookshier and Nate Cash (directors)	April 2, 2011	268–808	3.27 (Note: Due to airing as a part of Nickelodeon's Countdown to the Kids' Choice Awards 2011 event, the exact ratings for this episode went undocumented. The ratings listed here are what the 7:30pm half-hour of this event received.)
156	4	"Frozen Face-Off"	Andrew Overtoom and Tom Yasumi	Written by : Casey Alexander, Zeus Cervas, Derek Iversen, Dani Michaeli, and Richard Pursel; Storyboarded by : Casey Alexander and Zeus Cervas (directors)	July 15, 2011	268–805	5.76
156	4	"Frozen Face-Off"	Andrew Overtoom and Tom Yasumi	Written by : Casey Alexander, Zeus Cervas, Derek Iversen, Dani Michaeli, and Richard Pursel; Storyboarded by : Casey Alexander and Zeus Cervas (directors)	July 15, 2011	268–806	5.76
157	5	"Squidward's School for Grown-Ups"	Alan Smart	Written by : Aaron Springer, Sean Charmatz, and Richard Pursel; Storyboarded by : Aaron Springer and Sean Charmatz (directors)	June 4, 2011	268–809	5.02
157	5	"Oral Report"	Alan Smart	Written by : Casey Alexander, Zeus Cervas, and Dani Michaeli; Storyboarded by : Casey Alexander and Zeus Cervas (directors)	March 26, 2011	268–811	4.55
158	6	"Sweet and Sour Squid"	Tom Yasumi	Written by : Aaron Springer and Mr. Lawrence; Storyboarded by : Aaron Springer (director)	July 20, 2011	268–812	3.58
158	6	"The Googly Artiste"	Andrew Overtoom	Written by : Luke Brookshier, Nate Cash, and Derek Iversen; Storyboarded by : Luke Brookshier and Nate Cash (directors)	July 21, 2011	268–810	3.61
159	7	"A SquarePants Family Vacation"	Andrew Overtoom and Tom Yasumi	Written by : Aaron Springer, Sean Charmatz, and Derek Iversen; Storyboarded by : Aaron Springer and Sean Charmatz (directors)	November 11, 2011 (Note: This episode was first released on the SpongeBob's Runaway Roadtrip DVD on September 20, 2011.)	268–815A	3.57
159	7	"A SquarePants Family Vacation"	Andrew Overtoom and Tom Yasumi	Written by : Aaron Springer, Sean Charmatz, and Derek Iversen; Storyboarded by : Aaron Springer and Sean Charmatz (directors)	November 11, 2011	268–815B	3.57
160	8	"Patrick's Staycation"	Andrew Overtoom	Written by : Luke Brookshier, Nate Cash, Sean Charmatz, and Dani Michaeli; Storyboarded by : Luke Brookshier, Nate Cash, and Sean Charmatz (directors)	November 8, 2011	268–813	3.01
160	8	"Walking the Plankton"	Alan Smart	Written by : Casey Alexander, Zeus Cervas, and Mr. Lawrence; Storyboarded by : Casey Alexander and Zeus Cervas (directors)	November 7, 2011	268–816	2.97
161	9	"Mooncation"	Alan Smart	Written by : Sean Charmatz, Vincent Waller, Steven Banks; Storyboarded by : Sean Charmatz and Vincent Waller (directors)	November 10, 2011	268–818	2.83
161	9	"Mr. Krabs Takes a Vacation"	Tom Yasumi	Written by : Luke Brookshier, Marc Ceccarelli, Sean Charmatz, and Steven Banks; Storyboarded by : Luke Brookshier, Marc Ceccarelli, and Sean Charmatz (directors)	November 9, 2011	268–817	3.14
162	10	"Ghoul Fools"	Andrew Overtoom and Tom Yasumi	Written by : Luke Brookshier, Marc Ceccarelli, and Derek Iversen; Storyboarded by : Luke Brookshier and Marc Ceccarelli (directors)	October 21, 2011	268–819	3.91
162	10	"Ghoul Fools"	Andrew Overtoom and Tom Yasumi	Written by : Luke Brookshier, Marc Ceccarelli, and Derek Iversen; Storyboarded by : Luke Brookshier and Marc Ceccarelli (directors)	October 21, 2011	268–820	3.91
163	11	"Mermaid Man Begins"	Alan Smart	Written by : Casey Alexander, Zeus Cervas, Sean Charmatz, and Richard Pursel; Storyboarded by : Casey Alexander, Zeus Cervas, and Sean Charmatz (directors)	September 23, 2011	268–822	2.65
163	11	"Plankton's Good Eye"	Tom Yasumi	Written by : Luke Brookshier, Marc Cecarrelli, and Derek Iversen; Storyboarded by : Luke Brookshier and Marc Ceccarelli (directors)	September 23, 2011	268–825	2.65
164	12	"Barnacle Face"	Andrew Overtoom	Written by : Aaron Springer, Andrew Goodman, and Dani Michaeli; Storyboarded by : Aaron Springer (director)	September 16, 2011	268–821	4.39
164	12	"Pet Sitter Pat"	Tom Yasumi	Written by : Casey Alexander, Zeus Cervas, and Richard Pursel; Storyboarded by : Casey Alexander and Zeus Cervas (directors)	September 16, 2011	268–835	4.39
165	13	"House Sittin' for Sandy"	Alan Smart	Written by : Aaron Springer, Sean Charmatz, and Derek Iversen; Storyboarded by : Aaron Springer (director)	September 30, 2011	268–823	3.33
165	13	"Smoothe Jazz at Bikini Bottom"	Andrew Overtoom	Written by : Casey Alexander, Zeus Cervas, and Richard Pursel; Storyboarded by : Casey Alexander and Zeus Cervas (directors)	September 30, 2011	268–826	3.33
166	14	"Bubble Troubles"	Andrew Overtoom	Written by : Luke Brookshier, Marc Ceccarelli, and Derek Iversen; Storyboarded by : Luke Brookshier and Marc Ceccarelli (directors)	November 25, 2011	268–829	3.28
166	14	"The Way of the Sponge"	Tom Yasumi	Written by : Casey Alexander, Zeus Cervas, Derek Iversen, and Andrew Goodman; Storyboarded by : Casey Alexander and Zeus Cervas (directors)	November 25, 2011	268–830	3.28
167	15	"The Krabby Patty That Ate Bikini Bottom"	Alan Smart	Written by : Aaron Springer and Dani Michaeli; Storyboarded by : Aaron Springer (director)	November 25, 2011	268–828	3.27
167	15	"Bubble Buddy Returns"	Alan Smart	Written by : Luke Brookshier, Marc Ceccarelli, and Mr. Lawrence; Storyboarded by : Luke Brookshier and Marc Ceccarelli (directors)	November 25, 2011	268–824	3.27
168	16	"Restraining SpongeBob"	Tom Yasumi	Written by : Sean Charmatz, Vincent Waller, and Paul Tibbitt; Storyboarded by : Sean Charmatz and Vincent Waller (directors)	April 2, 2012	268–814A 268–814B	2.04
168	16	"Fiasco!"	Tom Yasumi	Written by : Casey Alexander, Zeus Cervas, and Mr. Lawrence; Storyboarded by : Casey Alexander and Zeus Cervas (directors)	April 5, 2012	268–834	1.69
169	17	"Are You Happy Now?"	Andrew Overtoom	Written by : Luke Brookshier, Marc Ceccarelli, and Dani Michaeli; Storyboarded by : Luke Brookshier and Marc Ceccarelli (directors)	March 31, 2012	268–833	4.12
169	17	"Planet of the Jellyfish"	Tom Yasumi	Written by : Luke Brookshier, Marc Ceccarelli, and Mr. Lawrence; Storyboarded by : Luke Brookshier and Marc Ceccarelli (directors)	March 31, 2012	268–827	4.12
170	18	"Free Samples"	Andrew Overtoom	Written by : Casey Alexander, Zeus Cervas, and Dani Michaeli; Storyboarded by : Casey Alexander and Zeus Cervas (directors)	April 6, 2012	268–839	1.67
170	18	"Home Sweet Rubble"	Andrew Overtoom	Written by : Casey Alexander, Zeus Cervas, and Richard Pursel; Storyboarded by : Casey Alexander and Zeus Cervas (directors)	April 4, 2012	268–843	2.40
171	19	"Karen 2.0"	Alan Smart	Written by : Casey Alexander, Zeus Cervas, and Richard Pursel; Storyboarded by : Casey Alexander and Zeus Cervas (directors)	April 13, 2012	268–846	2.25
171	19	"InSPONGEiac"	Alan Smart	Written by : Casey Alexander, Zeus Cervas, and Mr. Lawrence; Storyboarded by : Casey Alexander and Zeus Cervas (directors)	April 9, 2012	268–837	2.02
172	20	"Face Freeze!"	Andrew Overtoom	Written by : Casey Alexander, Zeus Cervas, and Mr. Lawrence; Storyboarded by : Casey Alexander and Zeus Cervas (directors)	July 21, 2012	268–848	3.65
172	20	"Glove World R.I.P."	Tom Yasumi	Written by : Aaron Springer and Dani Michaeli; Storyboarded by : Aaron Springer (director)	April 3, 2012	268–844	2.71
173	21	"Squiditis"	Tom Yasumi	Written by : Aaron Springer and Derek Iversen; Storyboarded by : Aaron Springer (director)	April 11, 2012	268–849	2.27
173	21	"Demolition Doofus"	Alan Smart	Written by : Luke Brookshier, Marc Ceccarelli, and Derek Iversen; Storyboarded by : Luke Brookshier and Marc Ceccarelli (directors)	July 21, 2012	268–845	3.65
174	22	"Treats!"	Alan Smart	Written by : Aaron Springer and Dani Michaeli; Storyboarded by : Aaron Springer (director)	April 10, 2012	268–847	2.15
174	22	"For Here or to Go"	Andrew Overtoom	Written by : Luke Brookshier, Marc Ceccarelli, and Steven Banks; Storyboarded by : Luke Brookshier and Marc Ceccarelli (directors)	April 12, 2012	268–840	2.52
175	23	"It's a SpongeBob Christmas!"	Mark Caballero and Seamus Walsh	Written by : Luke Brookshier, Marc Ceccarelli, Derek Iversen, and Mr. Lawrence; Storyboarded by : Luke Brookshier and Marc Ceccarelli (directors)	November 23, 2012 (Note: This episode was first released in It's a Spongebob Christmas! DVD on November 6, 2012.)	268–841	3.63; 4.61
175	23	"It's a SpongeBob Christmas!"	Mark Caballero and Seamus Walsh	Written by : Luke Brookshier, Marc Ceccarelli, Derek Iversen, and Mr. Lawrence; Storyboarded by : Luke Brookshier and Marc Ceccarelli (directors)	November 23, 2012	268–842	3.63; 4.61
176	24	"Super Evil Aquatic Villain Team Up is Go!"	Alan Smart	Written by : Aaron Springer and Dani Michaeli; Storyboarded by : Aaron Springer (director)	October 14, 2012	268–836	2.28
176	24	"Chum Fricassee"	Tom Yasumi	Written by : Casey Alexander, Zeus Cervas, and Richard Pursel; Storyboarded by : Casey Alexander and Zeus Cervas (directors)	October 21, 2012	268–850	2.30
177	25	"The Good Krabby Name"	Alan Smart	Written by : Luke Brookshier, Marc Ceccarelli, and Derek Iversen; Storyboarded by : Luke Brookshier and Marc Ceccarelli (directors)	September 3, 2012	268–851	3.36
177	25	"Move It or Lose It"	Andrew Overtoom	Written by : Casey Alexander, Zeus Cervas, and Mr. Lawrence; Storyboarded by : Casey Alexander and Zeus Cervas (directors)	October 21, 2012	268–838	2.30
178	26	"Hello Bikini Bottom!"	Alan Smart, Andrew Overtoom, and Tom Yasumi	Written by : Aaron Springer, Sean Charmatz, and Dani Michaeli; Storyboarded by : Aaron Springer and Sean Charmatz (directors)	October 8, 2012	268–831	2.76
178	26	"Hello Bikini Bottom!"	Alan Smart, Andrew Overtoom, and Tom Yasumi	Written by : Aaron Springer, Sean Charmatz, and Dani Michaeli; Storyboarded by : Aaron Springer and Sean Charmatz (directors)	October 8, 2012	268–832	2.76

=== Season 9 (2012–17) ===
The ninth season of SpongeBob SquarePants consists of 26 episodes (49 segments), which are ordered below by packaging number and not their original broadcast order.

No. overall	No. in season	Title	Directed by (Note: From #179A "Extreme Spots" to #189 "SpongeBob, You're Fired", only animation directors are credited. Following the series' transition from a board-driven format to a script-driven one with #190A "Lost in Bikini Bottom," storyboard supervisors (later referred to as supervising directors beginning with #197A "Mall Girl Pearl") are also listed in the opening and end credits.)	Written by	Original release date	Prod. code	U.S. viewers (millions)
Part 1
179	1	"Extreme Spots"	Tom Yasumi	Written by : Luke Brookshier, Marc Ceccarelli, and Derek Iversen; Storyboarded by : Luke Brookshier and Marc Ceccarelli (directors)	July 21, 2012	325–902	3.65
179	1	"Squirrel Record"	Alan Smart	Written by : Luke Brookshier, Marc Ceccarelli, and Derek Iversen; Storyboarded by : Luke Brookshier and Marc Ceccarelli (directors)	July 21, 2012	325–901	3.65
180	2	"Patrick-Man!"	Alan Smart	Written by : Casey Alexander, Zeus Cervas, and Derek Iversen; Storyboarded by : Casey Alexander and Zeus Cervas (directors)	October 27, 2012	325–907	3.78
180	2	"Gary's New Toy"	Tom Yasumi	Written by : Marc Ceccarelli and Derek Iversen; Storyboarded by : Marc Ceccarelli (directors)	October 14, 2012	325–906	2.28
181	3	"License to Milkshake"	Tom Yasumi	Written by : Casey Alexander, Zeus Cervas, and Mr. Lawrence; Storyboarded by : Casey Alexander and Zeus Cervas (directors)	September 7, 2012	325–915	3.13
181	3	"Squid Baby"	Alan Smart	Written by : Casey Alexander, Zeus Cervas, and Mr. Lawrence; Storyboarded by : Casey Alexander and Zeus Cervas (directors)	September 3, 2012	325–905	3.36
182	4	"Little Yellow Book"	Alan Smart	Written by : Luke Brookshier, Marc Ceccarelli, and Derek Iversen; Storyboarded by : Luke Brookshier and Marc Ceccarelli (directors)	March 2, 2013	325–916	4.73
182	4	"Bumper to Bumper"	Alan Smart	Written by : Casey Alexander, Zeus Cervas, and Mr. Lawrence; Storyboarded by : Casey Alexander and Zeus Cervas (directors)	November 17, 2012	325–904	4.01
183	5	"Eek, an Urchin!"	Alan Smart	Written by : Marc Ceccarelli, Luke Brookshier, and Mr. Lawrence; Storyboarded by : Marc Ceccarelli and Luke Brookshier (directors)	October 27, 2012	325–921	3.78
183	5	"Squid Defense"	Tom Yasumi	Written by : Casey Alexander, Zeus Cervas, Blake Lemons, and Derek Iversen; Storyboarded by : Casey Alexander, Zeus Cervas and Blake Lemons (directors)	January 1, 2013	325–911	3.70
184	6	"Jailbreak!"	Alan Smart	Written by : Marc Ceccarelli, Luke Brookshier, and Mr. Lawrence; Storyboarded by : Marc Ceccarelli and Luke Brookshier (directors)	March 16, 2013	325–909	3.81
184	6	"Evil Spatula"	Alan Smart and Tom Yasumi	Written by : Casey Alexander, Zeus Cervas, Blake Lemons, and Andrew Goodman; Storyboarded by : Casey Alexander, Zeus Cervas and Blake Lemons (directors)	March 9, 2013	325–924	4.04
185	7	"It Came from Goo Lagoon"	Alan Smart and Tom Yasumi	Written by : Marc Ceccarelli, Luke Brookshier, Derek Iversen, and Mr. Lawrence; Storyboarded by : Marc Ceccarelli and Luke Brookshier (directors)	February 17, 2014	325–917	4.04
185	7	"It Came from Goo Lagoon"	Alan Smart and Tom Yasumi	Written by : Marc Ceccarelli, Luke Brookshier, Derek Iversen, and Mr. Lawrence; Storyboarded by : Marc Ceccarelli and Luke Brookshier (directors)	February 17, 2014	325–918	4.04
186	8	"Safe Deposit Krabs"	Alan Smart	Written by : Casey Alexander, Zeus Cervas, Blake Lemons, and Derek Iversen; Storyboarded by : Casey Alexander, Zeus Cervas and Blake Lemons (directors)	May 25, 2013	325–931	4.18
186	8	"Plankton's Pet"	Alan Smart and Tom Yasumi	Written by : Marc Ceccarelli, Luke Brookshier, and Mr. Lawrence; Storyboarded by : Marc Ceccarelli and Luke Brookshier, (directors)	January 19, 2013	325–934	4.37
187	9	"Don't Look Now"	Tom Yasumi	Written by : Marc Ceccarelli, Luke Brookshier, and Mr. Lawrence; Storyboarded by : Marc Ceccarelli and Luke Brookshier, (directors)	October 14, 2013	325–938	3.42
187	9	"Séance Shméance"	Alan Smart and Tom Yasumi	Written by : Casey Alexander, Zeus Cervas, and Mr. Lawrence; Storyboarded by : Casey Alexander and Zeus Cervas (directors)	October 14, 2013	325–937	3.42
188	10	"Kenny the Cat"	Tom Yasumi	Written by : Casey Alexander, Zeus Cervas, Blake Lemons, and Mr. Lawrence; Storyboarded by : Casey Alexander, Zeus Cervas and Blake Lemons (directors)	March 29, 2014	325–927	4.33
188	10	"Yeti Krabs"	Alan Smart	Written by : Casey Alexander, Zeus Cervas, and Mr. Lawrence; Storyboarded by : Casey Alexander and Zeus Cervas (directors)	March 29, 2015	325–940	2.25
189	11	"SpongeBob, You're Fired"	Alan Smart and Tom Yasumi	Written by : Marc Ceccarelli, Luke Brookshier, and Mr. Lawrence; Storyboarded by : Marc Ceccarelli and Luke Brookshier (directors)	November 11, 2013	325–941	5.19
189	11	"SpongeBob, You're Fired"	Alan Smart and Tom Yasumi	Written by : Marc Ceccarelli, Luke Brookshier, and Mr. Lawrence; Storyboarded by : Marc Ceccarelli and Luke Brookshier (directors)	November 11, 2013	325–942	5.19
Part 2
190	12	"Lost in Bikini Bottom"	Alan Smart and Tom Yasumi (animation), Sherm Cohen (storyboard supervision)	Written by : Jack Pendarvis; Storyboarded by : Bob Camp	July 16, 2015	325–939	2.76
190	12	"Tutor Sauce"	Alan Smart and Tom Yasumi (animation), Sherm Cohen (storyboard supervision)	Written by : Jack Pendarvis; Storyboarded by : Fred Osmond	July 16, 2015	325–935	2.76
191	13	"Squid Plus One"	Alan Smart and Tom Yasumi (animation), Dave Cunningham (storyboard supervision)	Written by : Kyle McCulloch and Jack Pendarvis; Storyboarded by : Fred Osmond	September 7, 2015	325–945	1.98
191	13	"The Executive Treatment"	Alan Smart and Tom Yasumi (animation), Sherm Cohen (storyboard supervision)	Written by : Jack Pendarvis; Storyboarded by : Fred Osmond	September 7, 2015	325–923	1.98
192	14	"Company Picnic"	Alan Smart and Tom Yasumi (animation), Sherm Cohen (storyboard supervision)	Written by : Kyle McCulloch and Jack Pendarvis; Storyboarded by : Lynne Naylor	September 25, 2015	325–919	1.61
192	14	"Pull Up a Barrel"	Alan Smart and Tom Yasumi (animation), Sherm Cohen (storyboard supervision)	Written by : Jack Pendarvis; Storyboarded by : Bob Camp	September 18, 2015	325–949	2.09
193	15	"Sanctuary!"	Alan Smart and Tom Yasumi (animation), Dave Cunningham (storyboard supervision)	Written by : Kyle McCulloch; Storyboarded by : Fred Osmond	October 16, 2015	325–933	1.28
193	15	"What's Eating Patrick?"	Alan Smart and Tom Yasumi (animation), Sherm Cohen (storyboard supervision)	Written by : Kyle McCulloch and Jack Pendarvis; Storyboarded by : Joe Wierenga	October 2, 2015	325–953	1.77
194	16	"Patrick! The Game"	Alan Smart and Tom Yasumi (animation), Sherm Cohen (storyboard supervision)	Written by : Kyle McCulloch; Storyboarded by : Fred Osmond	November 11, 2015	325–959	2.05
194	16	"The Sewers of Bikini Bottom"	Alan Smart and Tom Yasumi (animation), Dave Cunningham (storyboard supervision)	Written by : Kaz and Derek Iversen; Storyboarded by : Lynne Naylor	November 11, 2015	325–926	2.05
195	17	"SpongeBob LongPants"	Alan Smart and Tom Yasumi (animation), Dave Cunningham (storyboard supervision)	Written by : Kaz; Storyboarded by : Lynne Naylor	February 15, 2016	325–957	2.93
195	17	"Larry's Gym"	Alan Smart and Tom Yasumi (animation), Sherm Cohen (storyboard supervision)	Written by : Jack Pendarvis; Storyboarded by : Fred Osmond	February 15, 2016	325–912	2.93
196	18	"The Fish Bowl"	Alan Smart and Tom Yasumi (animation), Dave Cunningham (storyboard supervision)	Written by : Kyle McCulloch and Jack Pendarvis; Storyboarded by : John Trabbic	May 2, 2016	325–928	1.96
196	18	"Married to Money"	Alan Smart and Tom Yasumi (animation), Sherm Cohen (storyboard supervision)	Written by : Josh Androsky and Daniel Dominguez; Storyboarded by : Lynne Naylor	May 3, 2016	325–963	1.76
197	19	"Mall Girl Pearl"	Alan Smart and Tom Yasumi (animation), Sherm Cohen (supervising)	Written by : Clare O'Kane; Storyboarded by : John Trabbic	March 12, 2016	325–964	3.11
197	19	"Two Thumbs Down"	Alan Smart and Tom Yasumi (animation), Dave Cunningham (supervising)	Written by : Kyle McCulloch; Storyboarded by : Fred Osmond	March 12, 2016	325–956	3.11
198	20	"Sharks vs. Pods"	Tom Yasumi (animation), Sherm Cohen (supervising)	Written by : Solomon Georgio; Storyboarded by : Shellie O'Brien	May 4, 2016	325–946	1.81
198	20	"CopyBob DittoPants"	Alan Smart (animation), Dave Cunningham (supervising)	Written by : Kaz; Storyboarded by : Howie Perry	May 5, 2016	325–961	1.71
199	21	"Sold!"	Alan Smart and Tom Yasumi (animation), Dave Cunningham (supervising)	Written by : Kyle McCulloch and Kaz; Storyboarded by : Shellie O'Brien	May 6, 2016	325–969	1.80
199	21	"Lame and Fortune"	Alan Smart and Tom Yasumi (animation), Sherm Cohen (supervising)	Written by : Mr. Lawrence; Storyboarded by : Chong Lee	July 11, 2016	325–968	1.96
200	22	"Goodbye, Krabby Patty?"	Alan Smart and Tom Yasumi (animation), Sherm Cohen and Dave Cunningham (supervising)	Written by : Kyle McCulloch; Storyboarded by : Fred Osmond	February 20, 2017	325–972	2.67
200	22	"Goodbye, Krabby Patty?"	Alan Smart and Tom Yasumi (animation), Sherm Cohen and Dave Cunningham (supervising)	Written by : Kyle McCulloch; Storyboarded by : Fred Osmond	February 20, 2017	325–973	2.67
201	23	"Sandy's Nutmare"	Alan Smart and Tom Yasumi (animation), Sherm Cohen (supervising)	Written by : Andrew Goodman; Storyboarded by : John Trabbic	July 12, 2016	325–966	2.00
201	23	"Bulletin Board"	Alan Smart and Tom Yasumi (animation), Dave Cunningham (supervising)	Written by : Jack Pendarvis; Storyboarded by : Ed Baker	October 1, 2016	325–958	2.11
202	24	"Food Con Castaways"	Alan Smart (animation), Sherm Cohen (supervising)	Written by : Daniel Dominguez and Josh Androsky; Storyboarded by : Chris Allison and Ryan Kramer	July 13, 2016	325–967	2.02
202	24	"Snail Mail"	Tom Yasumi (animation), Dave Cunningham (supervising)	Written by : Clare O'Kane; Storyboarded by : Chong Lee	October 22, 2016	325–970	1.67
203	25	"Pineapple Invasion"	Alan Smart (animation), Sherm Cohen (supervising)	Written by : Kaz; Storyboarded by : Fred Osmond	July 14, 2016	325–954	2.24
203	25	"Salsa Imbecilicus"	Tom Yasumi (animation), Dave Cunningham (supervising)	Written by : Kaz; Storyboarded by : Brian Morante	July 15, 2016	325–971	1.83
204	26	"Mutiny on the Krusty"	Tom Yasumi (animation), Sherm Cohem (supervising)	Written by : Kaz; Storyboarded by : Fred Osmond	October 8, 2016	325–962	1.94
204	26	"The Whole Tooth"	Alan Smart (animation), Dave Cunningham (supervising)	Written by : Kyle McCulloch; Storyboarded by : John Trabbic	December 3, 2016	325–965	2.12

=== Season 10 (2016–17) ===
The tenth season of SpongeBob SquarePants consists of 11 episodes (22 segments), which are ordered below by packaging number and not their original broadcast order. It is the shortest season, lacking the usual 26 episode length.

No. overall	No. in season	Title	Directed by (Note: Adam Paloian did not use the supervising director title in his episodes at first. Instead, he used the title "storyboard supervisor" up until episode 213a, where he is credited as a supervising director from then on.)	Written by	Original release date	Prod. code	U.S. viewers (millions)
205	1	"Whirly Brains"	Bob Jaques (animation), Sherm Cohen (supervising)	Written by : Mr. Lawrence; Storyboarded by : Fred Osmond	October 15, 2016	325–1001	1.77
205	1	"Mermaid Pants"	Alan Smart (animation), Dave Cunningham (supervising)	Written by : Kaz; Storyboarded by : John Trabbic	October 29, 2016	325–1002	2.17
206	2	"Unreal Estate"	Tom Yasumi (animation), Adam Paloian (storyboard supervision)	Written by : Ben Gruber; Storyboarded by : Brian Morante	June 3, 2017	325–1004	1.69
206	2	"Code Yellow"	Tom Yasumi (animation), Dave Cunningham (supervising)	Written by : Andrew Goodman; Storyboarded by : John Trabbic	June 3, 2017	325–1005	1.69
207	3	"Mimic Madness"	Bob Jaques (animation), Adam Paloian (storyboard supervision)	Written by : Mr. Lawrence; Storyboarded by : Brian Morante	February 25, 2017	325–1007	2.12
207	3	"House Worming"	Alan Smart (animation), Sherm Cohen (supervising)	Written by : Richard Pursel; Storyboarded by : Fred Osmond	February 25, 2017	325–1003	2.12
208	4	"Snooze You Lose"	Alan Smart (animation), Adam Paloian (supervising)	Written by : Kaz; Storyboarded by : Fred Osmond	March 4, 2017	325–1008	2.12
208	4	"Krusty Katering"	Tom Yasumi (animation), Dave Cunningham (supervising)	Written by : Ben Gruber; Storyboarded by : John Trabbic	March 4, 2017	325–1010	2.12
209	5	"SpongeBob's Place"	Tom Yasumi (animation), Adam Paloian (storyboard supervision)	Written by : Kaz; Storyboarded by : Kelly Armstrong	March 11, 2017	325–1006	2.27
209	5	"Plankton Gets the Boot"	Tom Yasumi (animation), Sherm Cohen (supervising)	Written by : Ben Gruber; Storyboarded by : Fred Osmond	March 11, 2017	325–1011	2.27
210	6	"Life Insurance"	Bob Jaques (animation), Adam Paloian (storyboard supervision)	Written by : Kaz; Storyboarded by : Brian Morante	March 18, 2017	325–1012	2.13
210	6	"Burst Your Bubble"	Alan Smart (animation), Dave Cunningham (supervising)	Written by : Andrew Goodman; Storyboarded by : John Trabbic	March 18, 2017	325–1013	2.13
211	7	"Plankton Retires"	Bob Jaques (timing), (Note: So far, this is the only episode that has not used the animation director credit. Instead, Jaques is credited as a timing director.) Sherm Cohen (supervising)	Written by : Mr. Lawrence; Storyboarded by : Fred Osmond	March 25, 2017	325–1014	2.07
211	7	"Trident Trouble"	Tom Yasumi (animation), Dave Cunningham (supervising)	Written by : Ben Gruber; Storyboarded by : John Trabbic	March 25, 2017	325–1015	2.07
212	8	"The Incredible Shrinking Sponge"	Alan Smart (animation), Adam Paloian (storyboard supervision)	Written by : Mr. Lawrence; Storyboarded by : Brian Morante	December 2, 2017	325–1018	1.83
212	8	"Sportz?"	Bob Jaques (animation), Dave Cunningham (supervising)	Written by : Andrew Goodman; Storyboarded by : John Trabbic	July 16, 2017	325–1016	1.99
213	9	"The Getaway"	Alan Smart (animation), Adam Paloian (supervising)	Written by : Kaz; Storyboarded by : Brian Morante	June 10, 2017	325–1017	1.66
213	9	"Lost and Found"	Tom Yasumi (animation), Sherm Cohen (supervising)	Written by : Dani Michaeli; Storyboarded by : Fred Osmond	June 10, 2017	325–1019	1.66
214	10	"Patrick's Coupon"	Tom Yasumi (animation), Dave Cunningham (supervising)	Written by : Kaz; Storyboarded by : Kelly Armstrong	June 17, 2017	325–1021	1.77
214	10	"Out of the Picture"	Alan Smart (animation), Sherm Cohen (supervising)	Written by : Ben Gruber; Storyboarded by : Fred Osmond	June 17, 2017	325–1020	1.77
215	11	"Feral Friends"	Alan Smart (animation), Dave Cunningham (supervising)	Written by : Mr. Lawrence; Storyboarded by : Brian Morante	October 7, 2017	325–1009	1.81
215	11	"Don't Wake Patrick"	Tom Yasumi (animation), Adam Paloian (supervising)	Written by : Brian Morante and Mr. Lawrence; Storyboarded by : Brian Morante	October 7, 2017	325–1022	1.81

== See also ==
- List of SpongeBob SquarePants episodes (seasons 11–present)
- SpongeBob SquarePants (film series)
