= Morning Songs =

EP by Jim Stärk
- Released: 2004
- Label: Sweet Recordings

Jim Stärk chronology
No Time Wasted (2003)	Morning Songs (2004)	Jim Stärk (2005)

Morning Songs is an EP by Jim Stärk which went to No. 1 on the Norwegian music charts in 2004. It was the biggest-selling EP in Norwegian chart history.

== Track listing ==
- "Morning Song" - 2:59
- "Don't You Have a Friend" - 4:50
- "Endless Summer" - 2:29
- "Like a Summer" - 3:42 (written by Townes Van Zandt and Einar Stokkes Fadnes)
- "Heart of Coal" - 4:07
