= SpongeBob SquarePants Presents The Tidal Zone =

Anthology series in the animated series SpongeBob SquarePants

- Also known as: The Tidal Zone: A SpongeBob Universe Special
- Genre: Comedy; Surreal humor
- Based on: SpongeBob SquarePants by Stephen Hillenburg
- Starring: Tom Kenny; Bill Fagerbakke; Rodger Bumpass; Clancy Brown; Carolyn Lawrence; Mr. Lawrence; Jill Talley; Lori Alan; Dana Snyder
- Country of origin: United States
- Original language: English
- No. of episodes: 5

Production
- Production companies: United Plankton Pictures, Inc. Nickelodeon Animation Studio

Original release
- Network: Nickelodeon
- Release: January 13, 2023

SpongeBob SquarePants Presents The Tidal Zone, referred to more simply as SpongeBob and the Tidal Zone, (also known as The Tidal Zone: A SpongeBob Universe Special), is an American animated anthology television special based on the Nickelodeon animated series SpongeBob SquarePants and its corresponding franchise, branded as the SpongeBob Universe. A parody and homage to horror anthology television programs, mainly The Twilight Zone, the special comprises five episodes, being the 12th episode of the thirteenth season of SpongeBob SquarePants, the first half of the fourteenth episode of the first season of The Patrick Star Show, and the second half of the twenty-first episode of the first season of Kamp Koral: SpongeBob's Under Years. The special was announced on July 22, 2022, at Nickelodeon's San Diego Comic-Con panel, and premiered on January 13, 2023.

== Premise ==
The Tidal Zone is a collection of stories set in the SpongeBob SquarePants universe, unified by themes of absurdity and surrealism. Each segment is introduced and concluded by the iconic French Narrator. Threaded through the special is a subplot involving GrandPat Star, who uses a time-traveling closet in an attempt to return home, making occasional appearances across the different segments.

== Cast ==
- Tom Kenny as SpongeBob, French Narrator, Ouchie, Slappy, Audience, Mummies, Virtual Pedestrians, SpongeBot, Mirror SpongeBot, RoboGary, Pedestrian Robots, Boy Camper #1, Campers, Kid, Old Klopnodian Man, Customers
- Bill Fagerbakke as Patrick Star, Pat-Tron, Clown, Virtual Pedestrians, Pedestrian Robots, Campers, Anchovies, Cowboy #1
- Rodger Bumpass as Squidward, Captain Doug Quasar, Daddy Dartfish, Audience, Mummies, Virtual Pedestrians, SquidBot, SquidBot Twin, Pedestrian Robots, Elwood, Campers, Mysterious Voice, Demon, Townsfolk #1, Customers
- Clancy Brown as Mr. Krabs, RoboKrabs, Pedestrian Robots, Customers
- Carolyn Lawrence as Sandy Cheeks, Girl, Sandroid, Pedestrian Robots, Girl Camper, Campers
- Mr. Lawrence as Plankton, Rubedor, Teensy Tom, PlankBot, RoboLarry, RoboRube, Pedestrian Robots, Skateboard Camper, Boy Camper #2, Campers, Anchovies, Cowboy #2
- Jill Talley as Karen, Squidina Star, Mommy Dartfish, Audience, Mummies, Virtual Pedestrians, Pedestrian Robots, Campers
- Lori Alan as Pearl
- Dana Snyder as GrandPat Star, Audience Member, Audience, Mummies, Virtual Pedestrians, Hot Dog Vendor, Pedestrian Robots, Campers, Customers
- Cree Summer as Bunny Star, Sister Dartfish, Virtual Pedestrians
- Thomas F. Wilson as Cecil Star, Audience, Mummies, Virtual Pedestrians
- Dee Bradley Baker as Tinkle, Bubble Bass, Kevin C. Cucumber, Anchovies
- Patrick Pinney as Painty the Pirate
- Dashiell McGaha-Schletter as Kids
- Zoe McGaha-Schletter as Kids

== Episodes ==
| No. | Title | Directed by | Written by | Original release date |
|---|---|---|---|---|
| 1 (Note: This is an episode of The Patrick Star Show.) | "Shrinking Stars" | Ian Vazquez | Mr. Lawrence | January 13, 2023 |
While conducting an interview, Pat-Tron strikes the Star family with his shrink ray. GrandPat mistakes them for insects and tries to get rid of them. He later ends up in Patrick's time closet that takes him to alternate realities.
| 2 (Note: This is an episode of SpongeBob SquarePants.) | "Welcome to Binary Bottom" | Dave Cunningham | Mr. Lawrence | January 13, 2023 |
A quick look at an alternate reality version of Bikini Bottom where everyone is a robot. Robo-Gary wants to play with SpongeBot who has to work, causing chaos after getting stuck to SquidBot. GrandPat sees the danger and leaves this reality. The chaos angers Sandroid, who merges with everyone else to create one giant mech robot. The Sandroid then heads to the live-action city as the French Narrator closes out the story revealing himself to be a robot too as he starts to glitch.
| 3 (Note: This is an episode of Kamp Koral: SpongeBob's Under Years.) | "The Switch Glitch" | Brandon Warren | Kaz | January 13, 2023 |
Karen and Patrick accidentally switch brains due to electric charges caused by lightning berries.
| 4 | "You're Going to Pay... Phone" | Sherm Cohen | Andrew Goodman | January 13, 2023 |
Mr. Krabs follows a rolling coin that inserts itself into a payphone up for sale at an antique shop. In an attempt to make more money, Mr. Krabs installs the phone in the Krusty Krab. However, a demon who manages the phone from inside of it continuously makes mind controlling calls to him that force him to give away free things, such as Krabby Patties and his own money. The demon swaps places with Krabs, who gets used to managing the phone. However, Squidward tosses the phone in the dumpster. The French Narrator closes out the story as he gets a call to do one more story.
| 5 | "A Skin Wrinkle in Time" | Sherm Cohen | Andrew Goodman | January 13, 2023 |
GrandPat travels through time to get back home, going to places such as a western and the SpongeBob theme song, eventually returning to a reality where the only thing different is that the Star family is flies. The French Narrator closes out the special and turns off the TV as GrandPat quotes "Hey! I was watching that!"

== Release ==
The special was announced at Nickelodeon's San Diego Comic Con panel on July 22, 2022. It was originally scheduled to air on November 25, 2022, but it was delayed for unknown reasons. Instead, that slot was taken by the television premiere of The SpongeBob Movie: Sponge on the Run. On December 13, 2022, the special was rescheduled to January 13, 2023. It was later included on the SpongeBob SquarePants: The Complete Thirteenth Season DVD as well as the Kamp Koral: SpongeBob's Under Years - Season 1, Volume 2 and The Patrick Star Show: Season 1, Volume 2 DVD sets.

=== Reception ===
David King of BubbleBlabber.com called the special decent, saying that "It's hard to believe a long-running franchise like this hasn't had anything like this that isn't a Halloween special. I give it points for creativity at least for 'out-weirding' itself, and given the popularity that SpongeBob has obtained for decades, I have the feeling we might get more of these in the future."
