= SpongeBob SquarePants season 13 =

Season of television series

SpongeBob SquarePants
- Season 13
- DVD cover
- Showrunners: Marc Ceccarelli; Vincent Waller
- Starring: Tom Kenny; Bill Fagerbakke; Rodger Bumpass; Clancy Brown; Carolyn Lawrence; Mr. Lawrence; Jill Talley; Mary Jo Catlett; Lori Alan
- No. of episodes: 26 (52 segments)

Release
- Original network: Nickelodeon
- Original release: October 22, 2020 – November 1, 2023

Season chronology
- ← Previous; Season 12 Next → Season 14

The thirteenth season of the American animated television series SpongeBob SquarePants, created by former marine biologist and animator Stephen Hillenburg, began airing on Nickelodeon in the United States on October 22, 2020, and ended on November 1, 2023. It consists of 26 episodes comprising 52 segments, alongside two standalone clip show specials, making it the longest season to date episode-wise. The series chronicles the exploits and adventures of the title character and his various friends in the fictional underwater city of Bikini Bottom. This is the first season without Hillenburg's involvement, following his death on November 26, 2018, though he is still credited as an executive producer. During this season, showrunners and co-executive producers Marc Ceccarelli and Vincent Waller were promoted to executive producer roles.

The SpongeBob SquarePants: The Complete Thirteenth Season DVD was released in region 1 on December 5, 2023.

== Production ==
On July 17, 2019, it was announced that the series had been renewed for a thirteenth season consisting of 13 episodes. The season began airing on October 22, 2020. On August 11, 2021, it was announced that Nickelodeon had ordered 13 additional episodes for the thirteenth season.

== Episodes ==
The episodes are ordered below according to Nickelodeon's packaging order, and not their original production or broadcast order.

No. overall	No. in season	Title	Directed by (Note: Information is taken from the opening credits of each episode.)	Written by	Original release date	U.S. viewers (millions)
268	1	"A Place for Pets"	Animation by : Alan Smart	Written by : Andrew Goodman; Storyboarded by : Benjamin Arcand (director)	October 22, 2020	0.85
268	1	"Lockdown for Love"	Animation by : Alan Smart	Written by : Mr. Lawrence; Storyboarded by : John Trabbic (director)	October 22, 2020	0.85
"A Place for Pets": Mr. Krabs allows pets in the Krusty Krab, although a health violation forces him to choose between restricting the restaurant to either people or pets. When he favors pets, much to SpongeBob's delight and Squidward's dismay, the other customers collectively refuse to eat at the Chum Bucket and begin disguising themselves as pets to get back in. After they have settled their differences and start to eat together, a fire marshal notifies Mr. Krabs that the Krusty Krab is past the allowed capacity, so he bans pets again. "Lockdown for Love": Karen insists on having a romantic date with Plankton, locking down the Chum Bucket until he can prove he loves her. However, Plankton is focused on getting the Krabby Patty secret formula, which Mr. Krabs has unknowingly dropped in front of the Krusty Krab. Plankton disguises Patrick as himself and attempts to escape without Karen knowing, although he is later caught.
269	2	"Under the Small Top"	Animation by : Alan Smart	Written by : Ben Gruber; Storyboarded by : Mike Dougherty (director)	April 16, 2021	0.59
269	2	"Squidward's Sick Daze"	Animation by : Alan Smart	Written by : Ben Gruber; Storyboarded by : Sarah Visel (director)	April 16, 2021	0.59
"Under the Small Top": SpongeBob orders a package with circus sea fleas, but a mishap occurs, with the package being delivered to Squidward instead. After he throws the sea fleas away and brutally stomps on them, they get out of the package and torment Squidward as revenge. "Squidward's Sick Daze": Squidward decides not to go to the Krusty Krab and enjoy the day for himself, pretending to be sick. However, Mr. Krabs, not believing him, hires SpongeBob to take care of Squidward.
270	3	"Goofy Scoopers"	Animation by : Michelle Bryan; Supervising direction by : Dave Cunningham	Written by : Andrew Goodman; Storyboarded by : Fred Osmond (director)	February 25, 2022	0.42
270	3	"Pat the Dog"	Animation by : Alan Smart	Written by : Kaz; Storyboarded by : Mike Dougherty (director)	July 9, 2021	0.56
"Goofy Scoopers": SpongeBob and Patrick try to reunite an animatronic robot band together after they were fired from Goofy Goober's. "Pat the Dog": SpongeBob finds Patrick at the Animal Shelter after he goes into "worm mode", and tries to train him before giving him up to Squidward, who only attempts to get rid of him.
271	4	"Something Narwhal This Way Comes"	Animation by : Alan Smart; Supervising direction by : Dave Cunningham	Written by : Mr. Lawrence; Storyboarded by : Piero Piluso (director)	November 19, 2021	0.49
271	4	"C.H.U.M.S"	Animation by : Andrew Overtoom; Supervising direction by : Sherm Cohen	Written by : Ben Gruber; Storyboarded by : Bill Reiss (director)	November 19, 2021	0.49
"Something Narwhal This Way Comes": Nobby and Narlene (SpongeBob's friends from Kamp Koral) make a return to Bikini Bottom. While everything goes smoothly at first, a lot of their past relatives join in and the entire town is flooded with them while making everything hillbilly like, so SpongeBob, Nobby and Narlene recruit Plankton and his relatives to stop them. "C.H.U.M.S": While Plankton is scheming another way to get the Krabby Patty Formula, SpongeBob unknowingly blasts him with water, which causes him to fall into the sewers. Subsequently, he meets monsters made of his Chum, which gives him the idea to use them to get the formula. It is now up to SpongeBob to (still unknowingly) save the day.
272	5	"SpongeBob's Road to Christmas"	Animation by : Michelle Bryan and Andrew Overtoom; Supervising direction by : Benjamin Arcand	Written by : Kaz; Storyboarded by : Benjamin Arcand (director)	December 10, 2021	0.44
After a failed attempt to give Santa Claus a present for him, SpongeBob recruits Patrick and Plankton to travel to the North Pole to deliver it. When they arrive, they learn that Santa Claus is Patchy the Pirate cosplaying as Santa Claus and the real Santa is not here, so they become Santa so they could deliver presents to kids, but when the elves figure out, they get into a war with the reindeer until Santa shows up. Meanwhile, Plankton attempts to find Santa's naughty and nice list and transfer his name to the nice list.
273	6	"Potato Puff"	Storyboarded by : Ian Vazquez	Written by : Danny Giovannini; Storyboarded by : David Thomas (director)	April 22, 2022	0.44
273	6	"There Will Be Grease"	Animation by : Andrew Overtoom; Supervising direction by : Dave Cunningham	Written by : Andrew Goodman; Storyboarded by : Fred Osmond (director)	April 29, 2022	0.40
"Potato Puff": Tired of SpongeBob crashing his boat in Boating School all the time, Mrs. Puff replaces herself with a potato so she can have time for herself, instead teaching SpongeBob remotely, all the while making him think the potato is her. "There Will Be Grease": SpongeBob finds grease made from Mr. Krabs' Krabby Patties and Plankton's chum in front of their restaurants, and they decide to work together to invent Everything Juice, a liquid that works for literally everything.
274	7	"The Big Bad Bubble Bass"	Animation by : Andrew Overtoom; Supervising direction by : Dave Cunningham	Written by : Andrew Goodman; Storyboarded by : Zeus Cervas (director)	May 6, 2022	0.39
274	7	"Sea-Man Sponge Haters Club"	Animation by : Michelle Bryan; Supervising direction by : Sherm Cohen	Written by : Luke Brookshier; Storyboarded by : Kenny Pittenger (director)	May 6, 2022	0.39
"The Big Bad Bubble Bass": In a parody of "The Three Little Pigs", Karen narrates the story of Bubble Bass (in the role of the Big Bad Wolf) trying to steal the last of an action figure that SpongeBob and Patrick bought from the toy store. "Sea-Man Sponge Haters Club": Squidward hosts a secret "We Hate SpongeBob" club at his house, where he, Mrs. Puff, Bubble Bass, Plankton, and the mailman each tell about a horrible, but highly exaggerated, encounter they had with SpongeBob.
275	8	"Food PBFFT! Truck"	Animation by : Michelle Bryan; Supervising direction by : Sherm Cohen	Written by : Luke Brookshier; Storyboarded by : Zeus Cervas (director)	May 13, 2022	0.38
275	8	"Upturn Girls"	Storyboarded by : Ian Vazquez	Written by : Danny Giovannini; Storyboarded by : Ryan Jouas & Keegan Tsetta (directors)	May 13, 2022	0.38
"Food PBFFT! Truck": SpongeBob and Squidward attempt to sell Krabby Patties on the road, but always find competitors on the way. After they are done visiting other places, they visit Rock Bottom, where they attempt to sell a patty to a very strange customer. "Upturn Girls": Pearl takes Narlene with her to show her the big city and have a whales' day out. On their way, they visit Lady Upturn's fancy mall, but cause chaos while shopping.
276	9	"Say Awww!"	Storyboarded by : Ian Vazquez	Written by : Andrew Goodman; Storyboarded by : Dan Becker (director)	May 20, 2022	0.32
276	9	"Patrick the Mailman"	Animation by : Andrew Overtoom; Supervising direction by : Dave Cunningham	Written by : Luke Brookshier; Storyboarded by : Nick Lauer & Kurt Snyder (directors)	May 20, 2022	0.32
"Say Awww!": To be seen as evil instead of cute, in his latest plan, Plankton builds a robot duck that swallows up anyone who says "awww" to it. "Patrick the Mailman": After crushing the mailman with a giant rock, Patrick decides to take on the mailman's job along with SpongeBob, and chaos ensues.
277	10	"Captain Pipsqueak"	Animation by : Michelle Bryan; Supervising direction by : Sherm Cohen	Written by : Richard Pursel; Storyboarded by : Zeus Cervas (director)	July 22, 2022	0.37
277	10	"Plane to Sea"	Animation by : Michelle Bryan; Supervising direction by : Sherm Cohen	Written by : Danny Giovannini; Storyboarded by : Dan Becker & Zeus Cervas (directors)	July 22, 2022	0.37
"Captain Pipsqueak": In another attempt to steal the secret Krabby Patty formula, Plankton, after watching a Mermaid Man and Barnacle Boy episode on TV, gets an idea to join the villain group known as E.V.I.L. "Plane to Sea": SpongeBob and Patrick take Squidward on a plane trip to the Bora Bora Bottom resort, but their childish antics ruin the flight experience for him.
278	11	"Squidferatu"	Animation by : Andrew Overtoom; Supervising direction by : Dave Cunningham; Storyboard supervision by : Ian Vazquez	Written by : Mr. Lawrence; Storyboarded by : Dan Becker & Fred Osmond (directors)	October 14, 2022	0.23
278	11	"Slappy Daze"	Animation by : Andrew Overtoom; Supervising direction by : Dave Cunningham	Written by : Mr. Lawrence; Storyboarded by : Kenny Pittenger (director)	October 14, 2022	0.23
"Squidferatu": Squidward and SpongeBob venture to Nosferatu's castle in order to return the mail that Squidward accidentally received. "Slappy Daze": Slappy takes a trip throughout Bikini Bottom while Nosferatu visits the doctor.
279	12	"Welcome to Binary Bottom"	Animation directed by : Andrew Overtoom; Supervising direction by : Dave Cunningham	Written by : Mr. Lawrence; Storyboarded by : Fred Osmond (director)	January 13, 2023	0.31
279	12	"You're Going to Pay... Phone"	Animation directed by : Michelle Bryan; Supervising direction by : Sherm Cohen	Written by : Andrew Goodman; Storyboarded by : Zeus Cervas (director)	January 13, 2023	0.31
279	12	"A Skin Wrinkle in Time"	Animation directed by : Michelle Bryan; Supervising direction by : Sherm Cohen	Written by : Andrew Goodman; Storyboarded by : Zeus Cervas (director)	January 13, 2023	0.31
"Welcome to Binary Bottom": In the first SpongeBob segment of "The Tidal Zone" special, the French Narrator introduces the audience to Binary Bottom. Robo-Gary causes insanity in town when he sneakily tags along with SpongeBot to work. GrandPat finds himself involved in the mayhem while in his search to get home. "You're Going to Pay... Phone": Mr. Krabs installs a demon-inhibiting, brain-manipulating payphone into The Krusty Krab, constantly hypnotizing the crustacean to go against his own greedy nature. "A Skin Wrinkle in Time": GrandPat's travels to get home across "The Tidal Zone" finally come to an end as he encounters cowboys, seahorses, and even the series' theme song icon, Painty the Pirate. 12a: Note : This episode continues a crossover event that begins on The Patrick Star Show season 1 episode 20, continues on Kamp Koral season 1 episode 21 and SpongeBob SquarePants season 13 episode 12b, and concludes on SpongeBob SquarePants season 13 episode 12c. 12b: Note : This episode continues a crossover event that begins on The Patrick Star Show season 1 episode 20 and SpongeBob SquarePants season 13 episode 12a, continues on Kamp Koral season 1 episode 21, and concludes on SpongeBob SquarePants season 13 episode 12c. 12c: Note : This episode concludes a crossover event that begins on The Patrick Star Show season 1 episode 20, and continues on SpongeBob SquarePants season 13 episode 12a, Kamp Koral season 1 episode 21, and SpongeBob SquarePants season 13 episode 12b.
280	13	"Abandon Twits"	Storyboarded by : Ian Vazquez	Written by : Luke Brookshier; Storyboarded by : Dan Becker (director)	January 20, 2023	0.32
280	13	"Wallhalla"	Animation directed by : Andrew Overtoom; Supervising direction by : Dave Cunningham	Written by : Danny Giovannini; Storyboarded by : Zeus Cervas (director)	January 20, 2023	0.32
"Abandon Twits": Mr. Krabs recruits SpongeBob and Squidward to build a ship for him over the weekend. Throughout various physical escapades, the duo satisfy their boss's needs, with results being mediocre at best. The crustacean remarks that the ship is only in need of a little paint, quickly fancying it up into a Krusty Krab-themed selling machine. Everything initially goes well, but once the ship is raked into Bubble Bass' bottom, things immediately go downhill as it slowly sinks in the ocean. As day slowly turns to night, the Krusty Krew is suddenly brought back from the deep by a kraken, saying he'll buy every patty they've got – with Squidward sighing in sadness. "Wallhalla": SpongeBob meets a crazed castaway named Wally in the pineapple's walls, and quickly befriends him in his humble abode titled 'Wallhalla'. It doesn't take the sponge long to realize that his presence is the only thing ruining Wally's life.
281	14	"Salty Sponge" "The Salty Sponge"	Storyboarded by : Ian Vazquez; Animation directed by : Andrew Overtoom	Written by : Doug Lawrence; Storyboarded by : Fred Osmond (director)	January 27, 2023	0.27
281	14	"Karen for Spot"	Animation directed by : Andrew Overtoom; Supervising direction by : Dave Cunningham	Written by : Danny Giovannini; Storyboarded by : Dan Becker (director)	February 3, 2023	0.24
"Salty Sponge": SpongeBob is sent to work at The Salty Spitoon, as the Krusty Krab has come upon an urchin infestation. Despite the tough and frightening attitude that its members possess, the sponge's positive and naive outlook flips the area upside-down. "Karen for Spot": While Plankton is away visiting the Doomsday Device Expo, Karen is left to take care of Spot, his beloved pet. Things end up being tougher than the robot imagined, so SpongeBob and Gary (in for Spot's daily playdate with the sea-snail) help her out.
282	15	"Arbor Day Disarray"	Animation directed by : Michelle Bryan; Supervising direction by : Sherm Cohen	Written by : Luke Brookshier; Storyboarded by : Zeus Cervas (director)	June 27, 2023	0.11
282	15	"Ain't That the Tooth"	Storyboarded by : Ian Vazquez; Animation directed by : Michelle Bryan	Written by : Danny Giovannini; Storyboarded by : Dan Becker (director)	June 28, 2023	0.13
"Arbor Day Disarray": Sandy creates special acorns using science to create "saltwater trees," which are trees that can grow underwater, with various Bikini Bottomites like Patrick, Squidward, Mr. Krabs and Mrs. Puff getting theirs. Eventually, the trees start talking and making rude, "salty" remarks and eventually run loose around Bikini Bottom. "Ain't That the Tooth": Patrick confuses returning burglar antagonist Dorsal Dan for the Tooth Fairy, and he and SpongeBob are tricked into following him around as his goons, attempting to steal money and riches from the innocent. However, the duo's naïveté ends up ruining Dan's plan, often causing more misery and abuse for him than intended.
283	16	"Ma and Pa's Big Hurrah"	Animation directed by : Andrew Overtoom; Supervising direction by : Dave Cunningham	Written by : Kaz; Storyboarded by : Fred Osmond (director)	March 10, 2023	0.21
283	16	"Yellow Pavement"	Animation directed by : Michelle Bryan; Supervising direction by : Sherm Cohen	Written by : Danny Giovannini; Storyboarded by : Eddie Trigueros (director)	March 17, 2023	0.21
"Ma and Pa's Big Hurrah": When their "Avocondo Acres" house rots to the point of being inhospitable, SpongeBob's parents, Harold and Margaret, come to stay at his pineapple while regrowing a new one. Despite SpongeBob acting "mature" and stuck-up in their presence, the two parents wreak havoc and are constantly thirsty for thrills. "Yellow Pavement": Mrs. Puff narrates a Red Asphalt-styled film in which SpongeBob and Squidward are used to demonstrate good and bad "boat smarts". Despite Squidward always following the rules of the road, SpongeBob's chaotic boatsman-ship and careless actions leave Squidward always getting the short end of the stick.
284	17	"The Flower Plot"	Storyboarded by : Ian Vazquez; Animation directed by : Alex Conaway and Jordy Judge	Written by : Doug Lawrence; Storyboarded by : Dan Becker (director)	March 24, 2023	0.30
284	17	"SpongeBob on Parade" "SpongeBob's on Parade"	Animation directed by : Andrew Overtoom; Supervising direction by : Dave Cunningham	Written by : Kaz; Storyboarded by : Zeus Cervas (director)	March 31, 2023	0.26
"The Flower Plot": Plankton and Karen fake their Bikini Bottom move-out and the former disguises as a florist named Petunia. Initially, Plankton uses it as another ploy to steal the Krabby Patty secret formula, but he eventually begins to like his newfound occupation. "SpongeBob on Parade": After hearing SpongeBob's advice on how a simple parade appearance could give the Krusty Krab free advertising, Mr. Krabs and his crew enter a float into Bikini Bottom's own parade. There, Perch Perkins and the Ice Cream King commentate on its various occurrences, most of which lead to utter chaos.
285	18	"Delivery to Monster Island"	Animation directed by : Michelle Bryan; Supervising direction by : Sherm Cohen	Written by : Andrew Goodman; Storyboarded by : Adam Paloian (director)	April 7, 2023	0.21
285	18	"Ride Patrick Ride"	Storyboarded by : Ian Vazquez	Written by : Luke Brookshier; Storyboarded by : Fred Osmond (director)	June 19, 2023	0.21
"Delivery to Monster Island": Plankton once again attempts to steal the Krabby Patty secret formula, but the bag that SpongeBob uses to deliver the delicacy inflates and flies him away to Monster Island. The two end up stranded, and have to work together in order to survive and escape the island's monstrous citizens. "Ride Patrick Ride": SpongeBob tries to teach Patrick how to ride a bike, but Patrick ends up in various crazy antics when he tries to ride one. SpongeBob sees this as a result of Patrick not being focused well, and proceeds to erase his memories so he can be more focused on riding the bike well.
286	19	"Hot Crossed Nuts"	Animation directed by : Andrew Overtoom; Supervising direction by : Dave Cunningham	Written by : Danny Giovannini; Storyboarded by : Benjamin Arcand (director)	June 20, 2023	0.19
286	19	"Sir Urchin and Snail Fail"	Animation directed by : Michelle Bryan; Supervising direction by : Sherm Cohen	Written by : Doug Lawrence; Storyboarded by : Dan Becker and Fred Osmond (directors)	June 21, 2023	0.15
"Hot Crossed Nuts": Sandy brings her homemade BBQ nut snack over to the Krusty Krab, where it becomes a big hit with customers who eat them and cause them to breathe fire. Eventually, demand for these nuts increases so much that they outsell Krabby Patties, causing Mr. Krabs to turn his restaurant into Kowboy Krab's Nut Shack, and causing SpongeBob to feel left out and leaving him to cook Krabby Patties outside. "Sir Urchin and Snail Fail": An episode of SpongeBob and Patrick's favorite comedy series Sir Urchin and Snail Fail goes awry when Snail Fail wants the viewers to see him as not just as a simple, dimwitted snail, instead rather a thespian. When the two split up and move on to different careers, SpongeBob and Patrick are set on bringing them back together. Guest star: Kevin Michael Richardson as Sir Urchin
287	20	"Friendiversary"	Storyboarded by : Ian Vazquez	Written by : Kaz; Storyboarded by : Zeus Cervas and Fred Osmond (directors)	June 22, 2023	0.13
287	20	"Mandatory Music"	Animation directed by : Andrew Overtoom; Supervisig direction by : Dave Cunningham	Written by : Luke Brookshier; Storyboarded by : Adam Paloian (director)	June 26, 2023	0.18
"Friendiversary": It's the day of SpongeBob and Squidward's "friendiversary," and SpongeBob continuously stalks Squidward around trying to celebrate and create more memories with him. The sponge's refusal to leave Squidward alone drives him to his edge, figuratively and literally erasing SpongeBob's knowledge of him. When Mr. Krabs reveals that SpongeBob's memories of Squidward keeps the Krabby Patty secret formula in check, the cephalopod's got to revive SpongeBob's recollection of him in a sequence of callbacks to various episodes from the past thirteen seasons of the series. "Mandatory Music": When Squidward's awful clarinet playing ends up causing destruction and damage around town, he's forced to take music classes at Little Flipper Music Academy, in which he's constantly frustrated by his supposed lack of talent and the superiority of SpongeBob's "flute-nose" music technique.
288	21	"Dopey Dick"	Animation directed by : Michelle Bryan; Supervising direction by : Sherm Cohen; Storyboard supervision by : Ian Vazquez	Written by : Doug Lawrence; Storyboarded by : Benjamin Arcand (director)	June 29, 2023	0.19
288	21	"Plankton and the Beanstalk"	Animation directed by : Michelle Bryan; Supervising direction by : Sherm Cohen	Written by : Doug Lawrence; Storyboarded by : Benjamin Arcand (director)	July 17, 2023	0.21
"Dopey Dick": In a special, 14-minute parody of Moby-Dick, Squidward acts as Fishmael, and he and the captain's crew of sailors join the hunt for a great white jellyfish named Dopey Dick. "Plankton and the Beanstalk": In a short, 7-minute parody of Jack and the Beanstalk, Plankton, acting as Jack, buys a magical bean with his penny, and Clockwork Karen feeds him the bean, making a beanstalk grow out of him that takes him to Ye Olde Krusty Krab. Inside that castle is Mr. Krabs as a giant, Squidward as a harp, and SpongeBob as a goose laying golden Krabby Patties.
289	22	"My Friend Patty"	Animation directed by : Andrew Overtoom; Supervising direction by : Dave Cunningham	Written by : Danny Giovannini; Storyboarded by : Dan Becker (director)	July 18, 2023	0.26
289	22	"FUN-Believable"	Animation directed by : Michelle Bryan; Supervising direction by : Sherm Cohen	Written by : Doug Lawrence; Storyboarded by : Adam Paloian (director)	July 19, 2023	0.18
"My Friend Patty": Sandy shows SpongeBob her new invention that can bring any item to life, which she uses on salt and pepper shakers and a Krabby Patty, the latter of which SpongeBob befriends and brings around town. SpongeBob tries to prevent others from eating his Krabby Patty friend, but the patty eventually reveals that he wishes for someone to eat him. Guest star: Rhys Darby as Krabby Patty "FUN-Believable": On Squidward's talk show, Rube Goldfish hosts his segment, "FUN-Believable", where he tours the viewers on various oddities and fun attractions in Bikini Bottom, including Sandy stuffing the most nuts in her cheeks, Nosferatu's castle, and the oldest citizen of Bikini Bottom.
290	23	"Spatula of the Heavens"	Storyboarded by : Ian Vazquez	Written by : Luke Brookshier; Storyboarded by : Benjamin Arcand (director)	July 20, 2023	0.19
290	23	"Gary's Playhouse"	Animation directed by : Andrew Overtoom; Supervising direction by : Dave Cunningham	Written by : Kaz; Storyboarded by : Zeus Cervas (director)	August 7, 2023	0.31
"Spatula of the Heavens": SpongeBob ends up breaking his spatula after leaving it on the grill and heating it up for too long, so he travels all the way to Mystical Misty Mountains to meet Guru Greasetrap and get his spatula re-forged. "Gary's Playhouse": SpongeBob builds a playhouse outside for Gary to play in. Gary replaces his shell with a yellow box to look like SpongeBob, then he's eventually joined by a slug playing Patrick, an urchin playing Squidward, and a sea bunny playing Mr. Krabs in tiny versions of their respective residences, including a re-enactment of a moment from the first episode of the series.
291	24	"Swimming Fools"	Storyboarded by : Ian Vazquez; Animation directed by : Michelle Bryan	Written by : Doug Lawrence; Storyboarded by : Adam Paloian (director)	August 8, 2023	0.24
291	24	"The Goobfather"	Animation directed by : Michelle Bryan; Supervising direction by : Sherm Cohen	Written by : Luke Brookshier; Storyboarded by : Zeus Cervas (director)	August 9, 2023	0.20
"Swimming Fools": SpongeBob builds a fancy-looking pool in his backyard, and Squidward's initially strongly resistant to taking a dip – but he gets the best of himself and ends up having the time of his life. When SpongeBob and Patrick come back to enjoy more pool fun the next day, Squidward's forced to hide as a pool toy, which doesn't work all too well as the duo choose him to play with, causing a ruckus. After enough abuse, Squidward undoes his toy form and apologizes, admitting he was jealous of SpongeBob's pool; SpongeBob joyfully accepts and allows Squid to jump off the high-diving board. Patrick's ignorance ends up lifting him up into space and zooming down, with his limbs detaching and his head being sucked into a pool filter. "The Goobfather": SpongeBob trips while serving Krabby Patties and ends up blending them into Bubble Bass's Kelp Shake, accidentally creating a new menu item, Patty Whips, that Mr. Krabs adds to the Krusty Krab menu and sells for $10. This gets attention from the Goofy Goober's manager, named "The Goobfather", who orders the Krusty Krab to stop selling them, resulting in competition between the two restaurants.
292	25	"SquidBird"	Animation directed by : Andrew Overtoom; Supervising direction by : Dave Cunningham	Written by : Danny Giovannini; Storyboarded by : Ryan Kramer (director)	August 10, 2023	0.25
292	25	"Allergy Attack!" "Allergy Attack"	Animation directed by : Michelle Bryan; Supervising direction by : Sherm Cohen	Written by : Luke Brookshier; Storyboarded by : Dan Becker (director)	October 30, 2023	0.13
"SquidBird": SpongeBob and Patrick use carrier clams to send messages to each other while they annoy Squidward in various comical methods, causing him to attempt to drive the clams away. When SpongeBob and Patrick see what is going on, they try to teach the clams to avoid Squidward. "Allergy Attack!": When SpongeBob's big kazillionth patty celebration crashes and burns due to a sudden rash, (an "allergy attack") he believes he's allergic to patties. Sandy tries to solve the situation by lending the sponge her old mechanical suit, but things get worse when everyone has to share the suit as the Krusty Krab customers begin to sprout itchy rash bumps all over their skin. By the end, it's revealed that Squidward's toilet-smelling cologne caused all of the pandemonium, with him getting his head blown up after spraying it upon himself.
293	26	"Big Top Flop"	Supervising direction by : Ian Vazquez	Written by : Kaz; Storyboarded by : Fred Osmond (director)	October 31, 2023	0.13
293	26	"Sandy, Help Us!"	Supervising direction by : Dave Cunningham; Animation directed by : Andrew Overtoom	Written by : Doug Lawrence; Storyboarded by : Zeus Cervas (director)	November 1, 2023	0.08
"Big Top Flop": An old enemy of Mr. Krabs', Ringmaster Mudkrab, steals all of the Krusty Krab's "Krustomers" when his circus comes to Bikini Bottom. To try and help migrate business back to his own eatery, he attempts to destroy the circus' legacy by taking over the show with the help of SpongeBob, Squidward, and Patrick. "Sandy, Help Us!": Sandy gets woken up by SpongeBob, panicking for help with his alarm clock at his home. Later, she ends up having to help more people in danger. After helping them and returning to her tree dome, Sandy discovers a monstrous clone of herself called "Pecan Sandy" which is angry with her and destroys Sandy's things. Luckily, Sandy was able to fight the clone with her old friend, Narlene. Sandy and Narlene then take their break as Pecan Sandy is destroying the rest of Bikini Bottom, leading to everyone running to Sandy's dome panicking for help.

== Specials ==
Title	Directed by (Note: Information is taken from the closing credits of each episode.)	Written by	Original release date	Prod. code	U.S. viewers (millions)
"The Patrick Star Fan Favorites Special"	Alex Foley	Alex Foley and Keston McMillan	November 12, 2021	881	0.37
Patrick Star "superfan" (and popular American YouTuber) Unspeakable counts down his favorite scenes featuring Bikini Bottom's own dimwitted sea star.
"Twas the Night Before Spongemas"	N/A	Benjamin Kurzrock	December 22, 2022	876	0.20
In a Christmas-themed compilation episode, the French narrator reads a story documenting the various thoughts and occurrences of all the characters leading up to "Spongemas" eve.

== DVD release ==
The DVD boxset for season thirteen was released by Paramount Home Entertainment and Nickelodeon in the United States and Canada on December 5, 2023.

SpongeBob SquarePants: The Complete Thirteenth Season
Set details			Special features
26 episodes (52 segment episodes); 4-disc set; 1.78:1 aspect ratio; Languages: English (Dolby Digital 5.1); Spanish (Dolby Stereo, only up to "Mandatory Music"); French (Dolby Stereo, only up to "Mandatory Music")			"The Tidal Zone: A SpongeBob Universe Special"
Release dates			"The Tidal Zone: A SpongeBob Universe Special"
Region 1	Region 2	Region 4	"The Tidal Zone: A SpongeBob Universe Special"
December 5, 2023	TBA	TBA	"The Tidal Zone: A SpongeBob Universe Special"
Episodes
Disc 1: "A Place for Pets", "Lockdown for Love", "Under the Small Top", "Squidward's Sick Daze", "Goofy Scoopers", "Pat the Dog", "Something Narwhal This Way Comes", "C.H.U.M.S", "SpongeBob's Road to Christmas", "Potato Puff", "There Will Be Grease", "The Big Bad Bubble Bass", and "Sea-Man Sponge Haters Club"; Disc 2: "Food PBFFT! Truck", "Upturn Girls", "Say Awww!", "Patrick the Mailman", "Captain Pipsqueak", "Plane to Sea", "Squidferatu", "Slappy Daze", "Welcome to Binary Bottom", "You're Going to Pay... Phone", "A Skin Wrinkle in Time", "Abandon Twits", "Wallhalla", "Salty Sponge", and "Karen for Spot"; Disc 3: "Arbor Day Disarray", "Ain't That the Tooth", "Ma and Pa's Big Hurrah", "Yellow Pavement", "The Flower Plot", "SpongeBob on Parade", "Delivery to Monster Island", "Ride Patrick Ride", "Hot Crossed Nuts", "Sir Urchin and Snail Fail", "Friendiversary", "Mandatory Music", "Dopey Dick", and "Plankton and the Beanstalk"; Disc 4: "My Friend Patty", "FUN-Believable", "Spatula of the Heavens", "Gary's Playhouse", "Swimming Fools", "The Goobfather", "SquidBird", "Allergy Attack!", "Big Top Flop", and "Sandy, Help Us!"
