= Plankton: The Movie =

2025 film by Dave Needham

- Promotional release poster
- Directed by: Dave Needham
- Screenplay by: Mr. Lawrence; Kaz; Chris Viscardi
- Story by: Mr. Lawrence
- Based on: SpongeBob SquarePants by Stephen Hillenburg
- Starring: Mr. Lawrence; Jill Talley; Tom Kenny; Bill Fagerbakke; Clancy Brown; Rodger Bumpass; Carolyn Lawrence; Lori Alan; Mary Jo Catlett
- Edited by: Lisa Linder Silver
- Music by: Mahuia Bridgman-Cooper
- Production company: Nickelodeon Movies
- Distributed by: Netflix
- Release date: March 7, 2025
- Running time: 84 minutes
- Country: United States
- Language: English
- Box office: $1.2 million

Plankton: The Movie is a 2025 American animated musical comedy film directed by Dave Needham and written by Kaz, Chris Viscardi, and Mr. Lawrence. Based on the television series SpongeBob SquarePants, created by Stephen Hillenburg, it stars the series' regular voice cast, and follows Plankton, whose plans for world domination are put to a halt when his computer wife, Karen, decides to take charge. It is the second in a series of SpongeBob character spin-off films for Netflix, following Saving Bikini Bottom: The Sandy Cheeks Movie in 2024.

The film was originally conceived by Lawrence as a half-hour special, but was eventually put into development as a feature. In March 2020, ViacomCBS announced that it would be producing SpongeBob spin-off films for streaming television. In June 2024, a spin-off film featuring the character Plankton as its lead was announced with its creative team attached. Mahuia Bridgman-Cooper composed the score, and Bret McKenzie, Linda Perry, Mark Mothersbaugh, and Bob Mothersbaugh wrote original songs.

Prior to its release, the entire film was leaked in August 2024, as a video upload online. Plankton: The Movie was officially released on Netflix on March 7, 2025. The film debuted with 14.3 million views during its premiere weekend, making it the number one overall title on the streamer's English-language film chart that week, and received generally positive reviews from critics.

== Plot ==
Plankton unsuccessfully attempts yet again to steal the Krabby Patty secret formula. When he returns home to the Chum Bucket, he is surprised that his computer wife Karen has turned the restaurant into a successful Mexican-themed chum restaurant with an active customer base. Frustrated that her decision does not fit his exact specifications of evil, he burns the place down. Fed up with Plankton never listening to her ideas, Karen removes her Empathy chip from her circuitry, transforms into a larger mech form, and magnetizes the Chum Bucket so that she can build a giant floating fortress, by magnetizing every other building and metal object across town, and take over the world without him.

Concerned, Plankton enlists the help of SpongeBob, who uses his hypnotism gear in order to get Plankton to be on the same page as Karen. Through flashbacks, it is revealed that Karen's original form was a calculator connected to a potato in a petri dish Plankton made during his childhood. Plankton later upgraded her to her current body at Bikini State University, where they built a freeze ray to put into motion plans to take over the world. Their original attempt at world domination was thwarted by a human child at the beach, who threw them back into the water, and it is revealed that overhearing Mr. Krabs jokingly say that the Krabby Patty secret formula is what will help him take over the world is what led Plankton to make his life's goal to steal the recipe.

The two head to the college and are able to find Karen's original body parts. Plankton uses Karen's original body parts to conceive a new mech in an attempt to destroy the original Karen, only for Karen to simply merge her into her mech body. Frustrated at Plankton's inability to take responsibility for his actions, SpongeBob brings him to the Gal Pals: Sandy, Pearl, and Mrs. Puff, where they install Karen's Empathy chip into his brain. This leads to him having a revelation, and the five infiltrate Karen's airship.

Karen disconnects her other selves to fight off the Gal Pals, while Plankton heads to reconcile with Karen. SpongeBob and Patrick head to the engine room, powered by potatoes, and cook all of the potatoes to mitigate the ship's fuel. Karen attempts to dismiss Plankton's attempt to win her back by handing him the Krabby Patty formula, but Plankton tells her that she was the real secret formula, and the two begin attempting to take over the world together once again. However, Patrick has eaten all of the potatoes that were stockading the engine room, causing the mech to crumble apart and restore Bikini Bottom to its former glory. Everyone attempts to attack Plankton and Karen, until SpongeBob intervenes, saying that he is a "sucker for a love story", to which everyone agrees and celebrates.

== Cast ==
=== Voice cast ===
- Mr. Lawrence as Sheldon Plankton (adult and teenager) and Rube
  - Dave Needham, the film's director, voices a handsome version of Plankton.
- Jill Talley as Karen Plankton, Super Snarky Karen, Super Smart Karen, Super Evil Karen, New Karen, All the Karens and others
- Tom Kenny as SpongeBob SquarePants, Gary the Snail, French Narrator and others
- Bill Fagerbakke as Patrick Star and others
- Rodger Bumpass as Squidward Tentacles and others
- Carolyn Lawrence as Sandy Cheeks
- Clancy Brown as Mr. Krabs and Pa Plankton
- Mary Jo Catlett as Mrs. Puff
- Lori Alan as Pearl Krabs
- Dee Bradley Baker as Perch Perkins and others
- Kate Higgins as Ma Plankton
- Various voices by Lisa Linder Silver

=== Live-action cast ===
- Mr. Lawrence as Snorkeler
- Genesis Clarre as Bucket Girl
- Sale Taylor as Ice Cream Guy
- Natalie Kailey as Sun Block Girl
- Austin Valli as Fitness Bro
- Abbi Ella Gonzales as Sand Castle Girl
- Toby Larsen as Sand Castle Boy
- Lisa Linder Silver as various

== Production ==
=== Conception and development ===
Mr. Lawrence, SpongeBob SquarePants veteran and the voice of Plankton, conceived the film four or five years before its release as a half-hour special titled, "Karen Takes Over". Around that same time, Nickelodeon was asking the SpongeBob crew to come up with ideas for character-driven spin-off films. Realizing that his idea was perfect for a feature film-format, Lawrence's story was put into development. Plankton: The Movie was developed concurrently with the fourth theatrical SpongeBob film, The SpongeBob Movie: Search for SquarePants. Lawrence was heavily involved in most aspects of the film's production. Vincent Waller, executive producer, described the film as "Doug's (Lawrence) movie" and as both a cast member and writer, "the perfect opportunity to explore both sides of what he has to offer for the show."

Plankton: The Movie showcases a deep dive into Plankton and Karen's relationship. Director Dave Needham was excited to work on the project because he felt it was darker and weirder than standard SpongeBob fare. Needham was working on The Loud House Movie (2021) when Nickelodeon approached him in the interest of hiring him on some of their other upcoming projects, and he immediately took a liking to Plankton: The Movie. He commented that it "sits just to the edge of what you'd expect from a SpongeBob movie." He added, "Of course, Karen becomes the real villain of this story, and it's hilarious to see Plankton go through all the stages of grief and revenge and acceptance to kind of become the hero."

In March 2020, it was reported that ViacomCBS would be producing two spin-off films based on SpongeBob for Netflix. In February 2022, during an investor call, Nickelodeon CEO Brian Robbins said that three SpongeBob character-driven spin-off films were in the works and that they would release exclusively on streamer Paramount+, with the first one premiering in 2023. However, in April 2023, it was reported that the first one, Saving Bikini Bottom: The Sandy Cheeks Movie, would instead debut on Netflix in 2024. In June 2024, it was announced that a second SpongeBob spin-off film for Netflix, titled Plankton: The Movie, was in production and would feature Plankton as its lead character. The series' regular voice cast of Mr. Lawrence, Jill Talley, Tom Kenny, Bill Fagerbakke, Carolyn Lawrence, Clancy Brown, and Rodger Bumpass were confirmed to reprise their roles. David Needham was announced as the film's director, with Mr. Lawrence co-writing the film, alongside Kaz and Chris Viscardi.

=== Animation ===
Plankton: The Movie's animation was provided by four vendors: ReDefine Animation, Mikros Animation, Yukfoo Animation, and McBess Studios. The film utilizes a mixture of CGI animation, four different styles of 2D animation, and live-action. The different animated sequences primarily take the form of flashbacks showcasing different points in Plankton's life, an idea proposed by Needham. The further a flashback sequence was in the timeline, the older the animation style used would be. For example, Plankton's childhood years would be animated using rubber hose style, while his teenage years would be brought to life with "something ‘50s or ‘70s." Executive producer Marc Ceccarelli stated, "It might be a cliché, but we think there's never a dull moment! If you don't like something, just give it seconds, and the style will change, and you'll see something completely different. We even have exciting battle scenes with giant robots."

== Music ==
Mahuia Bridgman-Cooper was announced as the composer, with Karyn Rachtman and Otis Ratchman as music supervisors. Additionally, the film features original songs written by Bret McKenzie, Linda Perry, Mark Mothersbaugh, and Bob Mothersbaugh. The songs and score were recorded at the Roundhead Studios in Auckland, with the Auckland Philharmonia performing the score. The soundtrack album was released by Lakeshore Records on March 7, 2025, the same day as the film.

== Release and reception ==
=== Viewership and box office performance ===
Similar to Saving Bikini Bottom: The Sandy Cheeks Movie, the entire film was leaked online as a video upload in August 2024 prior to its release. Plankton: The Movie was released on Netflix on March 7, 2025. It debuted with 14.3 million views over its premiere weekend, making it the number one overall title on Netflix's English-language film chart. The film finished its third week on the chart at number six, garnering an additional 5.5 million views. In China, the film was theatrically released on March 8, 2025, where it was distributed by China Film Group Corporation. The film grossed a total of $1.2 million, with $700,000 accumulated from its opening weekend.

According to data from Showlabs, Plankton: The Movie ranked sixth on Netflix in the United States during the week of 3–9 March 2025.

=== Critical response ===
On the review aggregator website Rotten Tomatoes, 71% of 14 critics' reviews are positive, with an average rating of 5.9/10. On Metacritic, the film has a score of 61 out of 100 based on 5 critics, indicating "generally favorable reviews".

Jesse Hassenger of The Guardian gave Plankton: The Movie a 3 out of 5 star rating and praised its experimental aspects, such as the 2D animated sequences, flashbacks, and musical numbers. He however opined that the CG animation was subpar to that of the regular SpongeBob series and that the film ultimately felt like several episodes stitched together rather than a genuine feature experience. Tara Brady of The Irish Times gave the film a 3.5 out of 5 star rating. Though they felt the CG animation to be lacking, they ultimately commended the film for its musical numbers and focus on existing series characters rather than celebrity guests. They concluded:"Who knew marital discord could be so much fun for all ages? Roll on, Squidward: The Movie." Ferdosa Abdi of Screen Rant gave the film a 9 out of 10 rating. Though they made minor criticisms to the runtime length and SpongeBob's large presence within the story, they ultimately lauded the feature for its match up of multiple genres, mixtures of several animation styles, voice-acting, writing, and musical numbers. Aidan Kelley of Collider gave the film an 8 out of 10 rating and referred to it as "one of the better things to come out of the SpongeBob Squarepants IP in recent years." They directed minor criticism to the main CG animation style, but lauded the voice performances (particularly Mr. Lawrence and Jill Talley), blend of differing animation styles, musical numbers, and writing. Bill Goodykoontz of The Arizona Republic gave the film a 2 out of 5 star rating. He commended the musical numbers, but felt the film to be disappointing as Plankton was his favorite character from the series. Criticisms were directed to the lengthy runtime, largely absent supporting cast from the series, and writing.

=== Accolades ===
Plankton: The Movie was nominated for Favorite Animated Movie at the 38th Nickelodeon Kids' Choice Awards.
