= The SpongeBob Movie: Search for SquarePants =

2025 film directed by Derek Drymon

- Theatrical release poster
- Directed by: Derek Drymon
- Screenplay by: Pam Brady; Matt Lieberman
- Story by: Marc Ceccarelli; Kaz; Pam Brady
- Based on: SpongeBob SquarePants by Stephen Hillenburg
- Produced by: Lisa Stewart; Pam Brady; Aaron Dem
- Starring: Tom Kenny; Clancy Brown; Rodger Bumpass; Bill Fagerbakke; Carolyn Lawrence; Mr. Lawrence; George Lopez; Isis "Ice Spice" Gaston; Arturo Castro; Sherry Cola; Regina Hall; Mark Hamill
- Cinematography: Peter Lyons Collister
- Edited by: Wyatt Jones
- Music by: John Debney
- Production companies: Paramount Animation; Nickelodeon Movies
- Distributed by: Paramount Pictures
- Release dates: October 26, 2025 (AFI Film Festival); December 19, 2025 (United States)
- Running time: 89 minutes (Note: The theatrical release runtime is 96 minutes, due to being accompanied by a short film, Teenage Mutant Ninja Turtles: Chrome Alone 2 – Lost in New Jersey.)
- Country: United States
- Language: English
- Budget: $64 million
- Box office: $169 million

The SpongeBob Movie: Search for SquarePants is a 2025 American animated adventure comedy film directed by Derek Drymon and based on the SpongeBob SquarePants television series created by Stephen Hillenburg. it stars the show's regular voice cast alongside George Lopez, Isis "Ice Spice" Gaston, Arturo Castro, Sherry Cola, Regina Hall, and Mark Hamill. The plot follows SpongeBob on a quest to prove his bravery by adventuring with the ghost pirate, the Flying Dutchman, through the Underworld. It is the fourth theatrical film based on the series, following 2020's Sponge on the Run.

The film was written by Pam Brady and Matt Lieberman, from a story by Brady and series creatives Marc Ceccarelli and Kaz. It was first developed as a direct-to-streaming film focused on Mr. Krabs, but the project was later retooled into a theatrical feature with SpongeBob as the lead character instead. By April 2023, Drymon had been hired to direct the film. In July 2024, Hamill was revealed to be voicing the Flying Dutchman in the film in place of Brian Doyle-Murray. John Debney composed the film's score, after having previously scored 2015's Sponge Out of Water.

Search for SquarePants premiered at the AFI Film Festival on October 26, 2025, before holding a premiere in New York City on December 17, and was theatrically released by Paramount Pictures in the United States on December 19. The film received positive reviews from critics and was a commercial success, grossing $169 million worldwide on a budget of $64 million.

== Plot ==
SpongeBob SquarePants finds that he has grown tall enough to ride an intense roller coaster, but is too afraid to do so. He aspires to be as brave as Mr. Krabs, who tells him that he was a swashbuckler in his youth. Upon discovering Mr. Krabs' secret basement containing his pirate relics, he unintentionally summons The Flying Dutchman, a ghost pirate who was cursed to eternally roam the Underworld until he can swap places with an innocent soul. Deeming SpongeBob the soul he needs to return to mortality, he invites him and his best friend Patrick Star into his crew and promises to help SpongeBob become a swashbuckler. Mr. Krabs, regretting having told SpongeBob that he is not brave, follows suit with Squidward Tentacles and Gary the Snail to rescue the duo.

The Dutchman informs SpongeBob that he must complete a series of dangerous trials and blow the Dutchman's horn in order to become a swashbuckler. SpongeBob overcomes the challenges with ease by doing what he believes Mr. Krabs would do. The Dutchman grows annoyed by Patrick's childish distractions, and convinces a reluctant SpongeBob to abandon him. When Mr. Krabs catches up with SpongeBob, the Dutchman forces him to admit that he was not a swashbuckler, but rather a fry cook who enjoyed blowing bubbles for which he was humiliated. Convinced by the Dutchman that Mr. Krabs lied to and does not believe in him, SpongeBob blows the Dutchman's horn, which swaps the curse from the Dutchman to SpongeBob and Mr. Krabs, who become bearded ghosts. The Dutchman becomes a human, regains his mortality, and spends his time in Santa Monica, California. The Dutchman betrays and leaves behind his assistant Barb, who then has a change of heart to tell SpongeBob and Mr. Krabs that they need to destroy the horn before sunset to reverse the curse.

After reconciling with Patrick, SpongeBob goes up with Mr. Krabs to the surface. They attempt to steal the horn, only for Dutchman to catch them and flee onto a roller coaster, believing SpongeBob is too cowardly to follow. Mr. Krabs encourages SpongeBob to embrace himself and use his bubble-blowing skills to his advantage. SpongeBob gains the courage to climb the ascending roller coaster vehicle and trap the horn within a bubble, which he pops to drop the horn to the ground and destroy it. The curse is reversed, and the Dutchman is demoted to kitchen duty for his actions while Barb takes his place as captain. Mr. Krabs celebrates SpongeBob for his bravery before they realize they left Squidward behind in the Underworld.

== Voice cast ==
- Tom Kenny as:
  - SpongeBob SquarePants
  - Gary the Snail
- Clancy Brown as Mr. Krabs
  - Brown also appears in live action as a pirate narrator in the film's prologue.
- Rodger Bumpass as Squidward Tentacles
- Bill Fagerbakke as Patrick Star
- Carolyn Lawrence as Sandy Cheeks
- Mr. Lawrence as Plankton
- Regina Hall as Barb, the Flying Dutchman's assistant
- Mark Hamill as The Flying Dutchman
- George Lopez as JK Fishlips, a fish executive at Paramount
- Isis "Ice Spice" Gaston as a ticket taker fish
- Arturo Castro as a Santa Monica ride operator
- Sherry Cola as:
  - A studio spokesperson
  - A Krusty Krab patron

== Production ==
=== Development ===
The film initially began development as a direct-to-streaming film focused on Mr. Krabs, coinciding with the franchise's character-focused Netflix films Saving Bikini Bottom: The Sandy Cheeks Movie (2024) and Plankton: The Movie (2025). The project was reworked into a theatrical feature, with SpongeBob as the lead character, after Paramount executives saw the first draft of the streaming version. In February 2022, the fourth theatrical SpongeBob SquarePants film was officially confirmed to be in development. In April 2023, during Paramount Pictures' CinemaCon panel, it was announced that the film would be titled The SpongeBob Movie: Search for SquarePants, with series veteran Derek Drymon set to direct the film. The screenplay was written by Pam Brady and Matt Lieberman, with a story by Marc Ceccarelli, Kaz, and Brady. Brady, Lisa Stewart, and Aaron Dem serve as producers. Paramount Animation and Nickelodeon Movies produce, in association with Domain Entertainment and MRC.

In April 2024, it was reported that the show's regular voice cast of Tom Kenny, Clancy Brown, Rodger Bumpass, Bill Fagerbakke, Carolyn Lawrence, and Mr. Lawrence would reprise their roles. At San Diego Comic-Con in July 2024, it was announced that Mark Hamill was voicing the Flying Dutchman, in place of his long-time voice actor Brian Doyle-Murray from the series. In June 2025 at the Annecy International Animation Film Festival, it was announced that Regina Hall, Sherry Cola, Arturo Castro, George Lopez, and Ice Spice were cast in the film.

=== Animation ===
Reel FX Animation was the main animation provider for the film. Liz Hemme served as the visual effects supervisor for the film. Visually, Drymon wanted to avoid hyper-realism or stylized CGI meant to mimic 2D animation. Inspired by 1960s plasticware and toys, he directed Reel FX to create a style that he felt looked more handmade and true to SpongeBob. This philosophy extended to every aspect of the film's visuals and encouraged the team to dial back realistic textures that they felt could be distracting and too incongruent with SpongeBob's cartoony world.

Drawing from the series' past, mixed media became intrinsic to the visual language. Drymon embraced imperfections and said: "visual inconsistency isn't a flaw to be corrected; it's a tool for comedy, particularly in a world that thrives on surprise and absurdity". The visual palette of the film was drawn from SpongeBob and various live-action inspirations such as Sam Raimi and Coen brothers films, Pirates of the Caribbean, and Three O'Clock High (1987). Head of story Mark O'Hare said, "We're making fun of these movies but also honoring them," and added: "The contrast between SpongeBob's world and those dynamic 3D cinematic styles is a big part of the fun". To emulate the feeling of Bikini Bottom stretching endlessly like it often does in the series, the team "had to dress environments to camera almost all the time" as opposed to building a set than shooting in it like in most other CG productions.

=== Music ===
John Debney was confirmed to compose the score for the film in April 2025, after having previously composed the score for The SpongeBob Movie: Sponge Out of Water (2015). Ice Spice performed an original song for the film, "Big Guy", which was released in November 2025; it is not included on the film's soundtrack. The soundtrack was released on December 19, 2025, on MOD-providers by Milan Records and Paramount Music.

== Release ==
The SpongeBob Movie: Search for SquarePants had its world premiere on October 26, 2025, as one of the closing films of the AFI Film Festival. It later held a premiere in New York City on December 17, and was theatrically released by Paramount Pictures in the United States on December 19, 2025. The film is accompanied by an animated short film, Teenage Mutant Ninja Turtles: Chrome Alone 2 – Lost in New Jersey. The film's release was previously scheduled for May 23, 2025, but was pushed back to December 19, 2025, with Mission: Impossible – The Final Reckoning taking the May 2025 slot due to the 2023 SAG-AFTRA strike.

=== Home media ===
The SpongeBob Movie: Search for SquarePants was released on digital on January 20, 2026, and on Blu-ray and DVD on March 31, 2026. The film began streaming on Paramount+ on February 17, 2026.

== Reception ==
=== Box office ===
The SpongeBob Movie: Search for SquarePants grossed $71 million in the United States and Canada, and $98 million in other territories, for a worldwide total of $169 million. It was produced on a budget of $64 million.

In the United States and Canada, The SpongeBob Movie: Search for SquarePants was released alongside Avatar: Fire and Ash, The Housemaid, and David, and was projected to gross $15–20 million from 3,557 theaters. The film made $6 million on its first day, including $1.4 million from Thursday night previews. It went on to debut to $16 million, finishing in fourth behind Fire and Ash, David, and The Housemaid. Its second weekend brought in $11.1 million, averaging $3,110 per theater in 3,570 theaters; it suffered a decline of -28.9%, ranking seventh behind David. Its third weekend declined by -25.2%, grossing $8.3 million, ranking sixth behind newcomer Anaconda.

=== Critical response ===
On the review aggregator website Rotten Tomatoes, 78% of 73 critics' reviews are positive, with an average rating of 6.4/10. The website's consensus reads: "A self-contained adventure with spiffy animation and a sweet message embedded in its goofy goober-ness, The Search for SquarePants is one of SpongeBob's most delightful big-screen outings yet." Metacritic, which uses a weighted average, assigned the film a score of 65 out of 100, based on 17 critics, indicating "generally favorable" reviews. Audiences polled by CinemaScore gave the film an average grade of "A–" on an A+ to F scale, the highest of the franchise, while those surveyed by PostTrak gave it a 70% overall positive score, with 44% saying they would definitely recommend the film.

Justin Lowe of The Hollywood Reporter gave the film a positive review, saying that the film "easily delivers another rib-tickling, delightfully frantic fourth installment of the series." Chris Wasser of the Sunday Independent gave the film three stars out of five, writing, "This vibrant cartoon adventure is as wacky as you'd expect." In a four star out of five review on The Irish Times, Tara Brady wrote that the visual gags were "fresh", the jokes were "funny", the world-building was "disarmily buoyant", and the musical cues were "playful". Derek Smith of Slant Magazine gave the film two-and-a-half stars out of four, writing that the film was "dotted with the whacky humor and ingenious puns that the fans of the series have come to expect."

Matt Zoller Seitz of RogerEbert.com gave the film four stars out of a possible four, writing that there "is no such thing as too many butt jokes," adding that "the movie averages one butt joke every five minutes." Tim Grierson of Screen Daily gave the film a positive review, writing that some of the jokes "can get a bit tedious," though said the film's adolescent tone was "never cruel or obnoxious." IndieWire's Alison Foreman gave the film a grade of "B", writing that while the comedy is not as dark as the series' golden age, it "casts a wide tonal net and catches a balanced effort" that she says is "both familiar and fresh with an appealing that could work for any one of SpongeBob's ages." In a positive review for The Film Verdict, Alonso Duralde said that SpongeBob "learns there's more than derring-do involved in becoming a 'big guy,'" and said that the message "never overwhelms the wacky comedy".

The film also received some negative reviews. Brandon Yu of The New York Times wrote that the movie "is bad on its own terms, mainly for its cynical philosophy of children's entertainment." Alistair Harkness of The Scotsman gave the film a rating of two stars out of five, writing that there's "no joy or craft in the jokes on offer; it's just a barrage of zaniness," though he stated that "there's nothing wrong with providing pure cinematic silliness for five, six and seven-year-olds." Fred Topel of United Press International gave the film a negative review, writing that the film was a "step down for SpongeBob." Joshua Mbonu of InSession Film gave the film a grade of "C", calling the film an "aggressively average venture", and writing that the "cartoon sponge's latest film outing couldn't be more forgettable on the whole."

Some reviewers criticized the film's choice to focus on a small number of characters, rather than utilize the rest of the franchise's cast. Justin Lowe of The Hollywood Reporter suggested that "longtime fans may be understandably disappointed" by the decision to "elbow aside" series regulars Pearl, Sandy, Plankton and Karen. Writing for The Daily Beast, Barry Levitt noted, "series stalwarts like Mrs. Puff appear only in a single shot (though she gets a half-hearted shout-out in 'Big Guy'). Sandy Cheeks and Plankton, fresh off their own movies, are reduced to cameos, and teen whale Pearl is nowhere to be found."

=== Accolades ===
Award	Date of ceremony	Category	Recipient(s)	Result	Ref.
Annie Awards	February 21, 2026	Best Character Design – Feature	Adam Paloian, Thaddeus Couldron, Alvi Ramirez	Nominated	
Art Directors Guild Awards	February 28, 2026	Best Animated Feature Film	The SpongeBob Movie: Search for SquarePants – Sean Haworth and Pablo R. Mayer	Nominated	
Cinema Audio Society Awards	March 7, 2026	Outstanding Achievement in Sound Mixing for Motion Pictures - Animated	Will Files, Mark Paterson, Steve Neal (re-recording mixers), Shawn Murphy (scoring mixer), and Jordan McClain (foley mixer)	Nominated	
Kids' Choice Awards	November 14, 2026	Favorite Animated Movie	The SpongeBob Movie: Search for SquarePants	Nominated	
Kids' Choice Awards	November 14, 2026	Favorite Male Animated Voice from a Movie	Tom Kenny	Nominated	
Kids' Choice Awards	November 14, 2026	Favorite Villain	Mark Hamill	Nominated	
Kids' Choice Awards	November 14, 2026	Favorite Song from a Movie	"Big Guy" – Ice Spice	Nominated	
Saturn Awards	March 8, 2026	Best Animated Film	The SpongeBob Movie: Search for SquarePants	Nominated	
