= Kamp Koral: SpongeBob's Under Years =

American animated television series

- Also known as: Kamp Koral
- Genre: Comedy
- Based on: SpongeBob SquarePants by Stephen Hillenburg
- Developed by: Luke Brookshier; Marc Ceccarelli; Andrew Goodman; Kaz; Mr. Lawrence; Vincent Waller
- Voices of: Tom Kenny; Bill Fagerbakke; Rodger Bumpass; Clancy Brown; Carolyn Lawrence; Mr. Lawrence; Mary Jo Catlett; Jill Talley; Lori Alan; Carlos Alazraqui; Kate Higgins; Dee Bradley Baker
- Theme music composer: Luke Brookshier; Marc Ceccarelli; Andrew Goodman; Kaz; Mr. Lawrence; Eban Schletter; Vincent Waller
- Composers: Nicolas Carr; Sage Guyton; Jeremy Wakefield; Brad Carow
- Country of origin: United States
- Original language: English
- No. of seasons: 2
- No. of episodes: 39 (75 segments)

Production
- Executive producers: Stephen Hillenburg; Marc Ceccarelli (2022–24); Vincent Waller (2022–24)
- Running time: 22 minutes
- Production companies: United Plankton Pictures, Inc. Nickelodeon Animation Studio

Original release
- Network: Paramount+ (Note: "The Switch Glitch" was first broadcast on Nickelodeon.)
- Release: March 4, 2021 – July 10, 2024

Related
- SpongeBob SquarePants; The Patrick Star Show

Kamp Koral: SpongeBob's Under Years, also known simply as Kamp Koral, is an American animated television series that premiered on Paramount+ on March 4, 2021. The series is a prequel and spin-off of the Nickelodeon series SpongeBob SquarePants, which was created by Stephen Hillenburg. It features younger versions of the series' characters and follows them as they attend a summer camp. The series was developed by Luke Brookshier, Marc Ceccarelli, Andrew Goodman, Kaz, Mr. Lawrence, and Vincent Waller.

In October 2018, during his first days as president of Nickelodeon, Brian Robbins put a room together to brainstorm ideas for potential SpongeBob spin-off series. In February 2019, it was reported that a SpongeBob spin-off series was in the works. In June 2019, the series was officially announced with a 13-episode first season, which was later expanded to 26 episodes in March 2021. The idea for Kamp Koral originated from the flashback scenes from the film The SpongeBob Movie: Sponge on the Run (2020).

In August 2021, the series was renewed for a second 13-episode season, which premiered on Paramount+ on July 10, 2024.

== Premise ==
The series follows a 10-year-old SpongeBob SquarePants as he spends his summer at a sleepaway camp called Kamp Koral. The camp is run by Mr. Krabs, a single father raising his baby daughter, Pearl. The camp's activities are overseen by Mrs. Puff, who works as the scoutmaster and arts-and-crafts teacher. SpongeBob bunks in a cabin with his friends Patrick Star and Sandy Cheeks. Their cabin is run by Squidward Tentacles, a pessimistic camper who is slightly older than the others (almost a teenager) and is a junior counselor.

Unbeknownst to the campers, the Krusty Kanteen's chef Plankton runs a secret laboratory underneath the camp where his computer assistant Karen helps him create elaborate inventions to take over the world. Episodes focus on SpongeBob and his friends learning more about the campsite, exploring new places, and taking part in summertime activities.

== Characters ==
- SpongeBob SquarePants (voiced by Tom Kenny) - A camper at Kamp Koral.
- Patrick Star (voiced by Bill Fagerbakke) - A camper at Kamp Koral and SpongeBob's best friend.
- Squidward Tentacles (voiced by Rodger Bumpass) - A junior camp counselor.
- Mr. Krabs (voiced by Clancy Brown) - The proprietor of Kamp Koral.
- Sandy Cheeks (voiced by Carolyn Lawrence) - A camper at Kamp Koral. In this show, she is shown to have braces.
- Sheldon Plankton (voiced by Mr. Lawrence) - A chef at the camp's Krusty Kanteen who secretly plots to take over the world.
- Mrs. Puff (voiced by Mary Jo Catlett) - The scoutmaster and activities director at Kamp Koral.
- Karen Plankton (voiced by Jill Talley) - Plankton's computer assistant.
- Pearl Krabs (voiced by Lori Alan) - Mr. Krabs' baby daughter.
- Nobby and Narlene (voiced by Carlos Alazraqui and Kate Higgins respectively) - Two hillbilly narwhals that live near Kamp Koral.
- Kidferatu - A camp counselor and the child version of Nosferatu.

== Release ==
The series was originally planned to premiere on Nickelodeon in July 2020, but on July 30, 2020, it was announced that the series would instead be released on CBS All Access, the ViacomCBS streaming service, in early 2021. It was later announced that the series will be airing on Nickelodeon as well later in the year. On January 28, 2021, it was announced that the first six episodes would release along with The SpongeBob Movie: Sponge on the Run on March 4, 2021, with the launch of Paramount+. The series also began airing on Nickelodeon on April 2, 2021. On June 24, 2021, it was announced that new episodes would release on Paramount+ on July 22, 2021.

On July 21, 2022, a "SpongeBob Universe" crossover special was announced, featuring the main series and spinoffs Kamp Koral and The Patrick Star Show. "The Tidal Zone", a spoof of The Twilight Zone, was originally set to premiere on Nickelodeon on November 25, 2022, before being delayed and rescheduled for release on January 13, 2023. Alongside this, it was announced that new episodes of Kamp Koral would release on Paramount+ on September 30, 2022. The final seven episodes of season one of Kamp Koral were released on May 26, 2023. The second season premiered on July 10, 2024.

== Production ==
=== Background and development ===
SpongeBob SquarePants creator Stephen Hillenburg died on November 26, 2018. Animator and producer Paul Tibbitt—who worked on SpongeBob between 1999 and 2018 and served as showrunner between 2005 and 2015—remarked, "In the animation business, you know, there always used to be the sort of joke... When you run out of ideas, you just do Muppet Babies. Steve [Hillenburg] would always say to me, 'You know, one of these days, they're going to want to make SpongeBob Babies. That's when I'm out of here.'"

The characters in their CGI designs

According to Vincent Waller, the idea for Kamp Koral originated in flashback scenes from The SpongeBob Movie: Sponge on the Run (2020). Having worked on the original show for years, Waller calculated the hierarchy of the camp and the ages of the characters (albeit, younger). Marc Ceccarelli helped develop the new characters and new locations. In October 2018, on one of Brian Robbins' first days as the president of Nickelodeon, he "decided to put a room together and really look at what the SpongeBob universe looks like". According to Robbins, "out of that came the Kamp Koral idea and actually a couple of other ideas".

=== Announcement ===
On February 14, 2019, it was announced that an unnamed spinoff of SpongeBob SquarePants was in the works at Nickelodeon. On June 4, 2019, it was announced that a CG-animated spinoff of SpongeBob SquarePants under the working title of Kamp Koral was officially green-lit with an initial order of 13 episodes. In response to news of the series, Paul Tibbitt criticized its announcement on Twitter the next day, stating, "I do not mean any disrespect to my colleagues who are working on this show. They are good people and talented artists. But this is some greedy, lazy executive-ing right here, and they ALL know full well Steve [Hillenburg] would have HATED this. Shame on them."

On February 19, 2020, the show was officially titled as Kamp Koral: SpongeBob's Under Years. It was also announced that the voice cast from SpongeBob SquarePants would return for the spinoff series. A sneak peek of the series aired during the Bears-Saints NFL wildcard game on January 10, 2021, on Nickelodeon.

On March 4, 2021, it was announced that an additional 13 episodes had been ordered, bringing the series total to 26 episodes. In August 2021, the series was renewed for a 13-episode second season.

== Episodes ==
=== Series overview ===
Series overview
Season	Episodes		Originally released
1	26	6	March 4, 2021
1	26	7	July 22, 2021
1	26	6	September 30, 2022
1	26	7	May 26, 2023
2	13		July 10, 2024

=== Season 1 (2021–23) ===
No. overall	No. in season	Title	Directed by	Written by	Original release date	Nickelodeon air date	Prod. code	U.S. linear viewers (millions)
1	1	"The Jellyfish Kid"	Supervising by : Sherm Cohen & Dave Cunningham; Storyboarded by : Brian Morante	Kaz	March 4, 2021	September 10, 2021	101	0.46
On the first day of jellyfish season, SpongeBob fails to catch a jellyfish. To help him, Sandy and Patrick disguise Squidward as a "jellyfish" to lure in SpongeBob, but suddenly a monster attacks. The monster eats Squidward and rampages across Kamp Koral. SpongeBob escapes the monster and saves the day, gaining the "Saving a Counselor from a Monster" badge.
2	2	"Sugar Squeeze"	Supervising by : Dave Cunningham; Storyboarded by : Brian Morante	Mr. Lawrence	March 4, 2021	April 2, 2021	102	0.71
2	2	"Tag, You're It"	Supervising by : Dave Cunningham; Storyboarded by : Mike Dougherty & John Sanford	Kaz	March 4, 2021	April 2, 2021	102	0.71
"Sugar Squeeze": SpongeBob and the other campers discover their candy has been stolen by two con-artist backwood narwhals named Narlene and Nobby for their "Sugar Squeeze". SpongeBob and the campers glow yellow after tasting it, which Mr. Krabs notices, and is tricked by Narlene into using a machine to get the campers back to normal. "Tag, You're It": SpongeBob, Patrick, and Sandy prepare to play tag, but they have to play inside after it starts to rain. They cause trouble, leading Squidward to throw them outside. Mr. Krabs eventually takes them in to play with baby Pearl, but Pearl's way of playing leads Mr. Krabs to demand Squidward to play with them. Later, the rain stops and Mr. Krabs is tagged forever.
3	3	"Quest for Tire"	Supervising by : Sherm Cohen; Storyboarded by : Kenny Pittenger	Mr. Lawrence	March 4, 2021	September 17, 2021	103	0.37
3	3	"Cabin of Curiosities"	Supervising by : Sherm Cohen; Storyboarded by : John Trabbic	Kaz	March 4, 2021	September 17, 2021	103	0.37
"Quest for Tire": The campers are forced to go primal when Kamp Koral's weekly food truck goes missing. "Cabin of Curiosities": During the nighttime, SpongeBob and Patrick meet the nocturnal, monstrous members of the Trawler cabin.
4	4	"In Search of Camp Noodist"	Supervising by : Sherm Cohen; Storyboarded by : Fred Osmond	Andrew Goodman	March 4, 2021	September 24, 2021	104	0.29
4	4	"Kitchen Sponge"	Supervising by : Dave Cunningham; Storyboarded by : Brian Morante	Andrew Goodman	March 4, 2021	September 24, 2021	104	0.29
"In Search of Camp Noodist": Narlene tells SpongeBob, Patrick and Sandy of a fabled nudist colony, setting them off on an adventure. "Kitchen Sponge": SpongeBob gives birth to the Krabby Patty when being tasked to help out Plankton with making food at the Krusty Kanteen.
5	5	"The Treasure of Kamp Koral"	Supervising by : Dave Cunningham; Storyboarded by : Mike Dougherty and Simon Edwards	Andrew Goodman	March 4, 2021	October 1, 2021	105	0.26
5	5	"Camper Gary"	Supervising by : Sherm Cohen; Storyboarded by : Brian Morante	Andrew Goodman	March 4, 2021	October 8, 2021	105	0.38
"The Treasure of Kamp Koral": Mr. Krabs tries to get his claws on treasure that SpongeBob and Patrick find buried under the campgrounds. "Camper Gary": Following up from the origins of SpongeBob and Gary's friendship from The SpongeBob Movie: Sponge on the Run, SpongeBob disguises Gary as a camper to protect him from a snail-loathing Mrs. Puff.
6	6	"Midnight Snack Attack"	Supervising by : Sherm Cohen; Storyboarded by : Fred Osmond	Luke Brookshier	March 4, 2021	November 19, 2021	106	0.40
6	6	"Hot Pearl-tato"	Supervising by : Dave Cunningham; Storyboarded by : Fred Osmond	Luke Brookshier	March 4, 2021	November 19, 2021	106	0.40
"Midnight Snack Attack": SpongeBob and Patrick stumble into Plankton's laboratory and consume some seemingly harmless snacks, turning them into hideous and damage-prone monsters. "Hot Pearl-tato": Mr. Krabs tries to find a babysitter for an infant Pearl, but she proves to be a real hassle, even for the campers.
7	7	"What About Meep?"	Supervising by : Sherm Cohen; Storyboarded by : Fred Osmond	Kaz	July 22, 2021	January 14, 2022	107	0.52
7	7	"Hard Time Out"	Supervising by : Dave Cunningham; Storyboarded by : John Trabbic	Kaz	July 22, 2021	January 14, 2022	107	0.52
"What About Meep?": SpongeBob and Patrick try to help an anchovy fish named Chovy find his own, unique personality. "Hard Time Out": Patrick accidentally gets SpongeBob sent to the time out room, so the former tries to break him out - little does he realize, SpongeBob is slowly becoming delusional and going insane.
8	8	"Pat's a Li'l Sinker"	Supervising by : Sherm Cohen; Storyboarded by : Kristen Morrison	Luke Brookshier	July 22, 2021	January 28, 2022	108	0.48
8	8	"Camp SpongeBob"	Supervising by : Dave Cunningham; Storyboarded by : Brian Morante	Kaz	July 22, 2021	February 4, 2022	108	0.27
"Pat's a Li'l Stinker": Mrs. Puff tries to teach Patrick how to swim. "Camp SpongeBob": SpongeBob misses the bus for the camp field trip, so he ends up forming his own camp with wild animals.
9	9	"Squisery"	Supervising by : Sherm Cohen; Storyboarded by : Fred Osmond	Andrew Goodman	July 22, 2021	February 11, 2022	109	0.40
9	9	"Game Night"	Supervising by : Dave Cunningham; Storyboarded by : Fred Osmond	Andrew Goodman	July 22, 2021	February 18, 2022	109	0.42
"Squisery": Patrick and a broken-legged Squidward get "stranded in the woods," (really only a few seconds away from camp) but the two begin to enjoy each other's company after taking shelter. "Game Night": Mr. Krabs, Plankton, and Mrs. Puff are desperate to avoid SpongeBob so they can endure in their game night.
10	10	"My Fair Nobby"	Supervising by : Sherm Cohen; Storyboarded by : Piero Piluso	Andrew Goodman	July 22, 2021	May 20, 2022	110	0.26
10	10	"Gimme a News Break"	Supervising by : Dave Cunningham; Storyboarded by : Kenny Pittenger	Mr. Lawrence	July 22, 2021	May 20, 2022	110	0.26
"My Fair Nobby": After hanging out with Miss Upturn and the folks in her cabin, Nobby's transformed into a snobby prestige. SpongeBob and Patrick have to help Narlene revive his country, hillbilly ways. "Gimme a News Break": Perch Perkins and Harvey report the news occurring around camp.
11	11	"Wise Kraken"	Supervising by : Sherm Cohen; Storyboarded by : Fred Osmond	Mr. Lawrence	July 22, 2021	July 22, 2022	111	0.36
11	11	"Squatch Swap"	Supervising by : Dave Cunningham; Storyboarded by : Mike Dougherty	Luke Brookshier	July 22, 2021	July 22, 2022	111	0.36
"Wise Kraken": It's time for the Kamp Koral comedy talent show, and everyone's got to prove their hilarity chops. "Squatch Swap": Patrick is accidentally confused for young sea-squatch Swampy while out in the woods. Patrick gets used to Swampy's family customs, while Swampy gets used to SpongeBob and Sandy's. When their true identities are realized, chaos is set to ensue.
12	12	"The Ho! Ho! Horror!"	Supervising by : Dave Cunningham; Storyboarded by : Brian Morante	Mr. Lawrence	July 22, 2021	December 3, 2021	112	0.34
12	12	"Outhouse Outrage"	Supervising by : Sherm Cohen; Storyboarded by : Kristen Morrison	Luke Brookshier	July 22, 2021	January 21, 2022	112	0.42
"The Ho! Ho! Horror!": Santa comes down to Bikini Bottom and he's ready to bring presents to the children of Kamp Koral, but his enlarged presence paints him as a giant monster. "Outhouse Outrage": When the camp outhouse explodes and dies as a result, Mr. Krabs interrogates SpongeBob, Patrick, and Squidward in a court case-like manner to find out who murdered it.
13	13	"Are You Afraid of the Dork?"	Supervising by : Sherm Cohen & Dave Cunningham; Storyboarded by : Brian Morante	Kaz	July 22, 2021	July 10, 2023	113	0.17
The Kamp counselors tell "scary" stories 'round the campfire, which are really only frightening to their lackluster tastes. The Flying Dutchman, watching from above in frustration, spooks the stories up tenfold and turns each of the counselors into scout badges - but SpongeBob and Patrick save the day by beating the Dutchman at his own game.
14	14	"Help Not Wanted"	Supervising by : Brandon Warren; Storyboarded by : Mike Dougherty	Ben Gruber	September 30, 2022	July 11, 2023	114	0.13
14	14	"Camp Spirit"	Storyboarded by : Tim Prendergast and Kurt Snyder	Ben Gruber	September 30, 2022	July 12, 2023	114	0.17
"Help Not Wanted": Patrick's dad Cecil from The Patrick Star Show comes down to Kamp Koral and wins the heart of each and every camper with his wacky, fun antics and happy-go-lucky attitude. Mr. Krabs gets frustrated by Cecil's sudden uprising and tries to take him down with help of Plankton and Mrs. Puff, but they end up wanting to keep him as a counselor too. "Camp Spirit": SpongeBob, Patrick, and Sandy meet ghost camper Maisey Maines (India de Beaufort) and they quickly become friends, but her love for frightening everyone makes her the target of Mrs. Puff, an ex-ghost hunter.
15	15	"Hill-Fu"	Supervising by : Brandon Warren; Storyboarded by : David Gemmill	Andrew Goodman	September 30, 2022	July 31, 2023	115	N/A
15	15	"Sun's Out, Fun's Out"	Supervising by : Brandon Warren; Storyboarded by : Mike Dougherty	Danny Giovannini	September 30, 2022	August 1, 2023	115	N/A
"Hill-Fu": Nobby helps train SpongeBob so he can defeat the ultra-skilled, supreme reign Sandy and earn a karate badge. "Sun's Out, Fun's Out": The Dinghy cabin members search for ways to beat the heat on the hottest day in camp, and the solution lies in Mr. Krabs' office, the only place around with an air conditioner.
16	16	"First and Last Aid"	Supervising by : Brandon Warren; Storyboarded by : Kurt Snyder	Bobby Gaylor	September 30, 2022	August 2, 2023	116	N/A
16	16	"Night of the Living Stench"	Supervising by : Brandon Warren; Storyboarded by : Mike Dougherty and Keegan Tsetta	Luke Brookshier	September 30, 2022	August 3, 2023	116	0.22
"First and Last Aid": Mr. Krabs hires Nurse Helga when injuries at camp begin to concern Mrs. Puff, but SpongeBob's accident-prone tendencies leave her in a rut. "Night of Living Stench": It's a match between dirty and clean when all the campers agree to not take showers, later in hopes of earning a badge - and Squidward's forced to fend for himself.
17	17	"Camp Crossbones"	Supervising by : Bob Camp and Brandon Warren; Storyboarded by : Mike Dougherty and Darrell Rooney	Antoine Guilbaud	September 30, 2022	July 22, 2024	117	N/A
17	17	"The Jelly Life"	Supervising by : Brandon Warren; Storyboarded by : Tim Prendergast and Keegan Tsetta	Kaz	September 30, 2022	July 22, 2024	117	N/A
"Camp Crossbones": SpongeBob, Patrick, and Sandy decide to turn their cabin into a pirate ship. "The Jelly Life": SpongeBob does research on jellyfish by pretending to be one himself.
18	18	"Lake Crashers"	Supervising by : Brandon Warren; Storyboarded by : Tim Prendergast	Bobby Gaylor	September 30, 2022	July 23, 2024	118	N/A
18	18	"Boo Light Special"	Supervising by : Bob Camp; Storyboarded by : Mike Dougherty	Mike Bell	September 30, 2022	July 23, 2024	118	N/A
"Lake Crashers": The campers hold a demolition derby at the bottom of the lake. Mrs. Puff finds out and joins the derby out of passion. "Boo Light Special": Camp Master Krabs hires the Flying Dutchman. Flying Dutchman puts a curse on store products. He regrets his actions when campers demand refunds. Flying Dutchman quits after the cursed store products attack him.
19	19	"Painting with Squidward"	Supervising by : Bob Camp; Storyboarded by : Mike Dougherty	Kaz	September 30, 2022	July 24, 2024	119	N/A
19	19	"Kamp Kow"	Supervising by : Jeff DeGrandis; Storyboarded by : John Sanford	Bobby Gaylor	September 30, 2022	July 25, 2024	119	N/A
"Painting with Squidward": Squidward is determined to win the art competition. "Kamp Kow": SpongeBob, Patrick, and Sandy befriend a cow that brings them good luck.
20	20	"Helter Shelter"	Supervising by : Brandon Warren; Storyboarded by : Tim Prendergast	Kaz	May 26, 2023	July 29, 2024	120	N/A
20	20	"Reveille Revolution"	Supervising by : Bob Camp and Jeff DeGrandis; Storyboarded by : Ken Mitchroney	Bobby Gaylor	May 26, 2023	July 30, 2024	120	N/A
"Helter Shelter": SpongeBob, Sandy, and Patrick are split up into different cabins. "Reveille Revolution": Squidward has to earn back his morning duties after an anchovy replaces his role as reveille.
21	21	"The Switch Glitch"	Supervising by : Brandon Warren; Storyboarded by : Nick Lauer and Kurt Snyder	Kaz	May 26, 2023	January 13, 2023	121	0.31
21	21	"Prickly Pests"	Supervising by : Bob Camp; Storyboarded by : John Sanford	Mike Bell	May 26, 2023	July 13, 2023	121	0.12
"The Switch Glitch": In the sole Kamp Koral segment featured within "The Tidal Zone" special, Patrick and Karen accidentally switch bodies when simultaneously consuming lightning berries. Karen (in Patrick's body) impresses SpongeBob and Sandy with her knowledge, while Patrick (in Karen's body) frustrates Plankton with his incompetence. Sandy attempts to solve things with an invention that will reverse the effects, but the star's refusal to cooperate sends everyone into a wild chase that leaves the entire camp wallowing in stupidity. Note: This episode continues a crossover event that begins on The Patrick Star Show season 1 episode 20 and SpongeBob SquarePants season 13 episode 12a, continues on SpongeBob SquarePants season 13 episode 12b, and concludes on SpongeBob SquarePants season 13 episode 12c. "Prickly Pests": Narlene attempts to prank Kamp Koral with little urchin Urnie, but things go wrong when he invites his other urchin friends to come over and they invade the camp.
22	22	"Are You Smarter Than a Smart Cabin?"	Supervising by : Jeff DeGrandis; Storyboarded by : Tim Prendergast	Mike Bell	May 26, 2023	July 31, 2024	122	N/A
22	22	"Deep Sea Despot"	Supervising by : Bob Camp; Storyboarded by : Mike Dougherty	Mike Bell	May 26, 2023	August 1, 2024	122	N/A
"Are You Smarter Than a Smart Cabin?": In order to avoid doing chores, Sandy invents a "smart cabin" named S.A.L. (Brian George) "Deep Sea Despot": Plankton serves food that causes Krabs, Plankton, and Mrs. Puff to get food poisoning. Squidward takes over as Camp Master.
23	23	"Regi-Hilled"	Supervising by : Brandon Warren; Storyboarded by : Mike Dougherty and Ken Mitchroney	Bobby Gaylor	May 26, 2023	August 6, 2024	123	N/A
23	23	"The Perfect Camper"	Supervising by : Bob Camp and Jeff DeGrandis; Storyboarded by : Dave Thomas	Bobby Gaylor	May 26, 2023	August 5, 2024	123	N/A
"Regi-Hilled": Narlene and Nobby teach Regigille backwoods living after he is fired by Miss Upturn. "The Perfect Camper": The Trawler cabin creates the perfect camper to win a competition.
24	24	"Eye of the Hotdog"	Supervising by : Bob Camp; Storyboarded by : Tim Prendergast	Mike Bell	May 26, 2023	August 7, 2024	124	N/A
24	24	"Patrick Takes the Cake"	Supervising by : Brandon Warren; Storyboarded by : Kurt Snyder	Kaz	May 26, 2023	August 8, 2024	124	N/A
"Eye of the Hotdog": Perch Perkins hosts a documentary about Craig Mammalton, who learns that he can't be the best at everything when he loses a hotdog-eating contest to Patrick. "Patrick Takes the Cake": When Patrick receives a cake in the mail, all of the other campers want it, so he takes the cake into the wilderness.
25	25	"The Taste of Defeat"	Supervising by : Jeff DeGrandis; Storyboarded by : Mike Dougherty	Bobby Gaylor	May 26, 2023	August 19, 2024	125	N/A
25	25	"Scaredy Squirrel"	Supervising by : Bob Camp; Storyboarded by : Fred Osmond	Mike Bell	May 26, 2023	August 20, 2024	125	N/A
"The Taste of Defeat": Narlene opens up a restaurant, much to Plankton's chagrin. So Plankton tries to put Narlene's restaurant out of business and win his customers back. "Scaredy Squirrel": Sandy spends the night at the Trawler Cabin with SpongeBob and Patrick.
26	26	"Hats Off to Space"	Supervising by : Brandon Warren; Storyboarded by : Tim Prendergast	Kaz	May 26, 2023	August 21, 2024	126	N/A
26	26	"In a Nut's Shell"	Supervising by : Dave Cunningham; Storyboarded by : Kurt Snyder	Bobby Gaylor	May 26, 2023	August 22, 2024	126	N/A
"Hats Off to Space": SpongeBob, Patrick, and Sandy go to outer space to retrieve the campers' hats, which have been stolen by Narlene and Nobby's cousin, Hatty McDoody (Jack McBrayer). "In a Nut's Shell": Narlene and Nobby disguise themselves as Mr. Krabs. Unfortunately, it is the camp Prank Day, and the two have to avoid the campers' pranks.

=== Season 2 (2024) ===
No. overall	No. in season	Title	Directed by	Written by	Original release date	Nickelodeon air date	Prod. code	U.S. linear viewers (millions)
27	1	"Mad Science Squirrel"	Supervising by : Keith Silva; Storyboarded by : Mike Dougherty	Mike Bell	July 10, 2024	February 14, 2025	201	N/A
27	1	"To Pop a Bubble"	Supervising by : Brandon Warren; Storyboarded by : Tim Prendergast	Luke Brookshier	July 10, 2024	February 14, 2025	201	N/A
"Mad Science Squirrel": Plankton judges campers' science fair projects, and Sandy's project catches his eye. He makes Sandy his lab assistant for his mayhem machine, but much to his dismay, Sandy removes all of the danger from the machine. "To Pop a Bubble": SpongeBob creates camper Bubble Buddy and introduces him to the other campers. However, Bubble Buddy is popped overnight, and SpongeBob gathers suspects to his cabin for an interrogation.
28	2	"High and Dry"	Supervising by : Howie Perry; Storyboarded by : Kurt Snyder	Bobby Gaylor	July 10, 2024	February 21, 2025	202	N/A
28	2	"The Beardsman"	Supervising by : Keith Silva; Storyboarded by : Mike Dougherty	Mike Bell	July 10, 2024	February 21, 2025	202	N/A
"High and Dry": SpongeBob, Patrick, Squidward, and Elwood spend the day on a surface island. "The Beardsman": A wilderness expert named Paul Grunion visits camp, but loses his manly powers after SpongeBob and Patrick take his beard and accidentally destroy it.
29	3	"Five Times the Fun"	Supervising by : Brandon Warren; Storyboarded by : Tim Prendergast	Andrew Goodman	July 10, 2024	February 28, 2025	203	N/A
29	3	"Low Falutin'"	Supervising by : Howie Perry; Storyboarded by : Kurt Snyder	Mike Bell	July 10, 2024	February 28, 2025	203	N/A
"Five Times the Fun": Patrick gets shredded into five different parts, and SpongeBob and Sandy try to take care of them all as they eventually wreak havoc on the camp. "Low Falutin'": Rea and Roh are kicked out of the Yacht cabin after their family's stocks are low. Krabs makes them do jobs around the camp, of which they get fired from each time. SpongeBob then tries to teach them how to be helpful without money.
30	4	"Nut Madness"	Supervising by : Keith Silva; Storyboarded by : Mike Dougherty	Andrew Goodman	July 10, 2024	March 7, 2025	204	N/A
30	4	"Mermaid Men and Barnacle Boys"	Supervising by : Brandon Warren; Storyboarded by : Tim Prendergast	Mike Bell	July 10, 2024	March 7, 2025	204	N/A
"Nut Madness": Sandy goes feral and buries the ice cream man in the ground, of which she has no memory of. The campers try to dig up the ice cream man so they can have more ice cream, to no avail. SpongeBob turns himself into a peanut to jog Sandy's memory, which causes her to bury everyone in camp. "Mermaid Men and Barnacle Boys": SpongeBob and Patrick and Kevin and Bubble Bass compete to see who plays the best Mermaid Man and Barnacle Boy. Sandy gives Elwood superpowers to create a supervillain for them to defeat, to which Elwood gets carried away with his power.
31	5	"A Tale of Two Roxies"	Supervising by : Howie Perry; Storyboarded by : Kurt Snyder	Bobby Gaylor	July 10, 2024	March 14, 2025	205	N/A
31	5	"Nite Owls"	Supervising by : Keith Silva; Storyboarded by : Bob Camp	Bobby Gaylor	July 10, 2024	March 14, 2025	205	N/A
"A Tale of Two Roxies": The conjoined twins Little Roxie and Big Roxie get split up after an argument, and they each try to live their own life. "Nite Owls": Getting bored at camp, SpongeBob, Patrick, and Sandy try to stay up all night.
32	6	"Calling Some Monsters"	Supervising by : Brandon Warren; Storyboarded by : Mike Dougherty	Mike Bell	July 10, 2024	March 21, 2025	206	N/A
32	6	"Dig This"	Supervising by : Howie Perry; Storyboarded by : Tim Prendergast	Bobby Gaylor	July 10, 2024	March 21, 2025	206	N/A
"Calling Some Monsters": SpongeBob and Patrick try to join a monster meeting, but cannot join as they are not monsters. Karen gives them the monster cupcakes from "Midnight Snack Attack" so they can turn back into monsters and join the meeting. However, the duo realize that the monsters are more dull than expected, so they try to get the monsters to channel their inner wild side. "Dig This": SpongeBob, Patrick, and Sandy discover a bone in the ground, which inspires Sandy to start an archaeology site. Unbeknownst to them, the bones are merely trash thrown out by Narlene and Nobby. Krabs tries to capitalize on the dig site and recruits other campers to complete the dinosaur skeleton.
33	7	"Un-Breaking and De-Entering"	Supervising by : Keith Silva; Storyboarded by : Kurt Snyder	Bobby Gaylor	July 10, 2024	March 28, 2025	207	N/A
33	7	"Swimmin' Holed"	Supervising by : Brandon Warren; Storyboarded by : Mike Dougherty	Mike Bell	July 10, 2024	March 28, 2025	207	N/A
"Un-Breaking and De-Entering": Gary gives SpongeBob anything that he desires. SpongeBob investigates and discovers Gary is stealing items from other cabins. SpongeBob and Patrick return everything Gary apparently stole to their owners. "Swimmin' Holed": Narlene and Nobby have a secret underground pool, of which SpongeBob discovers. Narlene allows SpongeBob to use it as long as he doesn't tell anyone else.
34	8	"Krabsy the Klown"	Supervising by : Howie Perry; Storyboarded by : Tim Prendergast	Bobby Gaylor	July 10, 2024	April 11, 2025	208	N/A
34	8	"Lords of the LARP"	Supervising by : Keith Silva; Storyboarded by : Kurt Snyder	Mike Bell	July 10, 2024	April 11, 2025	208	N/A
"Krabsy the Klown": Trying to entertain his daughter on her birthday, Krabs brings back his old persona Krabsy the Klown. However, Krabs starts to get carried away after keeping up the act for too long. "Lords of the LARP": Mo gets kicked out of the Frigate cabin and has to stay in the Pontoon cabin for a week. The Nerds get Mo invested in LARP (live-action roleplay), and the Jocks fight them in a game of LARP to win Mo back.
35	9	"Mascot Mayhem"	Supervising by : Brandon Warren; Storyboarded by : Kurt Snyder & Bob Camp	Andrew Goodman	July 10, 2024	April 18, 2025	209	N/A
35	9	"Putt Up or Shut Up"	Supervising by : Howie Perry; Storyboarded by : Mike Dougherty	Bobby Gaylor	July 10, 2024	April 18, 2025	209	N/A
"Mascot Mayhem": Patrick and SpongeBob compete for camp mascot, and SpongeBob gets chosen. Patrick then returns to compete with SpongeBob during a game of basketball. "Putt Up or Shut Up": Squidward and Mr. Krabs compete in a game of miniature golf to see who is the better golfer.
36	10	"Who's Complaining?"	Supervising by : Keith Silva; Storyboarded by : Kurt Snyder	Mike Bell	July 10, 2024	April 25, 2025	210	N/A
36	10	"Patrick's Star"	Supervising by : Brandon Warren; Storyboarded by : Fred Osmond	Andrew Goodman	July 10, 2024	April 25, 2025	210	N/A
"Who's Complaining?": Krabs makes Squidward the head of the complaints department after Squidward confronts him about the ignored complaints box. Squidward tries to fix everything in camp with the help of SpongeBob and Patrick. "Patrick's Star": Patrick gets a baby star for his birthday, of which falls out of the sky. Patrick tries to take care of the baby star, of which he names "Gunther". Patrick decides to let him go after realizing he is too dangerous to be at camp.
37	11	"A Finful of Sand Dollars"	Supervising by : Howie Perry; Storyboarded by : Mike Dougherty	Bobby Gaylor	July 10, 2024	September 12, 2025	211	N/A
37	11	"Cretins of the Night"	Supervising by : Keith Silva; Storyboarded by : Kurt Snyder	Mike Bell	July 10, 2024	September 12, 2025	211	N/A
"A Finful of Sand Dollars": It is Wild West Day at camp, and everything goes as normal until Narlene and Nobby show up to take everyone's candy. "Cretins of the Night": With the help of Kidferatu, SpongeBob and Patrick turn into vampires. The duo learn the ups and downs of being a vampire, and Nurse Helga tries to hunt them down.
38	12	"The Suit Suits You"	Supervising by : Brandon Warren; Storyboarded by : Erik Lechtenberg	Andrew Goodman	July 10, 2024	September 19, 2025	212	N/A
38	12	"Parasite Pals"	Supervising by : Howie Perry; Storyboarded by : Megan Ann Boyd	Bobby Gaylor	July 10, 2024	September 19, 2025	212	N/A
"The Suit Suits You": Sandy's suit starts to wear down, so she gets a new one to replace it with. However, her new suit turns out to be incredibly dangerous. Meanwhile, her old suit integrates into the wilderness. "Parasite Pals": SpongeBob notices a parasite in his body, and names him Paris. However, Paris (Kate Micucci) turns out to be a problem when he starts eating all food in sight, and Plankton and Nurse Helga try to capture him.
39	13	"End of Summer Daze"	Supervising by : Keith Silva; Storyboarded by : Mike Dougherty and Kurt Snyder	Andrew Goodman	July 10, 2024	September 26, 2025	213	N/A
It's the last day at camp, and the counselors are celebrating. The campers do last-minute things before they leave camp, and everyone eventually leaves except for SpongeBob and Patrick, who try to get SpongeBob to catch his first jellyfish. However, two criminals make their way to camp to smuggle money, and capture Patrick, who SpongeBob has to save.

== Reception ==
The show's announcement was met with backlash from fans when it was greenlit after the death of Hillenburg, who had previously expressed hesitation in deriving from the parent series.

Allie Leatherman of Legacy Press felt that the series overplays the slapstick for comedic purposes that children would not find funny. She also argues that, "The shadows are extremely harsh, the color palette is ugly, and the backgrounds are boring and lifeless. The animation makes it unclear if it even takes place underwater. The character design is alright other than Patrick, who just looks like pink mush in the shape of a star."

Jessica Curney of The Michigan Daily felt that the series is not needed and unnecessary for the franchise and that it does not have the same "spark" as the first three seasons of the original show.

Mikel J. Davies of The Harvard Crimson wrote that the show "seems to fall short of becoming a beloved classic like its predecessor" and that its comedy is "shallow and unremarkable, much unlike the original show", but praised the decision to keep the original show's main cast of characters and their voice actors, and remarked that "in general, Kamp Koral is an entertaining and enjoyable show", and that "there is hope as the show continues", as "some of the episodes had that familiar spark of creativity".

== Home media ==
Region	Set title	Season(s)	Aspect ratio	Episode count	Time length	Release date
1	Season 1, Volume 1	1	16:9	13	292 minutes	March 8, 2022
1	Season 1, Volume 2	1	16:9	13	294 minutes	December 5, 2023
1	Season 2	2	16:9	13	292 minutes	TBD
