= Sherm Cohen =

American screenwriter

- Education: Joe Kubert School of Graphic Design
- Occupations: Storyboard artist, director, writer
- Years active: 1989–present
- Known for: The Ren & Stimpy Show; Hey Arnold! SpongeBob SquarePants; Fish Hooks; Kick Buttowski: Suburban Daredevil

Sherm Cohen is an American storyboard artist, director, and writer. During college, Cohen worked as a cartoonist for his local newspaper. He got his start in animation at Nickelodeon on The Ren & Stimpy Show as a character layout artist, followed by a three-year stint on Hey Arnold! as storyboard artist and director.

== Career ==
Cohen was a writer, artist, and letterer for Nickelodeon Magazine from 1996 until the magazine ceased operations in 2009. He contributed dozens of comic strips and cover art featuring Nicktoons characters.

In early 1998, Cohen was invited by Stephen Hillenburg to be part of the original SpongeBob SquarePants crew. Cohen spent the first season on the show as storyboard artist, writer, and director. He then moved up to Storyboard Supervisor for the next three seasons of SpongeBob SquarePants. Cohen also co-wrote the "F.U.N." and "Texas" songs for the show.

Cohen was also lead storyboard artist and a character designer on The SpongeBob SquarePants Movie. Cohen described his time on SpongeBob to an interviewer by saying, "People often ask about what it was like working on SpongeBob, and it's hard to give an answer that really captures the moment." He has a character named after him in the show.

After the fourth season, Cohen left Nickelodeon to write and illustrate his first book for Walter Foster Publications, "Cartooning: Character Design".

Cohen also began teaching classes in storyboarding at the Entertainment Art Academy in Pasadena, California. Some of this material was turned into an instructional DVD on how to storyboard called, "Storyboard Elements." In December 2008, "Storyboard Elements" instructional DVD reached its 2nd edition and fourth pressing.

After working at Cartoon Network for a year, Cohen went to work at the Disney Television Animation, writing and drawing storyboards for Phineas and Ferb. After Phineas and Ferb's first season, Cohen returned to Nickelodeon for the first season of The Mighty B! as storyboard artist. In 2008, Cohen was back at Disney working on the second season of Phineas and Ferb as storyboard artist/writer. During this time, he also wrote some songs for the show: "X-Ray Eyes," "Bubble Gum," and "Aren't You a Little Young?"

From 2009–2010, Cohen worked on Disney's Kick Buttowski: Suburban Daredevil as storyboard supervisor, story editor, and director. In 2011, he received a nomination for a daytime Emmy Award for "Outstanding Directing in an Animated Program".

Cohen created "Storyboard Secrets", a comprehensive DVD/online guide to storyboarding.

From 2010–2013, Cohen worked on Disney's Fish Hooks as storyboard supervisor. The pet store owner character "Bud" on the show is a photo collage version of Cohen. He's also written the song "Earth Troll Rap" for the show.

During 2013–2014, Cohen worked on The SpongeBob Movie: Sponge Out of Water as sequence supervisor.

In January 2015, Cohen returned to work on the SpongeBob SquarePants show. His favorite SpongeBob character is Patrick Star.

== Filmography ==
=== Film ===
Year	Film	Notes
2003	My Life with Morrissey	Storyboard Artist
2004	The SpongeBob SquarePants Movie	Lead Storyboard Artist/Character Designer
2015	The SpongeBob Movie: Sponge Out of Water	Sequence Supervisor

=== Television ===
Year	Film	Notes
1994–1995	The Ren & Stimpy Show	Layout artist
1996–2002	Hey Arnold!	Assistant storyboard artist (1996–1997); Storyboard artist (1996–2001); Storyboard director (1996–2000); Director (1996–1999); Writer (1999)
1998	The Amanda Show	Art director Storyboard artist
1999–2006, 2015–present	SpongeBob SquarePants	Writer and Storyboard director (1999–2001); Storyboard supervisor (2000–2006, 2015–2016); Supervising director (2016–present)
2005–2006	My Gym Partner's a Monkey	Storyboard artist
2007–2009	Phineas and Ferb	Storyboard artist Writer
2008–2009	The Mighty B!	Storyboard artist
2009–2010	Kick Buttowski: Suburban Daredevil	Storyboard supervisor Story editor Storyboard artist Storyboard director
2010–2014	Fish Hooks	Storyboard supervisor Storyboard artist Writer
2021	Kamp Koral: SpongeBob's Under Years	Supervising director
2021–2023	The Patrick Star Show	Supervising director

== Bibliography ==
- Cohen, Sherm (2006). Cartooning: Character Design. Irvine, CA: Walter Foster Publishing. ISBN 9781560109679. OCLC 828514382.
