= The Patrick Star Show =

American animated television series

- Genre: Comedy
- Based on: Characters created by Stephen Hillenburg
- Developed by: Luke Brookshier; Marc Ceccarelli; Andrew Goodman; Kaz; Mr. Lawrence; Vincent Waller
- Voices of: Bill Fagerbakke; Thomas F. Wilson; Cree Summer; Jill Talley; Dana Snyder; Tom Kenny
- Theme music composer: Ego Plum
- Composers: Nicolas Carr; Sage Guyton; Ego Plum; Eban Schletter; Jeremy Wakefield
- Country of origin: United States
- Original language: English
- No. of seasons: 6
- No. of episodes: 83 (list of episodes)

Production
- Running time: 22 minutes (11 minutes per segment)
- Production companies: United Plankton Pictures, Inc. Nickelodeon Animation Studio

Original release
- Network: Nickelodeon
- Release: July 9, 2021 – present

Related
- SpongeBob SquarePants; Kamp Koral: SpongeBob's Under Years

The Patrick Star Show is an American animated television series that premiered on Nickelodeon on July 9, 2021. It is a spin-off of the Stephen Hillenburg series SpongeBob SquarePants. It follows Patrick Star as he hosts a talk show at his family home with the help of his family. The series was developed by Luke Brookshier, Marc Ceccarelli, Andrew Goodman, Kaz, Mr. Lawrence, and Vincent Waller.

In August 2020, it was announced that SpongeBob would be receiving its second spinoff series, following Kamp Koral: SpongeBob's Under Years, with Patrick as its lead character. In March 2021, the series was officially picked up for a 13-episode first season, which was later expanded to 26 episodes in July 2021. For the series, the writers wanted to bend the rules of the original SpongeBob series even further and divert away from traditional story structures.

The series has run for a total of five seasons; in October 2024, the show was renewed for a third production cycle, containing the fourth and fifth seasons, with the fourth premiering on March 21, 2025, and the fifth premiering on July 17, 2026. In June 2026, the series was renewed for a fourth production cycle, containing the sixth and seventh seasons, with the sixth premiering on October 30, 2026.

== Premise ==
Set an unspecified amount of time before SpongeBob SquarePants, a young-adult Patrick Star hosts a variety show from his home with the support of his family and other neighbors, while getting into all sorts of situations in-and-out of the show.

Each episode features various commercials as well as other characters such as many alternate counterparts of Patrick: Cave Patrick, Pat the Hapless, Pat-Tron, and Pat-gor. Some episodes feature segments that focus on other characters, including the stop-motion Dr. Plankenstein and the science fiction UPA-styled Captain Quasar. Other styles are represented such as in the rubber house style of The Kelpbed Kids. Additionally, some episodes have the Star family using a time machine closet to travel through many periods and dimensions.

== Characters ==
- Patrick Star (voiced by Bill Fagerbakke), the host of The Patrick Show
- Cecil Star (voiced by Tom Wilson), the father of Patrick Star who works at the Undersea Space Agency
- Bunny Star (voiced by Cree Summer), the mother of Patrick Star
- Squidina Star (voiced by Jill Talley), a squid who is the adopted sister of Patrick Star that helps in the production of The Patrick Show
- GrandPat Star (voiced by Dana Snyder), the grandfather of Patrick Star and father of Cecil who is the intelligent member of the Star family and uses a mobility scooter as his mode of transportation
- Ouchie (vocal effects provided by Tom Kenny), the Star family's pet sea urchin.
- Tinkle (vocal effects provided by Dee Bradley Baker), a sentient and animalistic toilet that is the Star family's other pet.
- Grandma Tentacles (voiced by Cree Summer), an octopus who is the Star family's neighbor and Squidward's grandmother. She was previously portrayed by Mary Jo Catlett in the original series

Characters from the original series — including SpongeBob SquarePants (voiced by Tom Kenny), Squidward Tentacles (voiced by Rodger Bumpass), Sandy Cheeks (voiced by Carolyn Lawrence), Mr. Krabs (voiced by Clancy Brown), Pearl Krabs (voiced by Lori Alan), Mrs. Puff (voiced by Mary Jo Catlett), Plankton (voiced by Mr. Lawrence), and Karen (voiced by Jill Talley) — also appear in guest roles.

== Production ==
SpongeBob SquarePants creator Stephen Hillenburg was asked about the potentiality of spinoffs in a 2009 interview. In response he remarked, "The show is about SpongeBob, he's the core element, and it's about how he relates to the other characters. Patrick by himself might be a bit too much. So I don't see any spin-offs."

According to showrunner Marc Ceccarelli, the writers of The Patrick Star Show bent the rules of the original SpongeBob universe to allow for more creative freedom. Ceccarelli explained: "We really tried to just do anything we wanted... We mess with canon [the original series' continuity] a lot. I don't know if anybody knows this, but we don't really respect canon just for the sake of itself." The writers also aimed to "sideline" story structures, which "frees [them] up to be more surreal and randomly bizarre with the kinds of things [they] put out there."

In August 2020, it was announced that SpongeBob SquarePants would be receiving its second spinoff series, following at the summer camp, and that the focus of the series would be on Patrick Star. In March 2021, it was announced that Nickelodeon had ordered 13 episodes, with the series set to release in summer 2021. In May 2021, it was announced that the series would premiere in July 2021, and the first teaser trailer for the series was released. In June 2021, it was announced that the series would premiere on July 9, 2021.

In August 2021, it was announced that Nickelodeon had ordered 13 additional episodes for the series, bringing the series to 26 produced episodes. In March 2022, Nickelodeon renewed the series for a 26-episode second season, which premiered on July 26, 2023. In July 2022, a "SpongeBob Universe" crossover special was announced, featuring the main series and spinoffs The Patrick Star Show and Kamp Koral. "The Tidal Zone", a spoof of The Twilight Zone, was originally set to premiere on Nickelodeon on November 25, 2022, before being delayed and rescheduled for release on January 13, 2023. In October 2024, the series was renewed for a fourth and fifth season. On June 9, 2026, the series was renewed for a sixth and seventh season.

== Episodes ==
Season	Episodes	Segments	Originally released	
Season	Episodes	Segments	First released	Last released
1	26	50	July 9, 2021	July 25, 2023
2	13	26	July 26, 2023	July 25, 2024
3	13 (Note: The season contains the last 13 episodes of the Season 2 production cycle.)	23	July 29, 2024	December 24, 2024
4	13 (Note: The season contains the first 13 episodes of the Season 3 production cycle.)	25	March 21, 2025	July 10, 2026
5	14 (Note: The season contains the last 13 episodes of the Season 3 production cycle, and one episode of the Season 4 production cycle.)	27	July 17, 2026	October 23, 2026
6	12 (Note: The season contains the first 13 episodes of the Season 4 production cycle. Despite this, one of them is listed in the upper season.)	TBA	October 30, 2026	TBA

== Home media and streaming ==
The first season was added to Paramount+ on July 10, 2024, alongside the thirteenth season of SpongeBob SquarePants and the second and final season of Kamp Koral: SpongeBob's Under Years to celebrate the 25th anniversary of the SpongeBob franchise.

Region	Set title	Season(s)	Aspect ratio	Episode count	Time length	Release date
1	Season 1, Volume 1	1	16:9	13	293 minutes	June 21, 2022
1	Season 1, Volume 2	1	16:9	13	294 minutes	December 5, 2023

== Reception ==
The show's announcement was initially met with backlash from fans when it was greenlit after the death of Hillenburg, who had previously expressed hesitation in deriving from the parent series.

Marty Brown of Common Sense Media gave the series a 4 out of 5 star rating, praising it for setting itself apart from the main SpongeBob series with its fast-paced nature and disregard for linear storytelling. He wrote, "The furiously kinetic series is just a relentless series of jokes and sight gags, with little regard for things like plot or continuity. In other words, it's a lot of fun, especially for folks who are already fans of the original series." Brandon Zachary of CBR similarly praised the series' even less restrained and madcap energy, saying that it had more in common with Pee-wee's Playhouse than SpongeBob. He directed additional praise to Jill Talley for her voice performance as Squidina and wrote that her "earnest attitude helps paper over some of the more unwieldy elements of such a purposefully unstructured series."

=== Accolades ===
Award	Date of ceremony	Category	Recipient(s)	Result	Ref.
Annie Awards	February 8, 2025	Outstanding Achievement for Character Animation in an Animated Television / Broadcast Production	Colin Lepper (for "Something Stupid This Way Comes")	Nominated	
