= Marc Ceccarelli =

American animator (born 1968)

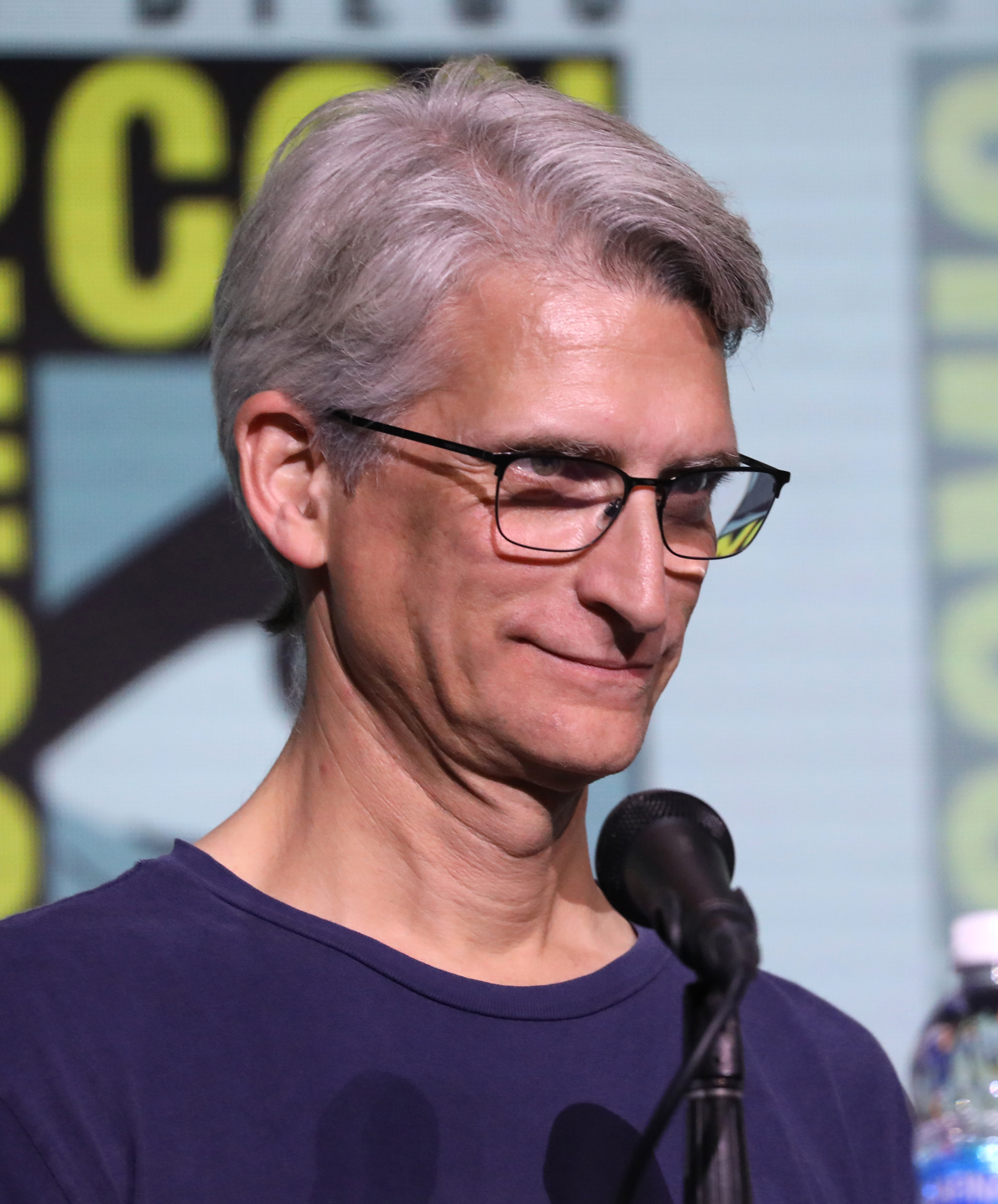
- Ceccarelli in 2024
- Born: Marc Scott Ceccarelli; January 4, 1968 (age 57); Bakersfield, California, U.S.
- Occupations: Animator, storyboard artist, supervising producer, writer
- Years active: 2008–present
- Known for: SpongeBob SquarePants

Marc Scott Ceccarelli (born January 4, 1968) is an American animator, director, producer, and writer. He won the 2018 British Academy Children's Awards in International Animation, and the 2018 Daytime Emmy Award in Outstanding Children's Animated Series for his work on Nickelodeon's SpongeBob SquarePants.

== Filmography ==
=== Television ===
Year	Title	Role
2008	Phineas and Ferb	Writer and Storyboard Artist ("Traffic Cam Caper")
2009	The Drinky Crow Show	Storyboard Artist
2011–present	SpongeBob SquarePants	Writer, Storyboard Director (2011–14), Showrunner (2015–present), Supervising Producer (2015–18), Co-Executive Producer (2018–22), Executive Producer (2022–present)
2013–2016	Uncle Grandpa	Writer and Storyboard Artist
2021–2024	Kamp Koral: SpongeBob's Under Years	Developer, Showrunner, Co-Executive Producer
2021–present	The Patrick Star Show	Developer, Showrunner, Co-Executive Producer

=== Film ===
Year	Title	Role
2015	The SpongeBob Movie: Sponge Out of Water	Storyboard Artist
2024	Saving Bikini Bottom: The Sandy Cheeks Movie	Executive Producer
2025	Plankton: The Movie	Executive Producer
2025	The SpongeBob Movie: Search for SquarePants	Story Writer, Executive Producer
