= Bill Fagerbakke =

American actor (born 1957)

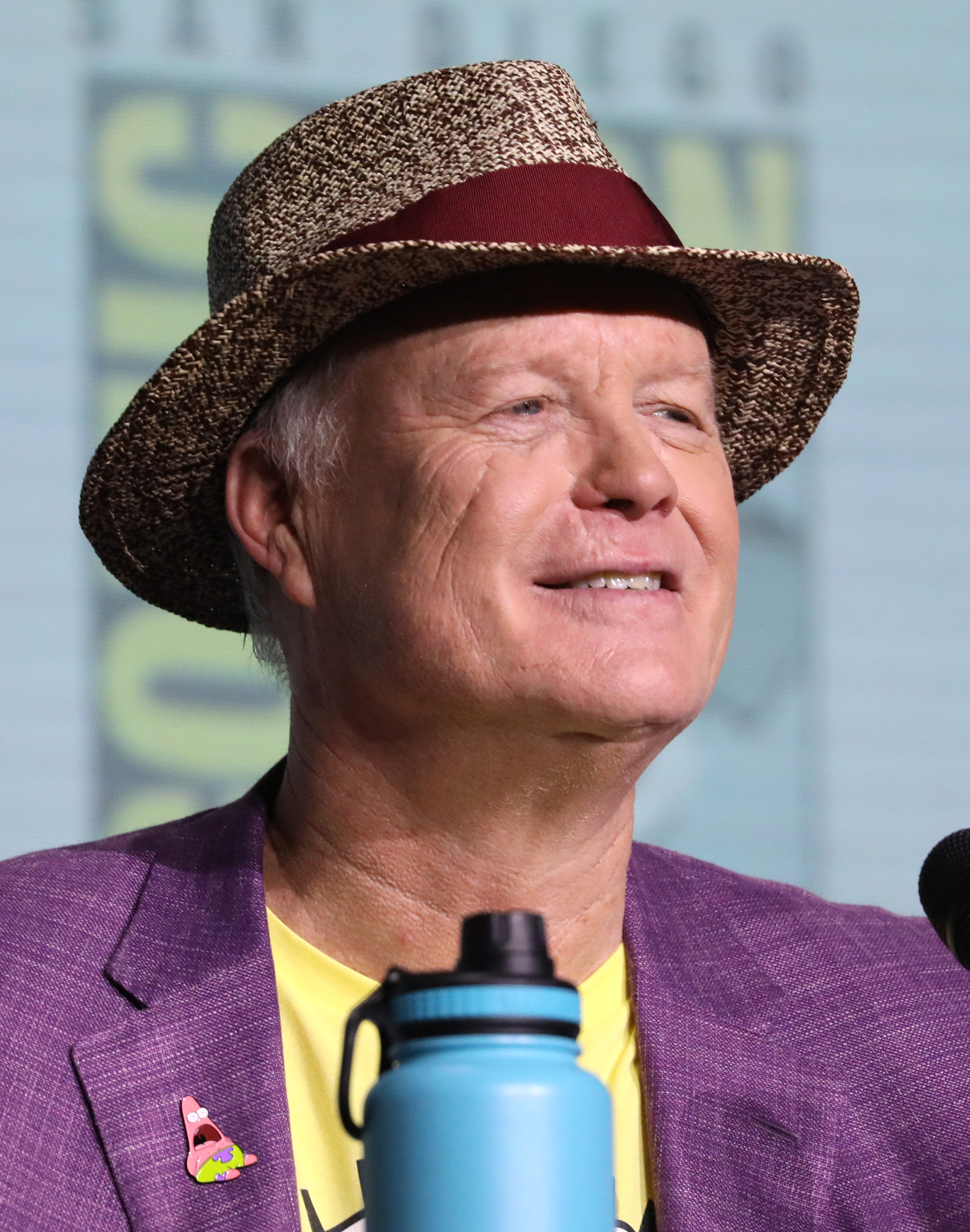
- Fagerbakke at the 2024 San Diego Comic-Con
- Born: William Fagerbakke; October 4, 1957 (age 69); Fontana, California, U.S.
- Education: University of Idaho (BA); Southern Methodist University (MFA)
- Occupations: Actor; voice actor
- Years active: 1984–present
- Spouse: Catherine McClenahan (m. 1989; sep. 2012)
- Children: 2

William Fagerbakke (/ˈfeɪɡərbɑːki/ FAYG-ər-bahk-ee; born October 4, 1957) is an American actor. He voices Patrick Star in the SpongeBob SquarePants franchise, and played Michael "Dauber" Dybinski on the sitcom Coach. He also appeared in 12 episodes of the sitcom How I Met Your Mother as Marshall Eriksen's father Marvin.

== Early life and education ==
Fagerbakke was born on October 4, 1957, in Fontana, California, and moved to Rupert, Idaho, as a youth. He graduated from Minico High School in Rupert in 1975, where he was a three-sport athlete for the Spartans in football, basketball, and track.

Although he had multiple scholarship offers for college football, including Pac-8 schools, Fagerbakke decided to stay in state and attended the University of Idaho in Moscow. He was a defensive lineman for the Vandals and was ticketed to redshirt in 1976, but was called into action in the fourth game of his sophomore season. The Vandals went 7–4 in 1976, their first winning season in five years, and were 5–2 in the seven games that Fagerbakke started. Head coach Ed Troxel planned on moving him to the offensive line in 1977, but a knee injury in spring drills ended Fagerbakke's athletic career, which turned his focus to theater.

Fagerbakke's first theatrical role was in a campus production of Godspell. He was a member of the Delta Tau Delta fraternity and earned his bachelor's degree in 1981, a result of "two years of football and four years of school." He later attended graduate school at Southern Methodist University in Dallas, Texas.

== Career ==
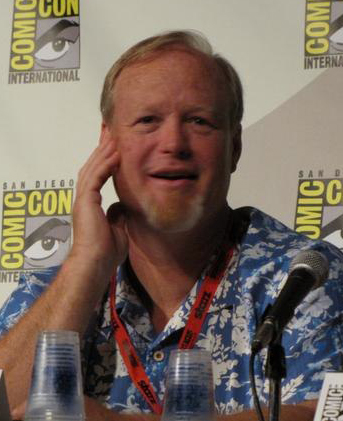
Fagerbakke in 2009

Fagerbakke has appeared on television in roles such as assistant coach "Dauber" Dybinski on Coach, and in films, including Funny Farm. He had a role as the mentally disabled Tom Cullen in the 1994 mini-series Stephen King's The Stand. From 1994 to 1996, he had main and recurring roles as Broadway / Hollywood in Gargoyles. From 1996 to 1999 he played Alan Parish in the Jumanji TV series. In 1999, he had a role in HBO's original series Oz as Officer Karl Metzger.

His character on Coach was based on a former assistant coach at Idaho, a graduate assistant nicknamed "Tuna."

He has appeared in numerous live action and animated films. With his first appearance coming in Perfect Strangers in 1984 where he played Carl. He has since appeared in films such as Loose Cannons, Halloween II, Rosewood Lane and Baby Makers.

From 2001 to 2004, Fagerbakke had a main role as Kurt Blobberts in Lloyd in Space. He also had multiple reoccurring roles in the 2007, series Transformers: Animated.

He has lent his voice to many other animated shows such as American Dad, The Grim Adventures of Billy & Mandy, Batman: The Brave and the Bold, All Hail King Julien, Kim Possible, Duck Tales and Young Justice.

In 2007, he made a cameo appearance on the show Heroes as Steve Gustavson in the episodes "Run" and "Unexpected." In 2009, he had a role in the film Jennifer's Body. From 2005 to 2014, he had a recurring role as Marvin Eriksen Sr. on the CBS sitcom How I Met You Mother. In 2012, he made a cameo appearance in the TV show Weeds. He guest started as Ken Fisher in four episodes of the NBC series Growing Up Fisher. In 2015, it was announced Fagerbakke would reprise his role as coach Dyninski on NBC’s Coach revival, however the proposed revival was quickly cancelled. In 2017, he guest started in Blackish in the episode "One Angry Man". Fagerbakke had another recurring role as Chris Beverly in the Showtime series I Am Dying Up Here.

In 2019, Fagerbakke portrayed Detective Pruitt on Netflix Unbelievable. He played Officer Jake on Young Sheldon from 2021 to 2023. In 2022, Fagerbakke guest-starred in the fifth season of Dynasty as Peter de Viblis. His daughter Carson portrays Peter's daughter Patty.

=== SpongeBob SquarePants ===
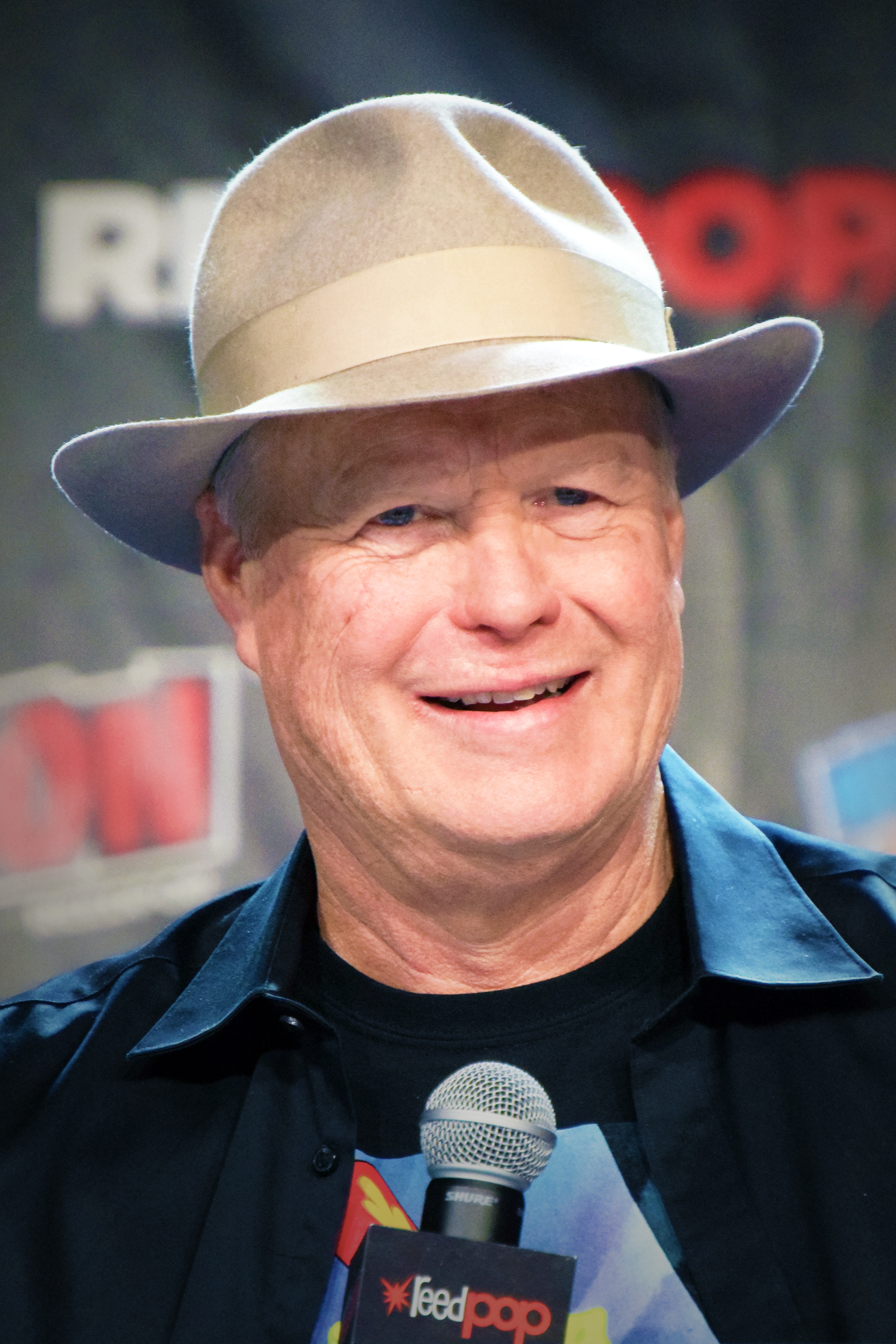
Fagerbakke at New York Comic Con 2022

Since 1997, he has provided the voice of Patrick Star for the Nicktoon SpongeBob SquarePants. His role as Patrick has become one of the most iconic in all of animation. He has also been compared to the character's real-life counterpart as show writer Kent Osborne once said of Fagerbakke, "He is this big guy, and he plays Patrick so well. He's just this big guy, and he lumbers around."

In 2004, Fagerbakke voiced Patrick in The SpongeBob SquarePants Movie, along with subsequent films The SpongeBob Movie: Sponge Out of Water, The SpongeBob Movie: Sponge on the Run, and The SpongeBob Movie: Search for SquarePants. He also voices the character in video games and spinoffs, such as Kamp Koral.

The television show celebrated its 20th anniversary in 2019. In celebration, a television special was aired, titled "SpongeBob's Big Birthday Blowout". One scene includes each of the show's main characters' voice actors portraying live-action versions of their characters. While not the first SpongeBob SquarePants episode that blended animated sequences with live-action characters, this was the first time that the characters' voice actors have played a live-action scene all together.

Since 2021, Fagerbakke has been the lead role in the SpongeBob SquarePants spinoff The Patrick Star Show, reprising his role as Patrick.

Super Bowl LVIII, which took place in 2024, was broadcast on CBS; the network's parent company Paramount also owns Nickelodeon, the network that airs SpongeBob SquarePants. As part of a plan to maximize the use of its broadcasting rights partnership with the National Football League (NFL), Paramount decided to air an "alternative" Super Bowl telecast on Nickelodeon that was aimed to be more family-friendly. The channel's website claimed that the broadcast was intended for "kids of all ages, from 2 to 102". The broadcast on Nickelodeon was hosted by Nate Burleson and Noah Eagle in live-action and accompanying them were SpongeBob and Patrick. Bill Fagerbakke and SpongeBob's voice actor Tom Kenny voiced the characters in real-time, improvising their own jokes in-character, and also utilized motion capture.

Fagerbakke and Kenny also hosted the 2024 Kids Choice Awards as SpongeBob and Patrick. They voiced their characters while being filmed backstage via motion capture, marking the first time the ceremony has been hosted by animated characters.

== Personal life ==
In 1989, Fagerbakke married actress Catherine McClenahan, with whom he had two daughters, one of which is actress Carson Fagerbakke. In September 2012, he filed for legal separation from McClenahan, citing irreconcilable differences. He has lived in Los Angeles ever since filming the show Coach, however he visits Idaho often. He enjoys spending time with his grandchild. Through his daughter Carson, Fagerbakke's son-in-law is actor Scott Michael Foster.

In 1997, Bill Fagerbakke returned to his alma mater—the University of Idaho to star in benefit performances of the play Love Letters, staged by the Idaho Repertory Theatre to support the university's theater program.

Fagerbakke is good friends with his SpongeBob SquarePants co-star Tom Kenny.

== Filmography ==
=== Television voice roles ===
Year	Title	Role	Notes	Source
1990	3×3 Eyes	Steve Long		
1994	Beethoven	Caesar / Roger's Dad	Main cast	
1994–1996	Gargoyles	Broadway / Hollywood	Main cast (season 1), recurring role (season 2)	
1994–1995	Aaahh!!! Real Monsters	Troop Leader / Tiny / Carl	3 episodes	
1995–1996	Dumb and Dumber	Harry Dunne, various voices	Main cast	
1996–1999	Jumanji	Alan Parrish	Main cast	
1999–present	SpongeBob SquarePants	Patrick Star, additional voices	Main cast	
1999	Timon & Pumbaa	Bigfoot	Episode: "Bigfoot, Littlebrain"	
1999	The Wild Thornberrys	Dank	Episode: "On the Right Track"	
1999	The Night of the Headless Horseman	Dolphus	Television film	
1999–2000	Roughnecks: Starship Troopers Chronicles	Sgt. Gossard	Main cast	
2000	Batman Beyond	Payback	Episode: "Payback"	
2001–2004	Lloyd in Space	Kurt Blobberts	Main cast	
2002	Final Fantasy: Unlimited	Fungus		
2002	Jackie Chan Adventures	Butch	Episode: "Pleasure Cruise"	
2005	The Grim Adventures of Billy & Mandy	Thud, Grandpa, Clerk	Episode: "The Firebird Sweet"	
2005–2006	A.T.O.M.	Flesh		
2007	Family Guy	Patrick Star	Episode: "Road to Rupert"; archival footage (uncredited)	
2007	Kim Possible	Myron	Episode: "Larry's Birthday"	
2007–2009	Transformers Animated	Bulkhead, Master Disaster, Hot Shot, additional voices	Recurring role	
2009	The Spectacular Spider-Man	Morris Bench	Episode: "Shear Strength"	
2010	Batman: The Brave and the Bold	Ronnie Raymond, Lead, Helium	4 episodes	
2010–2011	Sym-Bionic Titan	Meat	5 episodes	
2011–2022	Young Justice	Bear	3 episodes	
2011–2022	Handy Manny	Roland	2 episodes	
2012	Robot and Monster	Lev Krumholtz	2 episodes	
2013–2016	Wander Over Yonder	Prince Cashmere, additional voices	3 episodes	
2015–2017	All Hail King Julien	King Joey, Lazy Doug, Hans, Rat DJ, Leonard	9 episodes	
2017	Pig Goat Banana Cricket	Banana's Dad	Episode: "Flowers for Burgerstein"	
2017	American Dad!	Strannix	Episode: "The Long Bomb"	
2017–2020	Dorothy and the Wizard of Oz	Scarecrow, various voices	Main cast	
2018	DuckTales	Ghost of Christmas Present	Episode: "Last Christmas!"	
2021–2024	Kamp Koral: SpongeBob's Under Years	Patrick Star, additional voices	Main cast	
2021–present	The Patrick Star Show	Patrick Star, Pat-gor, Pat-Tron, additional voices	Lead role	

=== Video games ===
Year	Title	Role	Notes	Source
1996	Disney's Animated Storybook: The Hunchback of Notre Dame	Oafish Guard		
2000	Nicktoons Racing	Patrick Star	Archival recordings	
2001	Nicktoons Nick Tunes	Patrick Star		
2001	SpongeBob SquarePants: Operation Krabby Patty	Patrick Star		
2001	SpongeBob SquarePants: SuperSponge	Patrick Star		
2002	SpongeBob SquarePants: Employee of the Month	Patrick Star		
2002	SpongeBob SquarePants: Revenge of the Flying Dutchman	Patrick Star		
2003	Nickelodeon Toon Twister 3-D	Patrick Star		
2003	SpongeBob SquarePants: Battle for Bikini Bottom	Patrick Star		
2004	SpongeBob SquarePants: Typing	Patrick Star		
2004	Nicktoons Movin'	Patrick Star		
2004	The SpongeBob SquarePants Movie	Patrick Star		
2005	SpongeBob SquarePants: Lights, Camera, Pants!	Patrick Star		
2005	Nicktoons Unite!	Patrick Star		
2006	SpongeBob SquarePants: Creature from the Krusty Krab	Patrick Star		
2006	Nicktoons: Battle for Volcano Island	Patrick Star		
2006	Spongebob SquarePants: Nighty Nightmare	Patrick Star		
2007	Nicktoons: Attack of the Toybots	Patrick Star		
2007	SpongeBob's Atlantis SquarePantis	Patrick Star		
2008	SpongeBob SquarePants Featuring Nicktoons: Globs of Doom	Patrick Star		
2009	SpongeBob's Truth or Square	Patrick Star		
2010	SpongeBob's Boating Bash	Patrick Star		
2011	Nicktoons MLB	Patrick Star		
2011	SpongeBob's Surf & Skate Roadtrip	Patrick Star		
2013	SpongeBob SquarePants: Plankton's Robotic Revenge	Patrick Star, Clem		
2015	SpongeBob HeroPants	Patrick Star		
2020	SpongeBob SquarePants: Battle for Bikini Bottom – Rehydrated	Patrick Star	Archival recordings	
2021	Nickelodeon All-Star Brawl	Patrick Star	Voiceover added in the June 2022 update	
2022	Nickelodeon Extreme Tennis	Patrick Star		
2022	Nickelodeon Kart Racers 3: Slime Speedway	Patrick Star		
2023	SpongeBob SquarePants: The Cosmic Shake	Patrick Star		
2023	Nickelodeon All-Star Brawl 2	Patrick Star		
2024	SpongeBob SquarePants: The Patrick Star Game	Patrick Star		
2025	SpongeBob SquarePants: Titans of the Tide	Patrick Star		
2026	Fortnite Battle Royale	Patrick Star		

=== Television live-action roles ===
Year	Title	Role	Notes	Source
1989–1997	Coach	Michael "Dauber" Dybinski		
1994	The Stand	Tom Cullen	Miniseries	
1997	Sabrina the Teenage Witch	Dirk	Episode: "Cat Showdown"	
1998–1999	Oz	Karl Metzger	3 episodes	
2005–2014	How I Met Your Mother	Marvin Eriksen Sr.	12 episodes	
2007	According to Jim	Howard	Episode: "All the Rage"	
2012	Weeds	Police Academy Instructor	Episode: "Allosaurus Crush Castle"	
2014	Growing Up Fisher	Ken Fisher	4 episodes	
2014	Crash & Bernstein	Jeff	Episode: "Escape from Bigfoot Island"	
2016	All In with Cam Newton	Himself	Episode: "All In with Josh"	
2017	Black-ish	Tom Avery	Episode: "One Angry Man"	
2018	Mom	Sergeant Gene Rubenzer	Episode: "Phone Confetti and a Wee Dingle"	
2018	I'm Dying Up Here	Chris Beverly	3 episodes	
2019	Unbelievable	Detective Pruitt	3 episodes	
2021–2023	Young Sheldon	Officer Jake	4 episodes	
2022	Dynasty	Peter de Viblis	Episode: "Devoting All of Her Energy to Hate"	

=== Film ===
Year	Title	Role	Notes	Source
1984	Perfect Strangers	Carl		
1987	The Secret of My Success	Ron		
1988	Funny Farm	Lon Criterion		
1990	Loose Cannons	Giant		
1992	Porco Rosso	Mamma Aiuto Gangster (voice)		
1996	The Hunchback of Notre Dame	Oafish Guard (voice)		
1997	Under Wraps	Harold, Ted		
2000	The Ultimate Christmas Present	Sparky	Television film	
2001	Lady and the Tramp II: Scamp's Adventure	Mooch (voice)	Direct-to-video	
2002	Ken Park	Bob		
2003	Atlantis: Milo's Return	Sven (voice)	Direct-to-video	
2003	Quigley	Security Guard Londo		
2004	The SpongeBob SquarePants Movie	Patrick Star, Various voices (voice)		
2005	Balto III: Wings of Change	Ralph, Mr. Conner (voice)		
2005	The Madagascar Penguins in a Christmas Caper	Ted the Polar Bear (voice)	Short film	
2005	The Legend of Frosty the Snowman	Frosty the Snowman (voice)	Direct-to-video	
2008	Finding Amanda	Larry		
2009	Space Buddies	Pi		
2009	Halloween II	Deputy Webb		
2009	Jennifer's Body	Jonas' Dad		
2011	The Artist	Policeman		
2011	Rosewood Lane	Hank Hawthorne		
2012	The Babymakers	Clark		
2015	The SpongeBob Movie: Sponge Out of Water	Patrick Star, Various voices (voice)		
2021	The SpongeBob Movie: Sponge on the Run	Patrick Star (voice)		
2024	Saving Bikini Bottom: The Sandy Cheeks Movie	Patrick Star, Bikini Bottomites (voice)		
2025	Plankton: The Movie	Patrick Star, Troop (voice)		
2025	The SpongeBob Movie: Search for SquarePants	Patrick Star (voice)		

=== Other ===
- Jimmy Neutron's Nicktoon Blast (2003) - Patrick Star
- SpongeBob 4D (2005) - Patrick Star
- SpongeBob SquarePants 4D: The Great Jelly Rescue (2013) - Patrick Star

== Accolades ==
Kids choice awards

In 2009 Fagerbakke was nominated for at the 2009 for Best Burp at the Kids' Choice Awards (shared with Tom Kenny), for their performances as SpongeBob and Patrick. In 2014 Fagerbakke won Favorite Animated Animal Sidekick as Patrick Star on SpongeBob SquarePants.

Behind the Voice Actors (BTVA) Awards

In 2013 Fargerbakke was nominated as a part of the Best Vocal Ensemble in a TV Series (Children's/Educational) in SpongeBob SquarePants, and in 2016 he was nominated as a part of Best Vocal Ensemble in a Feature Film for Sponge Out of Water.

Other awards

In 2012 he was nominated at the Critics' Choice Movie Awards for Best Acting Ensemble in the film The Artist. In 2019 Fargerbakke received the Animation Hall of Fame Game-Changers Award for his work as Patrick Star at that year's World Animation & VFX Summit.
