= Kaz (cartoonist) =

American cartoonist and illustrator (born 1959)

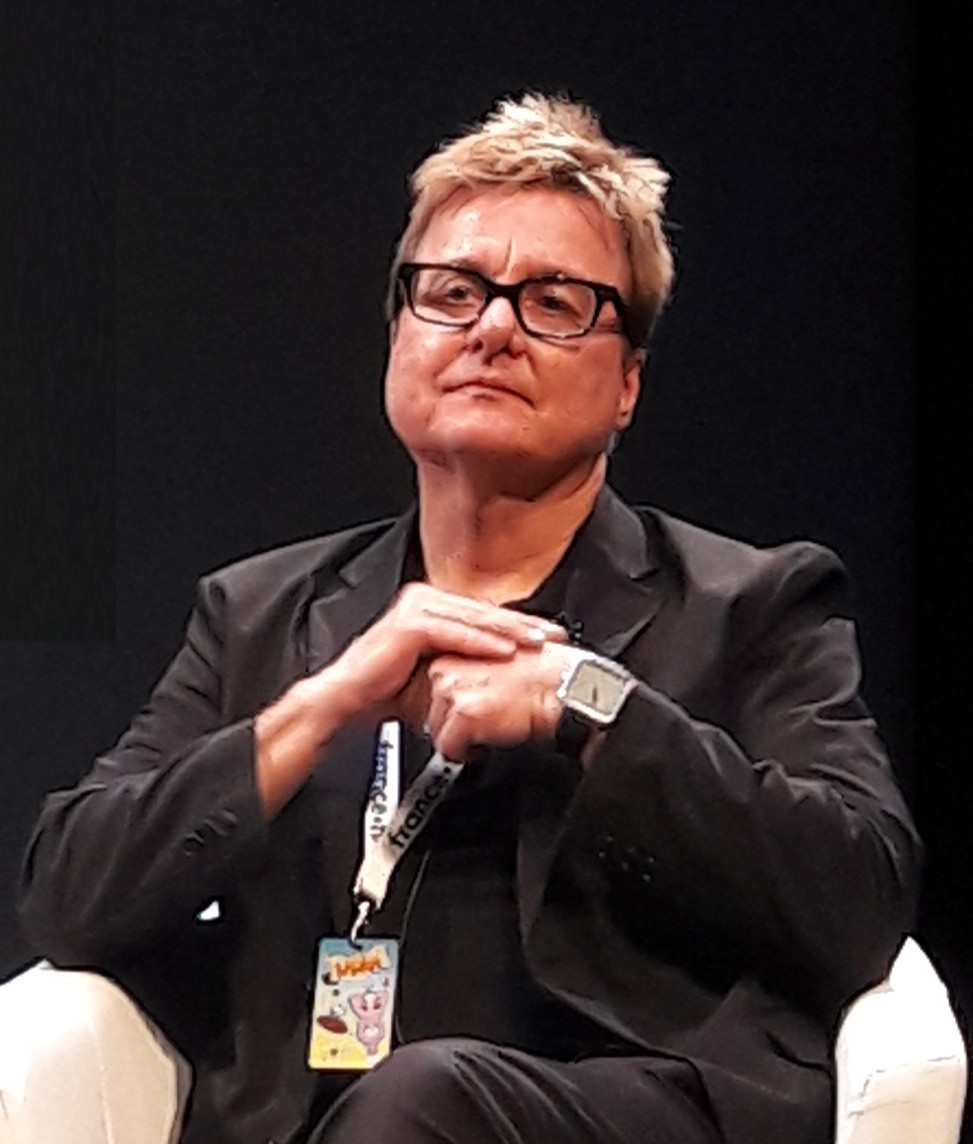
- Kaz at the 2019 Annecy International Animated Film Festival
- Born: Kazimieras Gediminas Prapuolenis; 1959 (age 66–67) Hoboken, New Jersey, U.S.
- Areas: Cartoonist, animator, illustrator, writer, storyboard artist
- Notable works: Underworld; SpongeBob SquarePants; Camp Lazlo; Phineas & Ferb; Kamp Koral: SpongeBob's Under Years; The Patrick Star Show
- Spouse: Linda Marotta

Kazimieras Gediminas Prapuolenis (born 1959), known professionally as Kaz, is an American cartoonist, animator, writer, storyboard artist, and illustrator. In the 1980s, after attending New York City's School of the Visual Arts, he was a frequent contributor to the comic anthologies RAW and Weirdo. Since 1992, he has drawn Underworld, an adult-themed syndicated comic strip that appears in many alternative weeklies. He is also known for his long tenure as a storyboard director and writer for SpongeBob SquarePants and works on shows such as Camp Lazlo and Phineas & Ferb.

== Career ==
Kaz's comics and drawings have appeared in many alternative and mainstream publications including Details, The New Yorker, Nickelodeon Magazine, The Village Voice, East Village Eye, Swank, RAW, Eclipse, N.Y. Rocker, New York Press, Screw, and Bridal Guide. He has continued to contribute to comics anthologies such as Zero Zero.

Kaz has also worked on several animated television shows including SpongeBob SquarePants, Camp Lazlo, and Phineas and Ferb. He was the co-executive producer of Get Blake!.

Kaz joined SpongeBob SquarePants as a storyboard director and writer in 2001 during the production of the series' third season and was paired with Paul Tibbitt and C. H. Greenblatt. The series went on hiatus after production began on The SpongeBob SquarePants Movie. Shortly before production on the fourth season began in 2004, Kaz was invited by his colleague and the series' newly appointed showrunner, Paul Tibbitt, to work on an episode for the fourth season but he was never contacted by Tibbitt again and joined Camp Lazlo after leaving SpongeBob. After Phineas and Ferb ended production, Kaz returned to SpongeBob in 2015 as a writer.

With Derek Drymon, Kaz co-wrote and storyboarded the pilot episode for Diggs Tailwagger, which was ultimately not picked up. In September 2006, Kaz left Camp Lazlo to work on another pilot for a Cartoon Network show, Zoot Rumpus, based on a character from Underworld. With Mr. Lawrence, he wrote the episode SpongeBob's Big Birthday Blowout and worked on the first SpongeBob spinoff, Kamp Koral. He also serves as a writer and story editor on the second spinoff, The Patrick Star Show.

Kaz also co-wrote the screenplay for the Sandy Cheeks spinoff film, Saving Bikini Bottom: The Sandy Cheeks Movie, alongside Tom Stern.

== Personal life ==
Kaz lives in Hollywood, California, with his wife Linda Marotta. Kaz is of Lithuanian descent, his parents having immigrated from Lithuania.

== Filmography ==
=== Television ===
Year	Title	Role
2001–2004, 2015–present	SpongeBob SquarePants	Writer, storyboard director, story outlines, animation writer
2005–08	Camp Lazlo	Writer, storyboard director, story outlines
2006	Zoot Rumpus	Creator, writer, storyboard artist (pilot)
2007	Diggs Tailwagger	Co-writer & storyboard artist (pilot)
2009–2013, 2015	Phineas and Ferb	Writer & storyboard artist
2012	Secret Mountain Fort Awesome	Prop and effects designer ("Funstro")
2015	Get Blake!	Executive producer
2018	Little Big Awesome	Writer (2 episodes)
2021–2024	Kamp Koral: SpongeBob's Under Years	Developer, head writer, writer, animation writer, theme music composer
2021–present	The Patrick Star Show	Creator, developer, head writer, writer, animation writer, story outlines

=== Film ===
Year	Title	Role
2002	God Hates Cartoons	Creator of 2 animated shorts based on Kaz's comic strip Underworld
2004	The SpongeBob SquarePants Movie	Conception character designer
2005	SpongeBob SquarePants 4-D Ride	Writer
2005	Corpse Bride	Additional storyboard artist
2011	Phineas and Ferb the Movie: Across the 2nd Dimension	Additional material, additional storyboards, storyboard artist (as KAZ)
2018	Scooby-Doo! & Batman: The Brave and the Bold	Story by
2019	SpongeBob's Big Birthday Blowout	20th anniversary special, writer
2024	Saving Bikini Bottom: The Sandy Cheeks Movie	Story by, writer
2025	Plankton: The Movie	Writer
2025	The SpongeBob Movie: Search for SquarePants	Story by

== Bibliography ==
Year	Title	Publisher	Notes
1997	Underworld Vol 1: Cruel and Unusual Comics	Fantagraphics	Out of print
1997	Underworld Vol 2: Bare Bulbs	Fantagraphics	Out of print
1997	Sidetrack City and Other Tales	Fantagraphics	Out of print
1999	Underworld Vol 3: Ink Punk	Fantagraphics	Out of print
2002	Underworld Vol 4: Duh!	Fantagraphics	Out of print
2004	Underworld Vol 5: My Little Funny	Fantagraphics	Out of print

Month	Title	Issue	Story	Publisher	Notes
Dec. 2014	SpongeBob Comics	#39	"Grudge with Your Grub"	United Plankton Pictures	Story
Jan. 2015	SpongeBob Comics	#40	"Lavable Pin-Up Comic"	United Plankton Pictures	Story
Oct. 2015	SpongeBob Comics	#49	"Monster Canyon"	United Plankton Pictures	Story
