= Friend or Foe (SpongeBob SquarePants) =

- SpongeBob SquarePants episode
- Title card
- Episode no.: Season 5 Episode 1
- Directed by: Alan Smart (animation and supervising); Tom Yasumi (animation); Casey Alexander (storyboard); Zeus Cervas (storyboard); Mike Mitchell (storyboard)
- Written by: Casey Alexander; Zeus Cervas; Mike Mitchell; Steven Banks; Tim Hill
- Narrated by: Tom Kenny
- Production code: 151-501/151-502
- Original air date: April 13, 2007

Episode chronology
← Previous "The Gift of Gum"	Next → "The Original Fry Cook"
- SpongeBob SquarePants (season 5)

"Friend or Foe" is the first episode of the fifth season of the American animated television series SpongeBob SquarePants, and the 81st episode overall. It was written by Casey Alexander, Zeus Cervas, Mike Mitchell, Steven Banks, and Tim Hill, and the animation was directed by supervising director Alan Smart and Tom Yasumi; Alexander, Cervas and Mitchell also functioned as storyboard directors. The episode originally aired on Nickelodeon in the United States on April 13, 2007.

In the episode, Mr. Krabs reveals to SpongeBob that he and his business rival Plankton were actually best friends during their childhood. Through a series of flashbacks, Mr. Krabs tells the story of how that friendship deteriorated, the cause of their rivalry, why Mr. Krabs is obsessed with money, why Plankton became the villain he is today, and how the Krabby Patty sandwich was created in the process.

The episode received positive reviews upon release, and was released on DVD on April 17, 2007, four days after it aired.

== Plot ==
=== Patchy the Pirate subplot ===
Patchy and Potty are working at a restaurant called "Poop Deck," hoping to becoming just like SpongeBob. After an argument with Potty, Patchy ends their friendship and goes home. He compares himself and Potty to Mr. Krabs and Plankton, starting the SpongeBob plot.

Later, Potty appears to Patchy and tells him that he is now assistant manager because of his "fancy book smarts". When Patchy realizes the food he cooks tastes bad, Potty tells him that he needs to practice his cooking skills. After a montage of training, Patchy makes his first burger, but discovers it tastes terrible and throws it away. Patchy shrugs and says that SpongeBob's first patty probably didn't go so well. However, Potty shows SpongeBob making his first patty perfectly.

After another argument with Potty, Patchy starts throwing patties at him, with one eventually hitting Mr. Pirateson, the Owner of Poop Deck. Patchy then tells the viewers to watch the rest of the SpongeBob episode while he watches Potty get fired, just as Mr. Pirateson forcefully calls Patchy into his office. After the episode is over, both Patchy and Potty are fired. When Patchy finds out that he's been replaced by a gorilla, he calls it a "smelly, hairy fleabag", to which the gorilla fiercely responds by throwing patties at him.

=== Main plot ===
After yet another attack at the Krusty Krab by Plankton, SpongeBob asks Mr. Krabs why they hate each other. Mr. Krabs tells his side of the story in a series of flashbacks. In the flashback, Mr. Krabs and Plankton were best friends from birth, and did everything together. Both were outcasts and ridiculed by a particular circle of bullies, with Plankton being viewed as a nerd for his intelligence and Mr. Krabs being extremely poor. One day, Mr. Krabs finds a penny at the carnival, which he spends on a balloon for Plankton. Later, they get enough money to buy a burger from Stinky's Burgers, which, despite having horrible food and being located in a landfill, is very popular among the local children. When Stinky refuses to serve them equally, saying that "freaks" like them are bad for business, Plankton and Krabs decide to go into the burger business themselves, creating their own burger that no one wants to try. They find out that the local health department closed Stinky's, so the two open "Plabs Burgers" at the dump, which the children are now forced to eat at, despite it being even worse than Stinky's. Plankton states that they should use the burgers to rule over the children, while Mr. Krabs argues that they should care about satisfying the customers rather than power. After an argument, Krabs is ejected into a dump pile, telling Plankton that he will one day regret this.

Back at the Krusty Krab, Plankton disagrees with Mr. Krabs' story and tells SpongeBob his own version. His story is the same as Mr. Krabs', except that their roles during the argument are reversed, with Krabs wanting to control the money of the children and Plankton being launched into the dump pile. Plankton and Krabs begin arguing about the story until Karen arrives and tells the real story: The restaurant initially has no customers, with only Old Man Jenkins trying the burger. After eating it, he collapses, having been poisoned by the patty. Krabs and Plankton accuse each other of tainting the patty. They fight over the recipe, eventually tearing it in two, with Plankton storming out to pursue his own career in food. However, during the struggle, a shelf was knocked down, dumping various ingredients and creating a new patty recipe that Krabs was left with. The two go their separate ways, each trying to open their own establishment. Mr. Krabs' Krabby Patty becomes a success, while Plankton's Chum Burger is horrible, making him to promise to steal the formula and have his revenge. After hearing the story, Plankton and Krabs begin to make amends, until Plankton takes the formula from Krabs' pocket. Then the two start chasing each other as the episode ends.

== Production ==
"Friend or Foe" is a special episode written by Casey Alexander, Zeus Cervas, Mike Mitchell, Steven Banks and Tim Hill, with Alan Smart and Tom Yasumi serving as animation directors. Alexander, Cervas and Mitchell also function as storyboard directors. It originally aired on Nickelodeon in the United States on April 13, 2007, with a TV-Y7 parental rating. On April 2, 2007, Nickelodeon released a preview clip of the episode on TurboNick. Immediately following the episode's on-air premiere, "Friend or Foe" was streamed on TurboNick. On April 5, Nick.com launched an online game themed to the special episode called "Friend or Foe Trash Bash."

Tom Ascheim, executive vice president and general manager for Nickelodeon Television, said "We are always looking for new ways to tell stories and go beyond the traditional platforms of presenting them to our audience[...] "'Friend or Foe?' reveals the great back story of the long-standing feud between Mr. Krabs vs. Plankton and we're offering kids an interactive opportunity to get involved in the story and spirited contest by rooting for one or the other." As part of the special programming event, Nickelodeon held "The Friend or Foe-Down", a convergent contest where two teams of children meet a series of challenges before the episode's premiere. Team Krabs and Team Plankton each consisted of three children led by team captains and hosts Alexandra Gizela and Jordan Carlos. Each team was infiltrated by a "foe" who is secretly working for the other team, as they partake in a series of "funny and messy" physical group challenges refereed by Tom Kenny as Patchy the Pirate. Team Krabs were the winners.

The episode was later released on the DVD of the same name on April 17, 2007. The DVD featured six other episodes, including "The Original Fry Cook", "Night Light", "Rise and Shine", "Waiting", "Fungus Among Us" and "Spy Buddies", and the original uncut animatic for "Friend or Foe" and special Plankton and Mr. Krabs photo gallery as bonus features. It was also released on the SpongeBob SquarePants: Season 5, Vol. 1 DVD on September 4, 2007. On September 22, 2009, "Friend or Foe" was released on the SpongeBob SquarePants: The First 100 Episodes DVD, alongside all the episodes of seasons one through five.

== Marketing ==
In 2007, Nickelodeon partnered with Stride Rite Corporation to co-sponsor the SpongeBob SquarePants Friend or Foe? network event on Nickelodeon on Friday, April 13. Stride Rite utilized Nickelodeon as the exclusive marketing platform for its SuperBall footwear line, in support of the SpongeBob event. Stride Rite vice president Phil Risinger said "SpongeBob SquarePants Friend or Foe? not only gives the stride rite brand exposure during the highest rated kids' television show, but creates awareness for SuperBall with kids during our peak spring season."

Nickelodeon announced a strategic partnership with Kajeet. Advertising and promotional elements of the partnership include sponsorship of a number of Nickelodeon's big television events, starting with this episode. To support the SpongeBob SquarePants Friend or Foe? television event, Kajeet and Nickelodeon launched exclusive mobile content related to the episode. Kajeet was also the exclusive sponsor of "Trash Bash".

== Reception ==
"Friend or Foe" received mostly positive reviews. Paul Mavis of DVD Talk was positive towards the episode specifically on the live action scenes, writing "Patchy and Potty are always funny, so it's great to see them slinging hamburgers in honor of their idol, SpongeBob. I particularly liked the gorilla at the end, whipping burgers at Patchy ('You got me right in the buns!')." Mavis also praised the episode calling it "brilliant" because "[Mr.] Krabs and Plankton are strong enough characters, with their own mythology, that they can sustain their very own episode with only a cameo from SpongeBob." He also said the episode is "[...]hilarious (I love the fact that it's a barely disguised version of Rashomon), with an especially funny look at Krabs, Plankton, and even SpongeBob, as babies."

David Packard of DVD Verdict said that the live action scenes "add to the silliness." He also said "It's a nice change of pace to see Plankton and Krabs as chums pre-Chum Bucket and finding out what led to their friendship's eventual demise. Viewers also get to see Mr. Krabs introduced to 'the love of his life' as he develops the secret formula to the Krabby Patty that Bikini Bottom's residents know and love today." On the DVD, Patrick Cossel of Blogcritics said "Children and adults will laugh out loud at the crazy slapstick antics of the one who lives under the sea." He added that "This release is sure to be huge hit for SpongeBob fans everywhere." Lesley Aeschliman of Yahoo! Voices was negative on the episode saying "'Friend of Foe?' just felt like a regular episode that really had no reason to be hyped a special."
