= List of SpongeBob SquarePants characters =

The main characters of the series. Top row, from left to right: Pearl, Plankton, and Karen. Bottom row: Sandy, Mr. Krabs, SpongeBob, Squidward, Gary, Patrick, and Mrs. Puff.

The characters in the American animated television series SpongeBob SquarePants were created by artist, animator, and former marine biologist Stephen Hillenburg. The series chronicles the adventures of the character SpongeBob SquarePants and his various friends in the fictional underwater city of Bikini Bottom. Most characters are anthropomorphic sea creatures based on real-life species. Many of the characters' designs originated in an educational comic book titled The Intertidal Zone, which Hillenburg created in the 1980s.

SpongeBob SquarePants features the voices of Tom Kenny, Bill Fagerbakke, Rodger Bumpass, Clancy Brown, Mr. Lawrence, Jill Talley, Carolyn Lawrence, Mary Jo Catlett and Lori Alan. Most of the secondary, one-off and background characters are voiced by Dee Bradley Baker, Sirena Irwin, Bob Joles, Mark Fite and Thomas F. Wilson. In addition to the series' regular cast, various celebrities from a wide range of professions have voiced guest characters and recurring roles.

The show's characters have received positive critical reception and attention from celebrities. They have made frequent appearances in media outside of the television show, including a theatrical film series, many video games, and two spin-off series. The characters have also been referenced and parodied throughout popular culture. The character SpongeBob became a merchandising icon during the height of the show's second season and has seen continued commercial popularity.

== Creation and conception ==
Stephen Hillenburg originally conceived early versions of the SpongeBob SquarePants characters in 1984, while he was teaching and studying marine biology at what is now the Orange County Marine Institute in Dana Point, California. During this period, Hillenburg became fascinated with animation, and wrote a comic book titled The Intertidal Zone starring various anthropomorphic forms of sea creatures, many of which would evolve into SpongeBob SquarePants characters, including "Bob the Sponge", who was the co-host of the comic and resembled an actual sea sponge as opposed to SpongeBob. In 1987, Hillenburg left the institute to pursue his dream of becoming an animator.

An early drawing of the initial main characters from Hillenburg's series bible

Patrick, Mr. Krabs, Pearl, and Squidward were the first other characters Hillenburg created for the show. Many of their characteristics were based on Hillenburg's experiences during his time at the Ocean Institute or inspired by the traits of their species. Patrick's personality embodies the nature of the starfish; according to Hillenburg, they look "dumb and slow" but are "very active and aggressive" in reality, like Patrick. Hillenburg drew inspiration from his former manager at a seafood restaurant while creating Mr. Krabs. According to him, this manager was redheaded, muscular, and a former army cook; these traits were all adapted into Krabs' character. His decision to design Pearl was influenced by his regular supervision of whale watches at the Ocean Institute, as well as by a cetacean skeleton at the institute. He drew Pearl with an oversized, almost geometric head as a reference to sperm whales having the largest brain size of any extant animal on Earth. He designed Squidward as an octopus because of the species' bulbous mantle; the octopus, he said, has "such a large bulbous head and Squidward thinks he's an intellectual, so of course he's gonna have [one]". Hillenburg drew Squidward with six tentacles because "it was really just simpler for animation to draw him with six legs instead of eight".

Several additions were made to the series' main cast before and after Hillenburg pitched the series to Nickelodeon; in his series bible, he added Sandy Cheeks, a squirrel clad in a diving suit, as a new friend of SpongeBob. Plankton and Karen were included in his bible but were not meant to make regular appearances; Plankton's voice actor Mr. Lawrence said that he "was only supposed to be in one or two episodes, but I was a writer on the show and I really liked this character". Following his first voice recording, Lawrence drafted some of his own ideas, hoping to "prove Plankton could survive as more than a one-note character". From then on, Plankton and Karen's roles in the series grew as Lawrence wrote ideas to give them more personality; notably, he decided to write Karen as Plankton's wife, rather than just his computer as was originally intended. They were both officially promoted to main cast members in the credits of the 2004 theatrical film, in which they play central roles.

Hillenburg added Mrs. Puff in response to a request by Nickelodeon that SpongeBob attend school. Initially, Nickelodeon executives felt that children would not relate to SpongeBob because he was an adult. They told Hillenburg to make SpongeBob more childlike by making him attend school, with a schoolteacher as his authority figure. Hillenburg compromised by creating Mrs. Puff as SpongeBob's boat-driving teacher. This satisfied Nickelodeon's request while allowing SpongeBob to remain an adult character. According to Nickelodeon's SpongeBob BingePants podcast, Mrs. Puff's addition "saved the show" and caused Nickelodeon to agree to produce the series.

Beginning with the eleventh season, the series' writers began an effort to give more storylines to the four main female characters (Karen, Sandy, Mrs. Puff, and Pearl). This led to the creation of the "Gal Pals," a friend group between the female characters, first introduced in the episode "Girls' Night Out." In an interview with People, Lori Alan explained, "Little by little, we've really been able to have more female plotlines." Jill Talley added, "It's nice too for all the little girls out there to see representation on the show."

== Main characters ==
=== SpongeBob SquarePants ===
SpongeBob SquarePants (voiced by Tom Kenny) is an anthropomorphic and energetic yellow sea sponge who usually wears brown short pants, a white collared shirt, and a red tie. Like real sea sponges, he can filter-feed and reproduce by budding. He lives in a pineapple house and is employed as a fry cook at a fast food restaurant called the Krusty Krab. He diligently attends Mrs. Puff's Boating School but has never passed the test; throughout the series, he tries his hardest on the exams, but remains an unintentionally reckless boat driver and often causes accidents. He is relentlessly optimistic and enthusiastic toward his job and his friends. SpongeBob's hobbies include catching jellyfish, blowing bubbles, playing with his best friend Patrick, and unintentionally irritating his bad-tempered neighbor Squidward. He first appears in "Help Wanted".

=== Patrick Star ===
Patrick Star (voiced by Bill Fagerbakke) is a pink starfish who lives under a rock and wears green and purple flowered swim trunks. His most prominent character trait is his extremely low intelligence. He is best friends with SpongeBob and often unknowingly encourages activities that could get the two into lots of trouble. While typically unemployed throughout the series, Patrick holds various short-term jobs as the storyline of each episode requires, particularly with various stints at the Krusty Krab. He is generally slow and even-tempered, but can sometimes get very aggressive, much like real starfish, and occasionally performs feats of great strength.

=== Squidward Tentacles ===
Squidward Tentacles (voiced by Rodger Bumpass) is a turquoise bad-tempered Giant Pacific octopus with a large nose who works as a cashier at the Krusty Krab, but despises his job and desires a much better life. He is SpongeBob's next-door neighbor with a dry, sarcastic sense of humor. His house is between SpongeBob's and Patrick's houses. He believes himself to be a talented artist and musician, but nobody else recognizes his abilities. He plays the clarinet and often paints self-portraits in different styles, which he hangs up around his moai house. Squidward frequently voices his great frustration with SpongeBob, but he genuinely cares for him deep down and will occasionally stick up for him. This has been revealed in the form of sudden confessions when Squidward is in a dire situation or when SpongeBob is severely treated unfairly.

=== Mr. Krabs ===
Eugene Krabs (voiced by Clancy Brown) is a red crab who lives in an anchor-shaped house with his daughter Pearl, who is a whale. He dislikes spending money but will go to great lengths to make Pearl very happy. Mr. Krabs owns and operates the Krusty Krab restaurant where SpongeBob and Squidward work. He is self-content, cunning, and very obsessed with the value and essence of money. He tends to worry much more about his riches than about the needs of his employees. Having served in the navy, he speaks like a stereotypical pirate and loves sailing, whales and sea shanties.

=== Plankton and Karen ===
Sheldon Plankton (voiced by Mr. Lawrence) and Karen Plankton (voiced by Jill Talley) are the owners of the Chum Bucket, an unsuccessful restaurant located across the street from the Krusty Krab. Their business is a commercial failure because they sell mostly inedible foods made from chum. Plankton is a small dark green planktonic copepod and the self-proclaimed archenemy of Mr. Krabs. His ultimate goal is to steal Krabs' secret formula for Krabby Patties, run the Krusty Krab out of business, and take over the world, but he never permanently succeeds, usually due to either SpongeBob and/or Krabs' efforts, his own incompetence and immaturity, or his own small size (except, temporarily, in The SpongeBob SquarePants Movie). Plankton is a skilled inventor and possesses a Napoleon complex due to his short stature. Karen is Plankton's own invention, a waterproof supercomputer who is more competent than Plankton, being the brains behind most of his evil plans to steal Krabs' secret recipe. She is married to Plankton and usually takes residence in the Chum Bucket laboratory. Karen speaks with a pronounced Midwestern American accent.

=== Sandy Cheeks ===
Sandy Cheeks (voiced by Carolyn Lawrence) is a brown squirrel from Texas who lives in an air-filled glass dome and wears a diving suit to be able to breathe underwater. When aquatic creatures enter her home, they wear helmets of water to survive. Sandy speaks with a Southern drawl and often uses Texas slang. Her hobbies include extreme sports, science experiments, and karate. Sandy is also a member of the Gal Pals, a friend group with Karen, Mrs. Puff, and Pearl.

=== Mrs. Puff ===
Mrs. Puff (voiced by Mary Jo Catlett) is a paranoid pufferfish who is SpongeBob's teacher at boating school, an underwater driver's education facility where students drive boats like cars. She wears a sailor suit and her school is a lighthouse. SpongeBob is Mrs. Puff's most dedicated student and knows the answer to every question on her written and oral exams, but always panics and crashes when he actually tries to drive. She puffs up into a ball when she is scared or injured. As a running gag, she is frequently arrested by the police, usually due to her being responsible for SpongeBob when he unintentionally causes destruction around Bikini Bottom during his boating tests.

=== Pearl Krabs ===
Pearl Krabs (voiced by Lori Alan) is a teenage sperm whale and Mr. Krabs' daughter. She wants to fit in with her fish peers, but finds this impossible to do because of the large size inherent to her species. She will inherit the Krusty Krab from her father when she grows older, but is still in high school and does not yet have a job at the family business. Pearl's favorite activities are working at the Bikini Bottom Mall, using her father's credit card to buy anything that is in style, and listening to pop music.

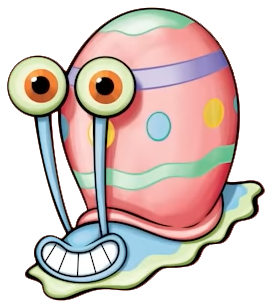
Gary the Snail.

=== Gary the Snail ===
Gary the Snail (vocal effects provided by Tom Kenny) is SpongeBob's pet sea snail who lives with him in their pineapple home and vocalizes like a cat. Other snails and SpongeBob can understand and talk to him. Depicted as a level-headed, wise, and sophisticated character, Gary often serves as a voice of reason and a foil to SpongeBob and helps solve problems that his owner cannot solve by himself. He has a pink shell that is impossibly spacious on the inside.

== Supporting characters ==
=== Patchy the Pirate ===
Patchy the Pirate as he appears in Big Time Rush episode "Big Time Beach Party" (2011)

Patchy the Pirate (portrayed by Tom Kenny in live-action and voiced by him in animated form) is the host of the series' special episodes. He is a live-action pirate and the president of the fictional SpongeBob fan club. He lives in an unnamed suburb of Encino, Los Angeles, California, and segments hosted by him are often presented in a dual narrative with the animated stories.

Patchy has interacted with SpongeBob in "SpongeBob's Big Birthday Blowout" where he sent his head to SpongeBob as a gift.

In "SpongeBob's Road to Christmas", Patchy was seen in animated form when SpongeBob, Patrick, and Plankton stumbled upon his Christmas theme park side hustle that had him operating as Santa Claus. He does provide them with a map to the North Pole.

Patchy made a special guest star appearance on Big Time Rush in the episode "Big Time Beach Party", where he interacted with Carlos Pena Jr. and Logan Henderson.

==== Potty the Parrot ====
Potty the Parrot (voiced by Stephen Hillenburg in seasons 2–3, Paul Tibbitt from seasons 5–8, Mr. Lawrence from seasons 10–present) is Patchy's green pet parrot, depicted as a crudely made puppet with googly eyes. The character's name is a reference to "Polly wants a cracker," a phrase often used for parrots to vocally mimic. Potty is quite obnoxious and often annoys or talks back to Patchy while he is trying to host an episode.

=== French Narrator ===
The French Narrator (voiced by Tom Kenny, portrayed by Dan Southworth and Vincent Waller in live-action appearances) is an oceanographer who films SpongeBob's world using a camera. He often introduces episodes from off-screen or narrates the intertitles as if the series were a nature documentary about the ocean. He has a thick French accent as a reference to the distinctive speaking style of oceanographer and filmmaker Jacques Cousteau. He is normally only heard, but physically appears three times. In "No Free Rides", after being accidentally hit by SpongeBob during a driving test, his legs, which are wearing scuba diving fins, are visible.

In "Feral Friends" and "SpongeBob's Big Birthday Blowout", he is shown in live action as a hard hat diver with his face obscured by his helmet and a red beanie hat on top, referencing the beanie hat Cousteau was widely known for wearing. In "Mimic Madness", SpongeBob impersonates him by imitating his voice and wearing a beanie and beard, once again referencing Cousteau.

=== Mermaid Man and Barnacle Boy ===
Mermaid Man (voiced by Ernest Borgnine as an old man and a young man in "The Bad Guy Club for Villains", Adam West as a young man in "Back to the Past") and his sidekick Barnacle Boy (voiced by Tim Conway as an old man and a young man in "The Bad Guy Club for Villains", Burt Ward as a young man in "Back to the Past") are two elderly, semi-retired superheroes who live in Shady Shoals, a retirement home, and are stars of SpongeBob and Patrick's favorite television show. Mermaid Man is a stereotypically senile senior citizen who dramatically yells "Evil!" whenever he hears the word, while Barnacle Boy is shown to be the smarter, more sensible, and more irritable of the two. Besides being able to breathe underwater and talk to sea creatures, both men can throw water balls and telepathically summon sea creatures to help them fight against crime. "Mermaid Man Begins" confirms that their given first names are Ernie and Tim, referencing the first names of their respective voice actors. Aquaman artist Ramona Fradon drew the characters' comic book adventures. A series of SpongeBob SquarePants official collectors' trading cards published by Topps gives their last names as Huckler and Strangler.

Since Borgnine and Conway's deaths in 2012 and 2019, respectively, both characters have been limited to cameo appearances without dialogue, as the showrunners chose not to recast their voices.

=== The Flying Dutchman ===
The Flying Dutchman (voiced by Brian Doyle-Murray in the TV series, Mark Hamill in The SpongeBob Movie: Search for SquarePants) is an irritable, mischievous pirate ghost who glows green. He is named after the ghost ship of the same name. He haunts the seven seas because his unburied corpse was used as a window display. He collects souls as a Satan-like character and resides in a cavern containing Davy Jones' Locker, a literal locker stuffed with very smelly socks that belong to Monkees singer Davy Jones, which within the series is analogous to Hell and occasionally mentioned as a curse word.

=== King Neptune ===
King Neptune (voiced by John O'Hurley in the TV series, Paul Tibbitt in "SpongeBob vs. The Patty Gadget") is a very powerful, trident-wielding merman god who rules the sea, based on the Roman mythological deity of the same name. In the series, Neptune lives in a palace in Atlantis with his wife Amphitrite and son Triton. He is usually portrayed as very arrogant and selfish, showing little sympathy for the sea's fish populace. Neptune has a mostly teal color scheme with a long auburn beard and hair. He wears gold wrist bands and a matching crown decorated with a scallop ornament, plus a gold belt bearing a seahorse emblem. This version was also known as Neptune XIV as seen when his portrait is shown in Squidward's briefly redecorated room as seen in "Krusty Towers".

A different King Neptune is featured in The SpongeBob SquarePants Movie, voiced by Jeffrey Tambor. In the film, he resides near Bikini Bottom with his daughter Mindy and resembles a light green-skinned king with a robe, a shorter beard and hair, a domed crown to cover his bald spot, and powers limited to what can be exercised through his trident.

In The Patrick Star Show episode "Neptune's Ball", the King Neptune seen in the main series holds the titular ball that the Star family thought they were invited to when Patrick got a hold of Lady Upturn's invitation to it. When King Neptune arrives after the Star family was caught by the guards trespassing, King Neptune recognizes Patrick and has them released since he is a big fan of Patrick's show. Through Patrick's suggestion, King Neptune moves the party to the Star family's house.

=== Larry the Lobster ===
Larry the Lobster (usually voiced by Mr. Lawrence but voiced by Bill Fagerbakke for a line in "MuscleBob BuffPants" and "House Hunting") is a strong lobster lifeguard and bodybuilder who thoroughly enjoys exercising, especially if it involves lifting heavy weights. He is usually seen at Goo Lagoon alongside Scooter. He first appears in "Ripped Pants" and reappears in the spinoff Kamp Koral: SpongeBob's Under Years.

=== Harold and Margaret SquarePants ===
Mr. Harold SquarePants (voiced by Tom Kenny) and Mrs. Margaret SquarePants (voiced by Sirena Irwin) are SpongeBob's parents, who more closely resemble round sea sponges than SpongeBob. Harold is dark brown with glasses and a moustache, while Margaret is dark orange. They seem to live outside of Bikini Bottom, but still take the time to visit their son on occasion. They are proud of SpongeBob, but embarrassed that he still does not have a driver's license.

=== Realistic Fish Head ===
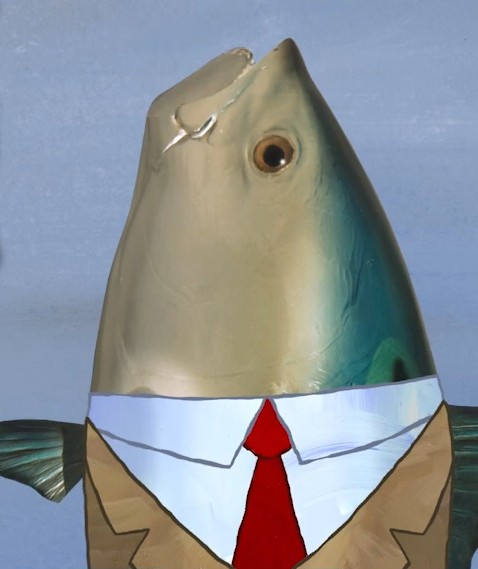
Realistic Fish Head, as seen in the trailer of SpongeBob SquarePants: The Cosmic Shake

The Realistic Fish head (voiced by Mr. Lawrence) is an announcer and news anchor fish, resembling a cut-out of a live-action tuna. He also appears in the series' title sequence, lip-syncing part of the song. He has been given various different names throughout the series and tie-in media; it is Mister Fish in SpongeBob's Nicktoon Summer Splash, Elaine in "The Great Patty Caper", Johnny in Battle for Bikini Bottom and Battle for Bikini Bottom – Rehydrated, and "T. McTrout" in Toonz2Nite commercials for Nicktoons UK.

=== Perch Perkins ===
Perch Perkins (voiced by Dee Bradley Baker) is a perch who works as a famous field news reporter. While the Realistic Fish Head only reports on television news programs, Perch makes physical appearances reporting about events that occur. He is normally purple with a dark purple coat with a black wig and headphones, although some episodes and Nicktoons MLB show him with an orange color scheme and a red coat.

=== Bubble Bass ===
Bubble Bass (voiced by Dee Bradley Baker) is an overweight green bass fish that first appeared in season 1. He is a nemesis of SpongeBob and is very picky about his food. Although initially dormant after season 1, he began to appear far more frequently as a supporting character in season 8, and he has even had a notable share of episodes focused on him in both protagonist and antagonist roles in the series, such as "Swamp Mates".

=== Nosferatu ===
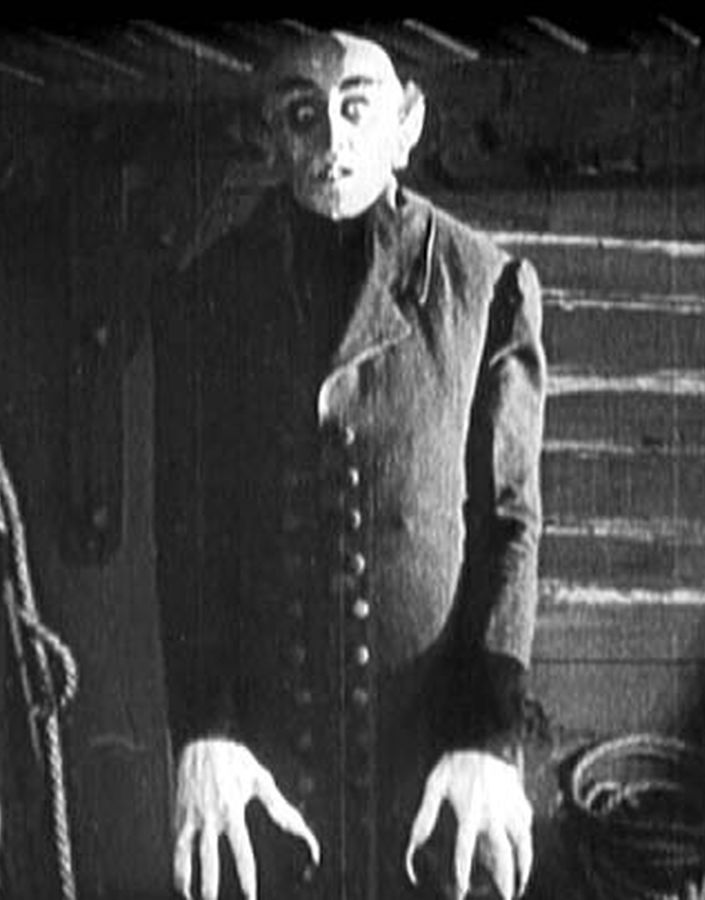
Nosferatu's appearance is derived from depictions of Count Orlok in the 1922 film Nosferatu.

Nosferatu is a non-speaking vampire from Transylvania, animated by static photo cutouts of Max Schreck's portrayal of the character from the 1922 silent film. He was originally planned to be a one-time guest who makes a cameo at the ending of "Graveyard Shift" for a quick gag, repeatedly switching the lights on and off inside the Krusty Krab late at night as a prank to scare SpongeBob and Squidward. However, he became a minor recurring character from Season 11 onwards. He is shown to work as a late night shift manager for the Krusty Krab.

In Kamp Koral: SpongeBob's Under Years, there is a younger version of Nosferatu called Kidferatu

=== Slappy Laszlo ===
Slappy Laszlo (voiced by Tom Kenny impersonating Peter Lorre) is a fish whose voice, appearance, and mannerisms are modeled after Peter Lorre. After appearing in "SpongeBob's Big Birthday Blowout", Slappy was shown to work as a butler for Nosferatu in "Squidferatu", "Slappy Daze", and "FunBelievable". Slappy also recurred on The Patrick Star Show as a big fan of the titular show.

=== Old Man Jenkins ===
Old Man Jenkins (voiced by various actors from seasons 5—10, John Gegenhuber since season 11) is an elderly townsperson who lives at the Shady Shoals retirement home and is a common patron of the Krusty Krab. His appearance and job changed often throughout the first ten seasons. A country style banjo music usually plays whenever he appears. This music was confirmed as a theme song in the episode 'Friend or Foe' when elementary age Eugene Krabs states, "I'd know that theme song anywhere, it's Old Man Jenkins!"

In season 11, the series' staff decided on a finite design for Old Man Jenkins, and the actor John Gegenhuber began to consistently voice him. In the stage musical, Old Man Jenkins stirs up hysteria by blaming the impending volcanic eruption on Sandy.

=== Lady Upturn ===
Lady Mildred Upturn CCCXXXIII (voiced by Sirena Irwin in most appearances, Lori Alan in "Moving Bubble Bass") is a posh rich fish who owns Upturn's Department Store and an art museum. She originally had a blonde fin in earlier appearances before they were recolored to purple.

In Kamp Koral: SpongeBob's Under Years, Upturn is a camper at Yacht Cabin.

Lady Upturn also recurred in The Patrick Star Show.

=== Jellyfish ===
The jellyfish (vocal effects provided by Tom Kenny) are wild animals who reside in Jellyfish Fields, a meadow in Bikini Bottom, and have a very strong affinity for music. Within the series, jellyfish behave like sentient insects, squirt jelly, buzz and swarm like bees, and can sting their enemies with electric shocks that leave very painful welts.

=== Incidentals ===
The incidentals are a large variety of characters who function as the main background characters of the show. They are all each referred as "Incidental" followed by their given model number. Their names, jobs, personalities, relationships, ages, and sometimes gender are inconsistent and tend to differ from each episode. There are an estimated over 300 incidental characters. These characters can usually be portrayed as customers at the Krusty Krab, beachgoers at Goo Lagoon, police officers, paramedics, or characters making up a large crowd or audience, although they also commonly make supporting and/or speaking roles. Various voice actors have voiced the incidentals throughout the franchise: Charlie Adler, Lori Alan, Dee Bradley Baker, Susan Boyajian, Clancy Brown, Rodger Bumpass, Mary Jo Catlett, Bill Fagerbakke, Mark Fite, John Gegenhuber, Kate Higgins, Sirena Irwin, Tom Kenny, Carolyn Lawrence, Mr. Lawrence, Kent Osborne, Sara Paxton, Kevin Michael Richardson, Dana Snyder, Cree Summer, Jill Talley, James Arnold Taylor, Paul Tibbitt, and Thomas F. Wilson.

While the majority of them do not have consistently used names, there are a few that do have consistent names:

- Fred/Incidental 1 (voiced by Mr. Lawrence in most appearances, Carlos Alazraqui, Clancy Brown, Rodger Bumpass, David Dobrik, Bill Fagerbakke, Mark Fite, Tom Kenny, Jill Talley, Paul Tibbitt, and Thomas F. Wilson at other points) is a brown grouper who is one of the most commonly used incidentals. He is usually known for yelling "My leg!" during disastrous situations. He even has an episode that revolves around him that is known as "My Leg!"
- Tom/Incidental 6 (voiced at different points by Dee Bradley Baker, Mr. Lawrence, Carlos Alazraqui, Susan Boyajian, Clancy Brown, Rodger Bumpass, Bill Fagerbakke, Tom Kenny, and Thomas F. Wilson) is a brown trout and "inbetween"-type incidental that makes many background and supporting appearances. He is also known for his role in the episode "Chocolate with Nuts" where he angrily screams "Chocolate!" throughout nearly the entire episode.
- Suzy/Incidental 7 (voiced by Sirena Irwin in most appearances, Lori Alan, Dee Bradley Baker, Susan Boyajian, Mary Jo Catlett, Kate Higgins, Carolyn Lawrence, Cree Summer, Jill Talley at other points) is a gray minnow and "hotdog"-type incidentlal who makes several background and supporting appearances. She is also sometimes portrayed as a friend of Pearl in a few episodes.
- Don the Whale/Incidental 32 (voiced at different points by Dee Bradley Baker, Clancy Brown, and Tom Kenny) is a strong and muscular orca whale who makes slightly uncommon appearances throughout the series. He is usually portrayed to be a bodybuilder at Goo Lagoon and can usually be seen among other strong and muscular characters such as Larry the Lobster.
- Morty/Incidental 37B (voiced by Dee Bradley Baker in most appearances, Clancy Brown, Rodger Bumpass, Bill Fagerbakke, Mark Fite, Sirena Irwin, Tom Kenny, Mr. Lawrence, Kevin Michael Richardson, Jill Talley, and Thomas F. Wilson at other points) is a purple fish with a green cap that makes many background and supporting appearances. He has also occasionally been portrayed as a young paperboy that is known as the "newsie" and is a "hotdog"-type incidental.
- Scooter/Incidental 38 (voiced by Carlos Alazraqui in most appearances, Dee Bradley Baker, Clancy Brown, Rodger Bumpass, Bill Fagerbakke, Mark Fite, Tom Kenny, Mr. Lawrence, Dana Snyder, and Thomas F. Wilson at other points) is a lavender fish that makes semi-common background and supporting appearances. He can usually be seen at Goo Lagoon as a beachgoer and is also well known for his high pitched shaky voice as well as commonly speaking in a surfer lingo.
- Lou/Incidental 39 (voiced at different points by Dee Bradley Baker and Mr. Lawrence) is an orange fish that is usually portrayed as a vendor and other occupations throughout the series like working as a vendor, a cashier at Barg-N Mart, a diner chef in "Missing Identity", a whoopee cushion truck driver in "Funny Pants", a torch salesman in "Sing a Song of Patrick", a baker in "Mooncation", or a sailor for Captain Scarfish's crew in "Pull Up a Barrel". He tends to make more supporting roles over background roles.
- Harold/Incidental 40 (voiced at different points by Clancy Brown, Mark Fite, Tom Kenny, and Mr. Lawrence) is a cyan dogfish and "hotdog"-type incidental sporting a white T-shirt and red shorts who is one of the most commonly used incidentals. He is known for having an aggressive personality throughout the series.
- Judy/Incidental 45 (voiced by Sirena Irwin in most appearances, Lori Alan, Dee Bradley Baker, Mary Jo Catlett, Carolyn Lawrence, Cree Summer, and Jill Talley at other points) is a pink fish that makes many background and supporting appearances. She has also been portrayed as a teenager in some of her appearances, as well as being a friend of Pearl.
- Old Man Jenkins/Incidental 80 (voiced at different points by Mr. Lawrence, Tom Kenny, and Dee Bradley Baker) is an elderly gray fish that regularly sits in a hospital bed. He is not a too commonly used incidental, but is known for his role in "The Sponge Who Could Fly" as the farmer/sailor/stuntman who constantly claims his dislike towards SpongeBob's "flying machines" throughout the episode.
- Old Man Walker/Incidental 83 (voiced by Tom Kenny in most appearances, Carlos Alazraqui, Dee Bradley Baker, Rodger Bumpass, Mark Fite, Mr. Lawrence, and Dana Snyder at other points) is a green elderly fish that makes many background and supporting appearances throughout the series. He can commonly be used as a side gag where he is used as an inanimate object by other characters or when they tend to easily take advantage of him. He had an episode that revolves around him that is known as "We Heart Hoops."
- Old Man Jenkins/Incidental 86 (voiced by Mr. Lawrence in most appearances, Rodger Bumpass in "Idiot Box") is a yellow elderly fish that makes uncommon appearances throughout the series. He is usually found sitting in a wheelchair.
- Mary/Incidental 87 (voiced at different points by Susan Boyajian, Sirena Irwin, and Jill Talley) is an elderly lady fish that makes somewhat common appearances throughout the series. She is known for having an ancient mother named "Baby Prunes" that can be seen aside her in a few episodes.
- Steve/Incidental 107 (voiced at different points by Dee Bradley Baker, Clancy Brown, Tom Kenny, Bill Fagerbakke, Rodger Bumpass, and John Gegenhuber) is an olive green salmonidae that is one of the most commonly used incidental characters in the show. He has had many different identities and occupations throughout the series like most incidentals do. While he wasn’t necessarily as commonly used in the first four seasons, in season 5 and onwards, he tends to make a speaking or supporting role in nearly every episode he appears in. The "Blackened Sponge" episode featured a female version of Steve (voiced by Sirena Irwin).
- Officer Nancy/Incidental 118B (voiced by Sirena Irwin in most appearances, Jill Talley, Lori Alan, and Carolyn Lawrence at other points) is a lavender police officer fish who makes uncommon appearances throughout the series. She usually makes supporting roles and hardly almost ever makes background roles.
- Mr. Mailman/Incidental 154 (voiced at different points by Dee Bradley Baker, Rodger Bumpass, and Tom Kenny) is a tan fish that is regularly portrayed to be a mail man. He usually makes more supporting roles over background roles. He also commonly appears to have an annoyance towards SpongeBob in many episodes, much like Squidward.
- Sandals/Incidental 156 (voiced by Dee Bradley Baker in most appearances) is an olive fish that makes many background and supporting roles throughout the series. In many of his appearances, he is usually portrayed to be a somewhat meek and easy going character. He is regularly voiced by Dee Bradley Baker, but has had other voice actors as well.
- Helen the Felon/Incidental 173 (voiced at different points by Sirena Irwin, Carolyn Lawrence, Jill Talley, and Tom Kenny) is a young pink girl fish that makes somewhat uncommon appearances throughout the series, although she is one of the more newer incidentals that was introduced in season 11. She is portrayed to be a notorious criminal that takes the appearance of an innocent little girl. In the episode "Delivery of Doom," she is revealed to be a supervillain that is part of the latest incarnation of E.V.I.L.

== Other characters ==
=== Recurring and guest characters ===
- Beatrice (voiced by Betty White) is the owner of Grandma's Apron, the store where Pearl goes to work in "Mall Girl Pearl". An older woman, Beatrice convinces Pearl not to let her teenage friends make fun of her job.
- Bob Barnacle (voiced by Bob Barker) is the director of an animal rescue center where snails escaped from to find SpongeBob in "Sanctuary!" He delivers the "have your pets spayed and neutered" line Barker used to close his game show The Price Is Right.
- Bubble Buddy (voiced by Brad Abrell) is a humanoid bubble created by SpongeBob in "Bubble Buddy". His apparent inanimateness annoys other people of Bikini Bottom, but he is later revealed to be a sentient being before moving out of the town in a taxi-shaped bubble. He later returns in the season 8 episode "Bubble Buddy Returns", having been found to live in Bubbletown, a city made completely out of bubbles.
- Cuddle E. Hugs (voiced by Jeff Garlin) is a giant, bowtie-wearing hamster from the eponymous episode who can only be seen whenever someone ingests a rotten Krabby Patty.

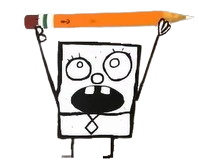
DoodleBob holding a pencil

- DoodleBob (voiced by Paul Tibbitt) is a drawing created by SpongeBob in his image using a human pencil, which is seemingly able to animate anything it draws. He speaks through unintelligible phrases. He appears in "Frankendoodle". He returned later in "Doodle Dimension", torturing SpongeBob and Patrick in a doodling dimension. He also featured as the main villain to defeat in the Drawn to Life: SpongeBob SquarePants Edition video game. In "Captain Pipsqueak", DoodleBob made a cameo among the villains auditioning to join E.V.I.L.
- Flats the Flounder (voiced by Thomas F. Wilson) is a green flounder who had several silent cameos in various season 1 episodes before appearing as the new student at Mrs. Puff's Boating School in "The Bully". He wants to kick SpongeBob's "butt" for no apparent reason and SpongeBob takes it as if Flats wants to murder him. He also appears during the credits of The SpongeBob Movie: Sponge Out of Water
- Gordon (voiced by Ian McShane) is the leader of a band of Vikings who kidnap SpongeBob and Squidward in "Dear Vikings". Except for himself, all of his crewmen are named "Olaf". In "Captain Pipsqueak", Gordon made a cameo among the villains auditioning to join E.V.I.L.
- Granny (voiced by Amy Poehler) is an elderly fish who appears in "Have You Seen This Snail?". She finds snails and force-feeds them so that she can eat them and lock their shells in a closet. She adopts Gary, who was lost in an alley, as her latest victim, but he manages to escape.
- The Ice Cream Man (voiced by Tom Kenny in most appearances, Dee Bradley Baker in The SpongeBob SquarePants Movie, Mr. Lawrence in "My Friend Patty") is a bartender in a peanut mask who works in Goofy Goober's Ice Cream Boat. In The Patrick Star Show, the Ice Cream Man is shown to operate an ice cream boat trick that Patrick often targets.
- Jack Kahuna Laguna (voiced by Johnny Depp) is a legendary human-like surfer who appears in "SpongeBob SquarePants vs. The Big One". He teaches SpongeBob and his friends how to surf so they can go back home and fend off from a legendary tidal wave known as the Big One.
- Jim (voiced by Patton Oswalt) is the Krusty Krab's original fry cook, as revealed in "The Original Fry Cook". His cooking is legendary throughout Bikini Bottom, and he is shown to be an even better chef than SpongeBob. Jim left the Krusty Krab after Mr. Krabs declined to provide him with a higher salary.
- Kenny the Cat (voiced by Biz Markie) is a gray tomcat from the eponymous episode who claims he can hold his breath underwater. He is idolized by SpongeBob until it is realized that Kenny requires an oxygen tank to breathe. After the ruse was exposed by Sandy, SpongeBob got him to continue his goals by putting him in one of Sandy's diving suits.
- Lord Royal Highness (voiced by David Bowie), also referred to as LRH, is the king of Atlantis in "SpongeBob's Atlantis SquarePantis". He invites SpongeBob and his friends for a visit to Atlantis after they find the lost piece of the coin, but eventually regrets it since they (especially Patrick) end up popping the longest living bubble accidentally with a camera flash.
- Madame Hagfish (voiced by Kristen Wiig in "The Curse of the Hex", Jill Talley in "Terror at 20,000 Leagues" and "Captain Pipsqueak") is a fish and an expert witch. In "Captain Pipsqueak", Madame Hagfish is among the villains auditioning to join E.V.I.L. In The Patrick Star Show episode "Terror at 20,000 Leagues", Madame Hagfish runs a Were-Hair Botique that tends to the underwater versions of werewolves.
- Master Udon (voiced by Pat Morita) is an old karate master who appears in "Karate Island." He is actually a scammer who wants people to invest in his condominium project, disguising it as the "King of Karate" crowning that he presents to SpongeBob.
- Queen Amphitrite (voiced by Victoria Beckham) is King Neptune's wife and Triton's mother. She is worried by her son's attitude of not wanting to inherit the throne.
- Prince Triton (voiced by Sebastian Bach) is the teenage son of King Neptune who appears in "The Clash of Triton". He initially wants to be a normal fish like everyone else, but his father convinces him otherwise.
- Sal (voiced by Gilbert Gottfried) is the proprietor of the Slop Pail restaurant seen in "The Hankering". Mr. Krabs frequents the establishment until Sal decides to close it down permanently so he can pursue an acting career.
- Santa Claus makes several appearances throughout the series, portrayed in live-action form by series writer Michael Patrick Bell in "Christmas Who?", then in claymation by John Goodman for "It's a SpongeBob Christmas!". Lewis Black took over the role for later seasons, with Santa appearing traditionally animated and for a Kamp Koral episode in CGI. The Lewis Black version is generally annoyed by SpongeBob's antics, referring to him as "a menace" in a non-spiteful kind of way.
- Sea Monster (voiced by Gene Simmons) is a lizard-like sea monster who appears in "20,000 Patties Under the Sea". After having slept for 79 years, he demands for SpongeBob and Patrick to sell him food in exchange for giant dollar bills.
- Sharkface (voiced by Henry Winkler), Lonnie (voiced by Michael McKean), Ronnie (voiced by Clancy Brown) and Donnie (voiced by David Lander) are a street gang of sharks who appear in the episode "Sharks vs. Pods", in which SpongeBob joins them. They are actually dancers rather than fighters and are rivals to Squidward's gang, a group of octopuses called the Pods.
- Spot is Plankton's pet amoeba, who lives in the Chum Bucket with him and Karen. Spot behaves similarly to a puppy, is a good retriever, and can grow very large when he needs to protect his owner. He first appears in the season 9 episode "Plankton's Pet," and reappears in several episodes from season 11 onward.
- Squilliam Fancyson III (voiced by Dee Bradley Baker) is an octopus and Squidward Tentacles' arrogant, wealthy arch-rival, who has succeeded in everything Squidward had aspired to. He owns a four-story mansion with an expansive garden on the rooftop. He appears in six episodes throughout the first seven seasons, most notably in "Band Geeks" where Squidward finally emerges victorious against him by leading an unexpectedly successful band performance. Alternate versions of him appear in "Back to the Past" and "Code Yellow", but he has not made a physical appearance since "Keep Bikini Bottom Beautiful".
- Kelpy G (voiced by Rodger Bumpass) is a famous octopus musician who performs smooth jazz on his clarinet and is an idol of Squidward. Inspired by the performer Kenny G, Kelpy G is often shown as relatively indifferent to Squidward's admiration. He appears in many episodes throughout the series, but his major appearances are in "The Thing" and "Smoothe Jazz in Bikini Bottom". Kelpy G also makes a cameo appearance in the third SpongeBob movie, Sponge on the Run.
- Sticky Fins Whiting (voiced by Joe Pantoliano in "The Getaway" and "End of Summer Daze", Tom Kenny in "Captain Pipsqueak") is a prisoner who escapes from Bikini Bottom Prison in "The Getaway" and mistakes SpongeBob as his getaway driver which makes things worse for him. In "Captain Pipsqueak", Sticky Fins Whiting is among the villains auditioning to join E.V.I.L. In the Kamp Koral: SpongeBob's Under Years episode "End of Summer Daze", Whiting and Dorsal Dan show up at Kamp Koral where they end up hiding the loot they've stole in the pies that were made. Both of them were chased away by the jellyfish.
- Dorsal Dan (voiced by Steve Buscemi in "The Getaway", "Ain't That the Tooth", and "End of Summer Daze", Clancy Brown in "The Krusty Slammer", Rodger Bumpass in "Captain Pipsqueak") is a fish who was supposed to be Sticky Fins Whiting's getaway driver only for a mix-up involving SpongeBob to occur. In "Captain Pipsqueak", Dorsal Dan is among the villains auditioning to join E.V.I.L. In the Kamp Koral: SpongeBob's Under Years episode "End of Summer Daze", Dorsal Dan and Sticky Fins Whiting sho up at Kamp Koral where they end up hiding the loot they stole in the pies that were made. Both of them were chased away by the jellyfish.
- The Tattletale Strangler (voiced by Thomas F. Wilson) is a criminal fish who appears in "SpongeBob Meets the Strangler". He is detained for repeatedly strangling someone and promises to strangle SpongeBob when the latter has him arrested. He escapes from jail and pretends to be a bodyguard to get close to SpongeBob, but SpongeBob's behavior annoys him to the point where he would rather be back in prison. In "Captain Pipsqueak", the Tattletale Strangler" made a cameo among the villains auditioning to join E.V.I.L. When he objects to not going first, the Tattletale Strangler is zapped by Man Ray.
- Gene Scallop (voiced by Gene Shalit) is a fish food critic who makes a one time appearance in the episode "The Krusty Sponge". Alongside being voiced by Shalit, he is also heavily influenced by Shalit in his appearance and mannerisms. He hosts a segment called "Bottom Feeding" on Bikini Bottom News and inspires Mr. Krabs to rebrand the Krusty Krab with SpongeBob as the focal point.

==== Mermaid Man and Barnacle Boy enemies ====
In Mermaid Man and Barnacle Boy's show within a show and real-life, Mermaid Man and Barnacle Boy have fought an assortment of villains where some of them have encountered SpongeBob SquarePants and Patrick Star before. Some of them are shown to be members of the B.G.A.T.F.B.C. (short for Bad Guys All Together for Book Club) in "The Bad Guy Club for Villains". On occasion, some of Mermaid Man and Barnacle Boy's enemies come together as E.V.I.L. (short for Every Villain is Lemons).

Mermaid Man and Barnacle Boy's rogues gallery consists of:

- Atomic Flounder (voiced by Carlos Alazraqui in "Mermaid Man and Barnacle Boy II", Dee Bradley Baker in "The Bad Guy Club for Villains") is an irradiated flounder and one of the enemies of Mermaid Man and Barnacle Boy. In his youth, Atomic Flounder wore a hazmat suit. He was shown to have retired from crime. In "The Bad Guy Club for Villains", Atomic Flounder was redesigned where he now resembles a humanoid mutant flounder with an arm growing from his left arm and an eye growing from the right side of his eye. He was shown to be associated with the B.G.A.T.F.B.C.
- Dirty Bubble (voiced by Charles Nelson Reilly in his first appearance, Tom Kenny in later appearances) is a villain against Mermaid Man and Barnacle Boy. He is a giant brown bubble with a face that is vulnerable to pointy items. The Dirty Bubble was one of the founders of the evil organization E.V.I.L. in "Mermaid Man and Barnacle Boy V" and was part of the group again in "Captain Pipsqueak" and "Delivery of Doom". He is also shown to be a member of the B.G.A.T.F.B.C.
- Kelp Thing (voiced by Tom Kenny) is a kelp-themed supervillain who is an enemy of Mermaid Man and Barnacle Boy.
- Man Ray (voiced by John Rhys-Davies in his first two appearances, Bob Joles in later appearances) is a villain against Mermaid Man and Barnacle Boy. Man Ray has a man's body and a helmet shaped to look like a manta ray's head, which hides the fact that he does not have a head. He is a spoof of Aquaman's arch enemy, Black Manta. Though Man Ray retires as a supervillain in his first appearance, he later goes back to being a villain where he even became a founder of E.V.I.L. (short for Every Villain is Lemons) in "Mermaid Man and Barnacle Boy V" and was part of the group again in "Captain Pipsqueak" and "Delivery of Doom".
- The Moth (voiced by Mark Hamill) is a supervillain moth and an enemy of Mermaid Man and Barnacle Boy who appears in "Night Light". Even though he is minuscule, he has the strength to carry both SpongeBob's house and a lighthouse.
- Robot Mantis (vocal effects provided by Tom Kenny) is a robotic mantis that Mermaid Man and Barnacle Boy fought in the theme song seen in "The Bad Guy Club for Villains". In "Captain Pipsqueak", the Robot Mantis is among those that auditioned to join E.V.I.L. only to be destroyed by Man Ray because the piano belonging to Gramma that he turned into different instruments was just tuned.
- Sinister Slug (voiced by Mr. Lawrence) is a gray sea slug and an enemy of Mermaid Man and Barnacle Boy who can climb walls and shoot slime. He was shown to resemble a green sea slug in a green mask and outfit in "Mermaid Man and Barnacle Boy II". In "The Bad Guy Club for Villains", Sinister Slug was redesigned with a more realistic beige body, sharp teeth, and red eyes where he was shown to be a member of B.G.A.T.F.B.C.
- Jumbo Shrimp (voiced by Dee Bradley Baker) is a large muscular shrimp with super-strength who is an enemy of Mermaid Man and Barnacle Boy. He resembles a muscular pink shrimp in "Mermaid Man and Barnacle Boy II". In "The Bad Guy Club for Villains", Jumbo Shrimp was redesigned where he resembles a real shrimp with spiky antennae, muscular arms, four legs, and a long tail. He was also shown to be a member of B.G.A.T.F.B.C. In "Captain Pipsqueak" and "Delivery of Doom", Jumbo Shrimp is shown to be a member of E.V.I.L. Though the latter has him redesigned similar to his earlier appearances, but smaller and having four arms.
- Notodoris (voiced by Jill Talley) is a notodoris minor who appeared in "Captain Pipsqueak" as a member of E.V.I.L. She appears to have fought Mermaid Man and Barnacle Boy before as she was seen with E.V.I.L. in an episode of The New Adventures of Mermaid Man and Barnacle Boy lowering them into a vat of molten lava.
- Sub-Marinara (vocal effects provided by Danny Giovannini) is a little person in a full diving suit who operates a submarine/meatball submarine sandwich with legs. He appears in "Delivery of Doom" as a member of E.V.I.L. where the narrator had to remind SpongeBob SquarePants who he was.

==== International Justice League of Super Acquaintances ====
The International Justice League of Super Acquaintances (or IJLSA for short) are a group of the ocean's greatest superheroes that Mermaid Man and Barnacle Boy are associated with. An earlier version of the group was called the International Justice Lodge of Super Acquaintances as seen in "The Bad Guy Club for Villains".

In "Mermaid Man and Barnacle Boy V", SpongeBob and his friends had to pose as some of its members to help Mermaid Man fight E.V.I.L. In "The Bad Guy Club for Villains", it was shown that Mermaid Man and Barnacle Boy's enemies were not familiar with them at first.

- Quickster - A superhero and member of the IJLSA with super-speed. SpongeBob SquarePants once operated as him.
- Captain Magma - A superhero with a volcano on his head and member of the IJLSA that can shoot lava when "Krakatoa" is shouted. Squidward Tentacles once operated as him.
- Professor Magma (vocal effects provided by Tom Kenny) - A magma-themed superhero and member of the IJLSA that was seen in "The Bad Guy Club for Villains".
- Elastic Waistband (voiced by Dee Bradley Baker) - An elastic superhero and member of the IJLSA. In "Mermaid Man and Barnacle Boy V", Elastic Waistband is shown to have elasticity where Patrick Star once operated as him. In "The Bad Guy Club for Villains", Elastic Waistband was redesigned where his torso can inflate to ball shape when he unbuckles his waistband.
- Miss Appear (voiced by Sirena Irwin) is a superhero with invisibility and member of the IJLSA. In "The Bad Guy Club for Villains", Miss Appear was redesigned to resemble a parody of Wonder Woman.
- Pyrite Ponderer (voiced by Tom Kenny) is a pyrite-themed superhero and member of the IJLSA who wields the Hairnet of Knowledge that can do other things. He is known for giving advice and making comments like "Do we really exist" and "violence resolves nothing".

=== Film characters ===
- Princess Mindy (voiced by Scarlett Johansson) is King Neptune's daughter. She is Patrick's love interest. She is a motherly and friendly person and a very good friend of SpongeBob and Patrick. She appears in The SpongeBob SquarePants Movie. She isn't mentioned in the TV series, but does appear in the special "SpongeBob's Big Birthday Blowout".
- Dennis (voiced by Alec Baldwin in the film, Clancy Brown in the TV series) is a hitman hired by Plankton to assassinate SpongeBob and Patrick before they are able to retrieve King Neptune's crown from Shell City. Before he manages to do that however he is first stomped by the Cyclops and then hit by a pier. He only appeared in The SpongeBob SquarePants Movie and made a speaking cameo in "Captain Pipsqueak" where he was the receptionist for E.V.I.L.
- The Cyclops (performed by Aaron Hendry, vocal effects provided by Neil Ross) is a marine diver who is always seen wearing an atmospheric diving suit and helmet, even when not underwater, and never talks but only grunts appearing only in The SpongeBob SquarePants Movie. He is actually a normal adult man; however, because humans tower virtually all sea life, Mindy describes him as "the worst of all hazards". He is the owner of "Shell City", which is really the name of a seaside gift and souvenir shop.
- Burger-Beard the Pirate (portrayed by Antonio Banderas) is a pirate who, upon discovering a book capable of rewriting reality, steals the Krabby Patty formula to open up a fast food drive-in while also changing Bikini Bottom into a wasteland. He appears in The SpongeBob Movie: Sponge Out of Water as the film's main antagonist.
- Kyle (voiced by Paul Tibbitt in the US version, Joe Sugg in the UK version, Robert Irwin in the Australian version) is an innocent seagull that listens to the stories of Burger-Beard. He appears in The SpongeBob Movie: Sponge Out of Water.
- Bubbles (voiced by Matt Berry in the film, Jeff Bennett in the video game) is a god-like bottlenose dolphin who is the overseer of the universe, watching them from a triangular building in outer space. SpongeBob and Plankton accidentally end up in his audience while using Karen's time machine in The SpongeBob Movie: Sponge Out of Water.
- King Poseidon (voiced by Matt Berry) is the ruler of the seven seas who resides in Atlantic City and is much different from King Neptune. He uses snails' slime as face cream to look younger, which is the reason he kidnapped SpongeBob's pet snail Gary once he was all out of snails. He only appeared in The SpongeBob Movie: Sponge on the Run.
- Chancellor (voiced by Reggie Watts) is King Poseidon's assistant. He appears in The SpongeBob Movie: Sponge on the Run.
- Sage (portrayed by Keanu Reeves) is a tumbleweed with a human face who helps SpongeBob on his quest to save Gary. He appears in The SpongeBob Movie: Sponge on the Run.
- El Diablo (portrayed by Danny Trejo) is the leader of vampire cowboy zombies whom SpongeBob and Patrick encountered in their dream. He appears in The SpongeBob Movie: Sponge on the Run.
- The Gambler (portrayed by Snoop Dogg) is a human in Goner Gulch. He appears in The SpongeBob Movie: Sponge on the Run.
- Sue Nahmee (portrayed by Wanda Sykes) is the human head of B.O.O.T.S. (short for Bureau Of Official Texas Science) who is the main antagonist of Saving Bikini Bottom: The Sandy Cheeks Movie
  - Kyle (portrayed by Matty Cardarople) is a man who is one of the assistants of Sue Nahmee.
  - Phoebe (portrayed by Ilia Isorelýs Paulino) is a woman who is one of the assistants of Sue Nahmee.

=== Spin-off characters ===
- Nobby and Narlene (voiced by Carlos Alazraqui and Kate Higgins) are characters in the spin-off series Kamp Koral: SpongeBob's Under Years. They are a pair of hillbilly narwhals who live in the Kelp Forest. The narwhal siblings have crossed over into the main series on different occasions: the episodes "Something Narwhal This Way Comes", "Upturn Girls", "Sandy, Help Us!", "In the Mood to Feud", and "Kreepaway Kamp". In the main series, Nobby is shown to be larger and muscular while Narlene was just taller.
- Harvey (voiced by Carlos Alazraqui) is a nerd in Kamp Koral: SpongeBob's Under Years who resides in Pontoon Cabin with Bubble Bass and Kevin C. Cucumber. He later crossed over into the main series where the threesome made up a Captain Quasar fan club in "Captain Quasar: The Next Iteration" which SpongeBob, Patrick, and Squidina tried to get into.
- Roh and Rea (voiced by Bill Fagerbakke and Carolyn Lawrence respectively) are two rich fish that are Upturn's cabinmates at Yacht Cabin. They later crossed over into the main series.
- Regigilled (voiced by Rodger Bumpass) is an octopus who works as a butler at Kamp Koral's Yacht Cabin serving Lady Upturn, Roh, and Rea. He later crossed over into the main series where he is still working for Lady Upturn.
- The Wise Kraken (voiced by Brad Garrett impersonating Rodney Dangerfield, Jess Harnell also impersonating Dangerfield in "Kreepaway Kamp", "Rube Tube", and "SpongeBob and Patrick's Time Twist-Up") is a kraken in Kamp Koral: SpongeBob's Under Years that was seen living in the lake at Kamp Koral where he is shown to have a comedic side. He later crossed over into the main series where he appeared at the end of "Abandon Twits".
- Jimmy Blobfish (voiced by John Gegenhuber) is a blobfish in Kamp Koral: SpongeBob's Under Years who resides in Trawler Cabin with "Kidferatu". In "Kreepaway Kamp", Jimmy Blobfish appeared taller and thinner when he reunites with his cabin mates. He admits that he missed how he looked when he was young.
- Preda Tory (voiced by Grey DeLisle) is a sea spider in Kamp Koral: SpongeBob's Under Years who resides in Trawler Cabin with "Kidferatu".
- Roxy is a duo consisting of the anglerfish Big Roxy (voiced by Grey DeLisle) and the anglerfish lure Little Roxy (voiced by Kate Higgins) that appear in Kamp Koral: SpongeBob's Under Years. They reside in Trawler Cabin with "Kidferatu". In "Kreepaway Kamp", their positions have switched where Big Roxy is now elderly and small is now taller and no longer glowing at the time when they reunited with their cabin mates.
- Cecil Star (voiced by Thomas F. Wilson) and Bunny Star (voiced by Cree Summer) are Patrick's parents in the spin-off series The Patrick Star Show. Cecil works at the Undersea Space Center while Bunny works from home. Cecil later appeared in the Kamp Koral: SpongeBob's Under Years episode "Help Not Wanted" where he visits his son and was revealed to have been a former camper at Kamp Koral as well as made cameos in the main series.
- Squidina Star (voiced by Jill Talley) is a purple squid. She was first introduced in "Goons on the Moon" as a teenage friend of Pearl. In the spin-off The Patrick Star Show, Squidina is Patrick's adopted sister and the director and producer of Patrick's imaginary talk show. She later crossed over into the main series where she sported a tuft of hair on her head and was first seen in "Captain Quasar: The Next Iteration".
- GrandPat Star (voiced by Dana Snyder) is Patrick's grandfather and Cecil's father in The Patrick Star Show. He is the smartest member of the Star family.
- Ouchie (vocal effects provided by Tom Kenny) is a sea urchin who is the Star family's pet in The Patrick Star Show.
- Tinkle (vocal effects provided by Dee Bradley Baker) is a sentient toilet in The Patrick Star Show.
- Pinkeye (vocal effects provided by Jill Talley) is a sea bunny in The Patrick Star Show. While often shown to be feuding with Ouchie, they get along well when they are with Tinkle.
- Dr. Plankenstein (voiced by Mr. Lawrence) is a mad scientist counterpart of Sheldon Plankton who lives in a black and white gothic castle. He is shown to dislike "The Patrick Show" and is shown to use his experiments and inventions for evil. Dr. Plankenstein is a parody of Victor Frankenstein.
  - Pat-gor (voiced by Bill Fagerbakke) is the assistant of Dr. Plankenstein and a hunchbacked counterpart of Patrick Star. He is shown to be a fan of "The Patrick Show" much to the dismay of Dr. Plankenstein. Pat-gor is a parody of Igor.
  - SpongeMonster (voiced by Tom Kenny) is the monstrous creation of Dr. Plankenstein who is on good terms with Pat-gor and a counterpart of SpongeBob SquarePants. He is a parody of Frankenstein's monster.
- Captain Doug Quasar (voiced by Rodger Bumpass) is a shark space captain who is the star of his own TV show. He later crossed over into the main series where he appeared in "Captain Quasar: The Next Iteration" where he has become old, yet manages to best his reboot counterpart.
  - Pat-Tron (voiced by Bill Fagerbakke) is a starfish robot counterpart of Patrick Star and sidekick of Captain Doug Quasar whose incompetent actions causes trouble for Quasar. He later crossed over into the main series where he appeared in "Captain Quasar: The Next Iteration" where he has become old, yet manages to best his reboot counterpart.
- Pat the Hapless (voiced by Bill Fagerbakke) is a starfish barbarian counterpart of Patrick Star who lives in the land of Patgar and the star of his self-titled comic series.
- Fentin Finkle (voiced by Gracen Newton) is a red crab kid who was originally the intern for Squidina in "Squidina's Little Helper" before stealing from the Star family to start The Crabina Show that her older sister Crabina starred in. In "Best Served Cold", Fentin is jealous with Squidina's success and joins with the other characters who had grievences with the Star Family in a revenge plot.
- FitzPatrick (voiced by Henry Rollins) is the evil cousin of Patrick who appears in his self-titled episode.

=== Families ===
==== SquarePants ====
- BlackJack SquarePants (voiced by John DiMaggio) is SpongeBob's cousin who bullied him during their childhoods. In his lone appearance, BlackJack was imprisoned for littering but has since been released. While he appeared large in flashbacks, BlackJack somehow shrunk by the present day.
- Stanley S. SquarePants (voiced by Christopher Guest) is SpongeBob's cousin who appears solely in the episode "Stanley S. SquarePants". SpongeBob receives Stanley in a package sent by his Uncle Clem, who is relieved to have sent Stanley, since he would destroy anything he touches. True to this, despite SpongeBob trying to teach him, Stanley constantly destroys everything and almost makes SpongeBob lose his job until SpongeBob told the truth to Mr. Krabs. This leads to Mr. Krabs hooking Stanley up with Plankton where he accidentally wrecks The Chum Bucket.
- Captain Blue SquarePants (voiced by Garnett Sailor) is SpongeBob's uncle who only appears in the episode "BlackJack". He is a retired police captain and lives right next to SpongeBob's cousin BlackJack. In the episode, SpongeBob goes to his house to help him stop BlackJack from torturing SpongeBob's parents. However, he can't hear over the lawnmower and thinks SpongeBob wants to help him mow the lawn. It goes on like this for other noisy objects such as a blender, a radio with static, and a phonograph. When he finally hears the news, he drives SpongeBob over to BlackJack's house, but he warns SpongeBob to be careful.
- Grandma SquarePants (voiced by Marion Ross) is SpongeBob's paternal grandmother. She spoils SpongeBob whenever he visits her house with cookies, milk, sweaters, and bedtime stories, even though it can embarrass SpongeBob.

==== Star ====
- Herb and Margie Star are Patrick's parents in the original series. Their identities are temporarily taken by another starfish couple named Marty and Janet in "I'm with Stupid". In "Rule of Dumb", it is revealed that Herb is a brother of Gary's father, Sluggo, making Patrick and Gary first cousins. The characters were later dropped when Cecil Star and Bunny Star were created.

==== Tentacles ====
- Mrs. Tentacles (voiced by Rodger Bumpass in most appearances, Dee Bradley Baker in "Fools in April") is Squidward's elderly mother. In earlier episodes, she only appears as hallucinations tormenting Squidward, but later appears in person in "Krusty Towers". She lives in a moai like Squidward, but with a curly hair-like structure on its roof and earring-like balls hanging from the sides. In "Momageddon", Mrs. Tentacles underwent a redesign that left her less wrinkly.
- Jeff Tentacles (voiced by Tom Kenny in "Kamp Kow" and "Momageddon", Henry Winkler in "Jeffy T's Prank Emporium") is Squidward's father who was mentioned before appearing in "Kamp Kow". He showed up in person in "Momageddon" where he had a brown moustache. In "Jeffy T.'s Prankwell Emporium", Jeff is the proprietor of "Jeffy T's Prankwell Emporium" and was redesigned with a white moustache, balding gray hair, and pale yellow skin.
- Grandma Tentacles (voiced by Mary Jo Catlett in "Chum Fricasse", Cree Summer in later appearances and The Patrick Star Show) is Squidward's paternal grandmother. She was originally mentioned in "Sandy's Rocket" before appearing in person in "Chum Fricasse" where Mr. Krabs tipped her off about Squidward and Plankton misusing her famous chum fricasse recipe by not letting it cook for 24 hours and had the customers wreck the Chum Bucket in retaliation. Then she dragged Squidward away to deal with him. In The Patrick Star Show, Grandma Tentacles is shown to be the Star family's neighbor where she would be annoyed with their shenanigans. She is also shown to have an on-again off-again dating relationship with GrandPat Star in some episodes.

==== Cheeks ====
- Pa Cheeks (voiced by Craig Robinson) is the father of Sandy Cheeks.
- Ma Cheeks (voiced by Grey DeLisle) is the mother of Sandy Cheeks.
- Granny Cheeks (voiced by Grey DeLisle) is the grandmother of Sandy Cheeks and the mother of Pa Cheeks.
- Randy Cheeks (voiced by Johnny Knoxville) is the twin brother of Sandy Cheeks.
- Rowdy Cheeks (voiced by Grey DeLisle) is the younger sister of Sandy Cheeks.
- Rosie Cheeks (voiced by Grey DeLisle) is the younger sister of Sandy Cheeks and the twin sister of Rowdy Cheeks.

==== Krabs ====
- "Mama" Krabs (voiced by Paul Tibbitt in season 2–3, Sirena Irwin in season 4–6) is Mr. Krabs' overbearing mother who still treats him slightly like a child. She is a friend of Old Man Jenkins. She first appears in "Sailor Mouth" and has been mostly retired from the show, aside from appearances in "Lame and Fortune" and later "Momageddon". Although her name is not officially mentioned in the series, she is referred to as "Betsy" in some merchandising.
- Grandpa Redbeard (voiced by Dennis Quaid in "Grandpappy the Pirate", Clancy Brown in "Senior Discount") is Mr. Krabs' paternal grandfather who is a pirate. In "Grandpappy the Pirate", he visits his grandson, thinking that the latter is also a pirate instead of the owner of a restaurant. Mr. Krabs tries not to disappoint Redbeard by disguising the Krusty Krab as a pirate ship, pretending Pearl is a sea monster, and dressing his employees as sailors.
- Great Grandpop Krabs (voiced by Clancy Brown) is the great-grandfather of Mr. Krabs who appears in "Senior Discount".

==== Plankton ====
- Gordon Plankton (voiced by Clancy Brown) is Plankton's hillbilly father. In "Blood is Thicker than Grease and Oil", Gordon leads his family in opening a potato restaurant next to Plankton after winning the lottery. It doesn't last long when Plankton joined the business after failing to ruin it and placing chum in the potatoes. In "In the Mood to Feud", it is revealed that Gordon's hillbilly family has feuded with Nobby and Narlene's family over the field of bumble jellies (a bumblebee version of jellyfish) in between their properties in Bikini Holler.
- Ma Plankton (voiced by Kate Higgins) is Plankton's hillbilly mother.
- Grand Dad Plankton (voiced by Paul Tibbitt) is the father of Gordon Plankton and the grandfather of Plankton.
- Granny Plankton (voiced by Laraine Newman) is Plankton's grandmother.
- Clem Plankton (voiced by Dee Bradley Baker in "Plankton's Army", Bill Fagerbakke in "Plankton's Robotic Revenge", Carlos Alazraqui in "Something Narwhal This Way Comes", Tom Kenny in "In the Mood to Feud") is Plankton's cousin and the leader of the rest of Plankton's cousins.
- Plankton's Cousins (variously voiced by Carlos Alazraqui, Dee Bradley Baker, Clancy Brown, Rodger Bumpass, Bill Fagerbakke, Tom Kenny, Carolyn Lawrence, and Jill Talley) are the rest of Plankton's hillbilly cousins where most of them aren't named.

==== Narwhal ====
- Pa Narwhal (voiced by Tom Kenny) is the father of Nobby and Narlene and the patriarch of their hillbilly narwhal family. The episode "In the Mood to Feud" revealed that Pa Narwhal's family have been feuding with Plankton's family over the field of bumble jellies in between their properties in Bikini Holler.
- Ma Narwhal (voiced by Jill Talley) is the mother of Nobby and Narlene and the matriarch of their hillbilly narwhal family.
- WillyBob (voiced by Tom Kenny) is the cousin of Nobby and Narlene who appears in the main series episode "Something Narwhal This Way Comes".
- Hatty McDoody (voiced by Jack McBrayer) is the cousin of Nobby and Narlene who appears in two episodes of "Kamp Koral: SpongeBob's Under Years".

==== Ancestors ====
- Primitive Sponge and Primitive Star (voiced by Tom Kenny and Bill Fagerbakke) are the earliest known ancestors of SpongeBob and Patrick, who appear in the episode "SB-129" when Squidward time-travels to the past. Upon seeing the two of them electrocuting themselves with a jellyfish, Squidward inadvertently teaches them the sport of Jellyfishing, which results in Squidward being documented as the inventor of Jellyfishing when he returns to the present. They also seem to strongly dislike Squidward's clarinet music, as they ruthlessly chase down Squidward upon hearing it. The scene where Primitive Sponge and Primitive Star are confronted by Squidward upon noticing them torturing themselves with the jellyfish, particularly, the pose struck by Primitive Sponge, has become an internet meme, referred to as "SpongeGar" (which was actually the name given to another of SpongeBob's primitive ancestors in the episode "Ugh").
- SpongeGar, Patar, and Squog (voiced by Tom Kenny, Bill Fagerbakke, and Rodger Bumpass) are SpongeBob, Patrick, and Squidward's neolithic ancestors who appear in "Ugh." While still not being able to speak intelligibly, they are more advanced than the primitive ancestors in "SB-129" as they are shown to use stone tools and fire. Also appearing in the episode are Primitive Gary (voiced by Tom Kenny), Gary's gigantic ancestor and SpongeGar's pet, and Primitive Krabs (voiced by Clancy Brown), Mr. Krabs' tiny ancestor who repeatedly chants "money."
- SpongeTron and Patron (voiced by Tom Kenny and Bill Fagerbakke) are SpongeBob and Patrick's robotic descendants who appear in "SB-129". SpongeTron has 486 clones, each one named after a letter of the English alphabet from 2,000 years in the future, while Patron has two heads.
- SpongeBuck SquarePants, Pecos Patrick, Hopalong Tentacles, William Krabs, Polene Puff, and Dead Eye Plankton (voiced by Tom Kenny, Bill Fagerbakke, Rodger Bumpass, Clancy Brown, Mary Jo Catlett, and Mr. Lawrence) are the main characters' wild west ancestors who appear in "Pest of the West". They lived in the town of Bikini Gulch and frequented an old-fashioned bar version of the Krusty Krab called the Krusty Kantina.
- Squidly Tentacles, King Krabs, Princess Pearl, Dark Knight, Planktonamor, and Karen the Crystal Ball (voiced by Rodger Bumpass, Clancy Brown, Lori Alan, Carolyn Lawrence, Mr. Lawrence, and Jill Talley) are the medieval counterparts of the main characters who appear in "Dunces and Dragons". The present-day SpongeBob and Patrick are magically transported to their times and help save Princess Pearl from Planktonamor. Planktonamor additionally keeps a pet, the Dragon Jellyfish, who is a giant jellyfish with a mane and a tail.

== Reception ==
The characters of SpongeBob SquarePants have been well-received overall. The titular character SpongeBob has become very popular with children and adults. The character's popularity has spread from Nickelodeon's original demographic of two- to eleven-year-olds, to teenagers and adults. The popularity of SpongeBob translated well into sales figures. In 2002, SpongeBob SquarePants dolls sold at a rate of 75,000 per week, which was faster than Tickle Me Elmo dolls were selling at the time. SpongeBob has gained popularity in Japan, specifically with Japanese women. Nickelodeon's parent company Viacom purposefully targeted marketing at women in the country as a method of building the SpongeBob SquarePants brand. Skeptics initially doubted that SpongeBob could be popular in Japan as the character's design is very different from already popular designs for Hello Kitty and Pikachu. However, the characters have also attracted some negative reception, including SpongeBob himself, who was listed as number four on AskMen's Top 10: Irritating '90s Cartoon Characters. Nevertheless, SpongeBob SquarePants was ranked ninth on TV Guide's top 50 cartoon characters.

The show's characters have received recognition from celebrities and well-known figures in media. Barack Obama named SpongeBob his favorite television character in 2007 and admitted that SpongeBob SquarePants was "the show I watch with my daughters." British Prime Minister Gordon Brown has also said he watches the show with his children. Sigourney Weaver and Bruce Willis were reported to be fans of the SpongeBob character in 2008. Film critic A. O. Scott named Squidward, Mrs. Puff, and Sandy his favorite characters on the show in 2004. American singer Pharrell Williams, who says he is a fan of the show, said that "Squidward is my favorite, though. If he was a human, I would hang out with him." Fashion designer Peter Jensen designed a line of sweatshirts inspired by SpongeBob and called Mrs. Puff his "absolute favorite" character in an interview with Women's Wear Daily. Peter Keepnews of The New York Times commended Patrick, calling him "a popular character, and the new episodes illustrate why: He is unfailingly enthusiastic, touchingly loyal and absolutely undeterred by his intellectual limitations. Hilariously voiced by Bill Fagerbakke, he is not just an endearing comic creation but a role model for idiots everywhere."

The show's voice actors have received attention from honorary organizations for the portrayals of their characters. Mary Jo Catlett and Tom Kenny were both nominated at the 29th Annie Awards ceremony in 2001 for their vocal performances as Mrs. Puff and SpongeBob. Kenny received an additional two nominations at the 2008 and 2010 ceremonies, the latter of which he won for voicing SpongeBob in "Truth or Square". In 2012, Rodger Bumpass' performance as Squidward was nominated for Outstanding Performer in an Animated Program at the 39th Daytime Emmy Awards. Additionally, Patrick as a character won in the category "Favorite Animated Animal Sidekick" at the 2014 Kids' Choice Awards.

== Appearances in other media ==
The characters of SpongeBob SquarePants appeared in the 2004 theatrical film The SpongeBob SquarePants Movie and its 2015 sequel. Both films feature the regular television cast and blend animated elements with live-action sequences. They have also been featured in a variety of associated merchandise, particularly video games; from 2001 to 2013, the SpongeBob franchise had multiple video games released each year, with the show's voice cast reprising their character roles for many titles. Every main cast member with the exception of Clancy Brown has voiced their respective characters in each game that they appear; Brown's character Mr. Krabs is instead voiced by Joe Whyte in SuperSponge, Operation Krabby Patty, and Battle for Bikini Bottom and by Bob Joles in the Truth or Square game.

The SpongeBob characters have been featured at a variety of theme park attractions. In 2003, Kings Island announced plans to build the first SpongeBob-themed amusement park ride, a dark ride roller coaster titled "Mrs. Puff's Crash Course Boating School". Plans were halted when Kings Island changed ownership, and the first ride featuring SpongeBob theming was instead "SpongeBob's Boatmobiles"—also based on Mrs. Puff's Boating School and opened in 2003—at California's Great America. Amusement rides based on the characters have since been opened at Blackpool Pleasure Beach, Dreamworld, Movie Park Germany, and Nickelodeon Universe. Two 4D films featuring 3-D models of the characters and a motion simulator experience, SpongeBob SquarePants 4-D and The Great Jelly Rescue, were sold to theme parks and aquariums worldwide in 2005 and 2013 respectively.

Mascot costumes of the SpongeBob characters debuted at Nickelodeon Suites Resort in 2005 and have made regular appearances at Nickelodeon events since. Plankton, Karen, and Gary are the only main characters who have never been realized as mascots; at events, they are normally depicted as puppets or statues instead. In December 2011, a parade of SpongeBob mascots and floats titled "SpongeBob ParadePants" opened at Sea World Australia. In November 2017, a Broadway musical based on the show began previews at the Palace Theatre, and opened in December 2017. Unlike previous shows, the characters were not represented with mascot costumes but by actors wearing clothing inspired by the characters' designs.

=== Popular culture ===
The characters of SpongeBob SquarePants have appeared throughout popular culture. In 2007, the Amsterdam-based company Boom Chicago created a SpongeBob parody called "SpongeBob SquarePants in China", in which a stereotypically Chinese Patrick refuses to go to work and advocates freedom of speech, rights of leisure, and income. During the same year, production company Camp Chaos created a SpongeBob parody titled SpongeBong HempPants, which features five of the series' characters parodied in the form of various drugs. The show was seen on VH1 and Comedy Central, both owned by Nickelodeon's parent company Viacom. Comedy Central's Drawn Together also features a parody of SpongeBob named "Wooldoor Sockbat" whose theme tune is inspired by SpongeBob's Hawaiian-style background music. Two animated series that former SpongeBob writer Dan Povenmire worked on have incorporated references to the characters; the Phineas and Ferb special "Summer Belongs to You" features a joke in which Phineas Flynn holds up inanimate representations of SpongeBob and Patrick, and the Family Guy episode "Road to Rupert" includes SpongeBob's "Campfire Song Song" from "The Camping Episode". SpongeBob, Patrick, Mr. Krabs, Pearl and Squidward all appear in "Major League of Extraordinary Gentlemen", an episode of the sketch comedy Robot Chicken. A segment of the episode, animated in stop motion with SpongeBob toy figures, features Mr. Krabs using crab legs as the secret ingredient for Krabby Patties. In April 2016, Nintendo's Wii U exclusive Splatoon released a splatfest based on the eponymous series by teaming two characters SpongeBob and Patrick, hosted by the pop band Squid Sisters: Callie and Marie, the event began for 24 hours and Team Patrick won.
