= SpongeBob's Atlantis SquarePantis =

2007 episode of SpongeBob SquarePants directed by Andrew Overtoom

- DVD cover
- Also known as: SpongeBob in Atlantis, Atlantis SquarePantis (title card)
- Based on: SpongeBob SquarePants by Stephen Hillenburg
- Written by: Casey Alexander; Zeus Cervas; Dani Michaeli; Steven Banks
- Story by: Dani Michaeli
- Directed by: Vincent Waller; Paul Tibbitt
- Starring: Tom Kenny; Bill Fagerbakke; Rodger Bumpass; Clancy Brown; Carolyn Lawrence; Mr. Lawrence; Paul Tibbitt; David Bowie
- Music by: Nicolas Carr; Eban Schletter
- Country of origin: United States

Production
- Executive producer: Stephen Hillenburg
- Producer: Paul Tibbitt
- Cinematography: Erik Conhamg
- Editor: Margaret Hou
- Running time: 40 minutes and 30 seconds
- Production companies: United Plankton Pictures; Nickelodeon Animation Studio

Original release
- Network: Nickelodeon
- Release: November 12, 2007

SpongeBob's Atlantis SquarePantis is the first television film and the 92nd episode of the American animated television series SpongeBob SquarePants, and a 2007 made-for-television musical comedy film directed by Andrew Overtoom. It first aired on Nickelodeon in the United States on November 12, 2007, serving as the seventeenth episode of the fifth season of the American animated television series SpongeBob SquarePants. It released again on November 23, 2007 with Patchy segments. In the special, SpongeBob and Patrick discover a half of an ancient medallion that helps them and their friends get to the lost city of Atlantis. It was written by Casey Alexander, Zeus Cervas, Steven Banks, and Dani Michaeli. British musician and actor David Bowie guest starred as the voice of Lord Royal Highness. Upon release, it attracted an estimated 9.22 million viewers, becoming the most watched episode of the entire series. Despite this, it received mixed reviews from critics and audiences alike, while the Patchy subplot received mixed to negative reviews.

== Plot ==
=== Patchy the Pirate subplot ===
Patchy the Pirate is stuck in traffic on US 101 near Encino and becomes angry that he is going to miss the new SpongeBob episode. His cell phone rings, and Potty tells him to hurry because the episode is about to start. Patchy tells Potty to record the episode, but Potty tells him that he threw the Betamax machine in the garbage, angering Patchy. The traffic line moves, but Patchy soon discovers that Encino has vanished.

Later, Patchy hallucinates finding a man dressed in a tall SpongeBob outfit, who tells him that he is SpongeBob SquarePants. The SpongeBob then tells him that he will be back in Encino if he "believes." He is woken up by Potty but learns that Encino is still missing.

After the end of the SpongeBob special, Patchy finds Encino shrunk to a tiny size and meets a family of three aliens, who explain that their son, Norbluck 5, was messing around with their shrink ray again. Patchy demands that the aliens return his town to full size, and they do so. After gratefully arriving back in his house in Encino, Patchy is crushed by a giant Potty the Parrot.

=== SpongeBob plot ===
SpongeBob and Patrick are trying to take photos of bubbles they blew, but fail to do so. SpongeBob blows another bubble they can fit in, and they end up floating away in it to a cave, where they find a piece of a medallion to the lost city of Atlantis. Unaware of what it is, they take it to the Bikini Bottom Museum and run into Squidward, who thinks they stole the other displayed half of the medallion. He soon realizes they found the missing half and tells them it is the key to Atlantis. After hearing the story of Atlantis, the only thing SpongeBob and Patrick want to see is the city's attraction, the "World's Oldest Bubble." Squidward proceeds to reconnect the two halves of the amulet, opening the "path to Atlantis," a bus that runs on "song fuel." The trio is joined by Mr. Krabs and Sandy, with the characters crash-landing into Atlantis. The group is unknowingly followed by Plankton, who plans to use the city's powerful weapons for his scheme.

They meet the Atlantean Emperor, Lord Royal Highness, inside Atlantis, who shows them a grand tour of the fortress. During the tour, Mr. Krabs, Sandy, and Squidward each get distracted by places in Atlantis. Mr. Krabs by the treasury room, Sandy by the science laboratory, and Squidward by the art gallery. Meanwhile, Plankton enters the armory vault and steals a tank. SpongeBob and Patrick get to see the world's oldest living bubble, but Patrick takes a picture of it, horrifying the pair as it accidentally pops.

As Mr. Krabs, Sandy, and Squidward relate their experiences to Lord Royal Highness, SpongeBob and Patrick attempt to conceal the bubble's destruction until they blurt it out. Lord Royal Highness reveals that the bubble they popped was just a prop for the tourists and shows them the real oldest bubble, which Patrick pops it by mistake. Angered, Lord Royal Highness summons the Atlantean Royal Guards to attack the group, but they manage to escape. Just as they flee outside, Plankton arrives in the stolen tank and fires at them, only to discover that it shoots ice cream. Lord Royal Highness captures Plankton and decides that "a talking speck" would be a fantastic replacement for the bubble. SpongeBob and his friends leave for Bikini Bottom on the bus, as Lord Royal Highness takes the medallion and orders one of his guards to throw it away.

SpongeBob and the others sing one last song, with the former being the only one happy to go home, as the episode ends.

== Cast ==
- Tom Kenny as SpongeBob SquarePants and SpongeBob hallucination (voice)
  - Kenny also voices Gary the Snail and portrays Patchy the Pirate
- Bill Fagerbakke as Patrick Star
- Clancy Brown as Mr. Krabs
- Rodger Bumpass as Squidward Tentacles
- Carolyn Lawrence as Sandy Cheeks
- Mr. Lawrence as Plankton
- David Bowie as Lord Royal Highness
- Paul Tibbitt as Potty the Parrot
- David Glen Eisley as Singer
- Deric Battiste as Nigite
- David J. Steinberg as SpongeBob hallucination (uncredited)

== Production ==
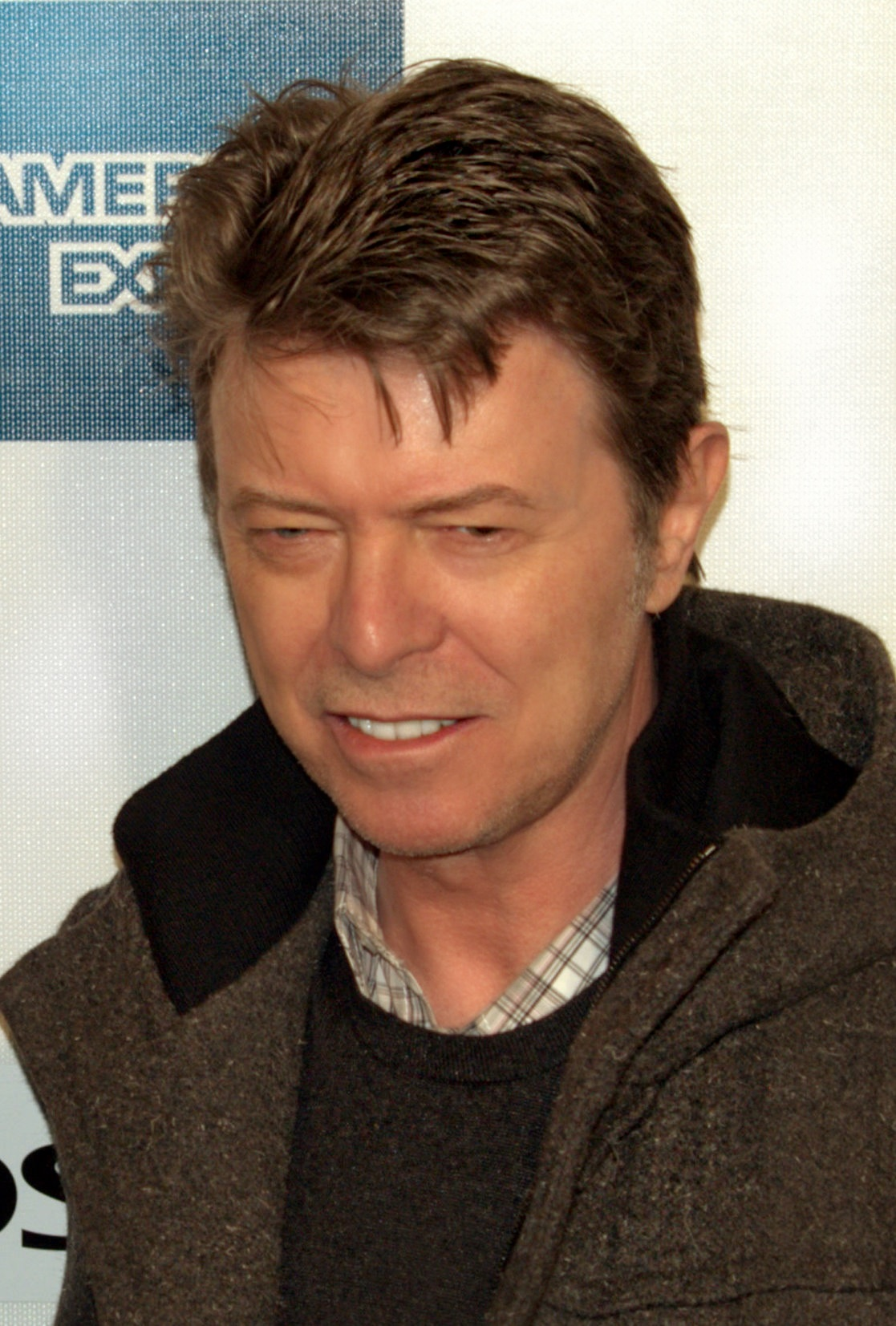
David Bowie guest starred as the voice of Lord Royal Highness.

Atlantis SquarePantis was written by Casey Alexander, Zeus Cervas, Steven Banks and Dani Michaeli, with Alexander and Cervas serving as storyboard directors, and the animation was directed by Andrew Overtoom. Although it was promoted by Nickelodeon as the first made-for-television film of the series, Atlantis SquarePantis is an extended episode, running 45 minutes. "[Atlantis SquarePantis is] an adventurous quest kind of a story," said Tom Kenny, the voice of SpongeBob, "about SpongeBob and his friends journeying and discovering the lost continent of Atlantis, which is ruled by a character voiced by David Bowie."

The film stars the series main cast members including Kenny, Bill Fagerbakke, Rodger Bumpass, Clancy Brown, Carolyn Lawrence, and Mr. Lawrence. In addition to the regular series voice cast, famed British musician and artist David Bowie guest starred as the voice of the Atlantean King, Lord Royal Highness. Writing on his blog, David Bowie said:

It's happened. At last. I've hit the Holy Grail of animation gigs. Yesterday I got to be a character on ... tan-tara ... SpongeBob SquarePants. Oh Yeah!! We, the family, are thrilled. Nothing else need happen this year, well, this week anyway. My character in this special longform (I think a half-hour special) show is called 'Lord Royal Highness'. Alrighteee!!

Tom Kenny said "the people who [watch] are often surprising to me and unexpected. You don't picture David Bowie, the Thin White Duke, sitting on the couch in his pajamas eating Cheerios watching SpongeBob cartoons. [With] our little basic-cable budget we could never afford to pay a legend like David Bowie what he's worth, but the fact he wants to be in something his kid likes is what gets the ball rolling."

The film includes 33 minutes of animation. Its animators at the Nickelodeon Animation Studios at Burbank, California sketched the outlines of the story in a year. Paul Tibbitt, the show's supervising producer who also serves as the showrunner, explained "We're one of the last shows that does it the old-fashioned way, like they used to do it back in the Warner Brothers days."

== Release ==
Atlantis SquarePantis originally aired on Nickelodeon in the United States on November 12, 2007, preceding a 12-hour SpongeBob marathon. After the premiere, the Behind the Pantis special aired featuring the production of the film from story pitch and animation to voice-recording sessions. It was proclaimed "the most special special that's ever been called a special." Jim Blake's music track "Food Fight" was used for promotional material such as the aforementioned special and the teaser trailer for the movie that aired on the American network.

On November 13, 2007, the episode was released on the DVD compilation of the same name in the United States and Canada, and on October 27, 2008 in region 2. It also became available in the SpongeBob SquarePants: Season 5, Vol. 2 DVD on November 18, 2008. On September 22, 2009, "Atlantis SquarePantis" was released on the SpongeBob SquarePants: The First 100 Episodes DVD, alongside all the episodes of seasons one through five.

=== Marketing ===
The film begun production in May 2006, and was delivered to Nickelodeon roughly a year later, allowing time for the network's marketers to promote it. A SpongeBob marathon is a key part of the channel's effort to stave off increasing competition from Disney Channel, Cartoon Network and other rivals. Cyma Zarghami, then president of the Nickelodeon networks, said "We do know that kids like events as much as adults do [...] There's a certain amount of water-cooler talk that goes on among kids."

The video game of the same name that was based on the film was released for PlayStation 2, Wii, Game Boy Advance, and Nintendo DS. It was released on November 12, 2007 for Wii, and on October 23 for the PS2, Game Boy Advance, and Nintendo DS. The game was developed by Blitz Games and Altron, and was published by THQ.

== Reception ==
=== Ratings ===
Atlantis SquarePantis was broadcast on November 12, 2007 on Nickelodeon, and was preceded by an "Z-A" countdown of SpongeBob SquarePants episodes picked by viewers. It attracted 9.22 million viewers, the largest audience of a series broadcast at 8:00 p.m. show on November 12, 2007, with the exception of Dancing with the Stars, and currently the highest audience in the series' history.

=== Critical response ===
Happily enough, Lord Royal Highness is voiced by David Bowie, the innovative rock star of yesteryear, and it sounds from his vocal aerobics as if he's having a lot of fun in the role. But the Atlantis adventures of the semi-intrepid little band – searching for and, naturally, destroying the World's Oldest Bubble – are tired. Perhaps the writers and producers imagined they were cleverly spoofing traditional children's stories about magical kingdoms, but SquarePantis seems to be playing it unimaginatively straight. And flat.

— Tom Shales, The Washington Post.

Ian Jane of DVD Talk said "[the season five DVD] is a fun selection of solid episodes and [the film] is excellent [...] Paramount has done a nice job on this release and SpongeBob SquarePants: Atlantis SquarePantis comes recommended."

In her review for About.com, Nancy Basile's review was mixed and gave it a score of 2.5 out of 5. She wrote "Kids will enjoy this, but adults, who love the crazy antics, tongue-in-cheek humor and naive blunderings of early SpongeBob will be disappointed." Jerry Vonkramer of ToonZone gave the episode a score of 7/10 and wrote "Atlantis SquarePants [sic] is not a masterpiece, but neither does it deserve the awful reputation it seems to have."

Tom Shales, a television critic of The Washington Post, lambasted the film in a November 11, 2007 review. In his review, Shales wrote that "the funniest thing about the film is its title" and "a typical episode has about as many laughs as this inflated version does." Shales also criticized the musical numbers in Atlantis SquarePantis, calling them "numbing." He concluded the review saying that the special was "flat" and "unimpressive".
