= Pest of the West =

- SpongeBob SquarePants episode
- SpongeBuck SquarePants is cheered by Western ancestors of Mr. Krabs, Squidward, Patrick Star, and Mrs. Puff.
- Episode no.: Season 5 Episode 16
- Directed by: Andrew Overtoom (animation); Tom Yasumi (animation); Luke Brookshier (storyboard); Tom King (storyboard); Alan Smart (supervising)
- Written by: Luke Brookshier; Tom King; Steven Banks; Richard Pursel
- Production code: 151-526/151-527
- Original air date: April 11, 2008

Episode chronology
← Previous "To Save a Squirrel"	Next → "20,000 Patties Under the Sea"
- SpongeBob SquarePants (season 5)

"Pest of the West" is the 16th episode of the fifth season and the 96th overall episode of the American animated television series SpongeBob SquarePants. In this episode, SpongeBob finds that he is a distant relative of SpongeBuck SquarePants, a sheriff from Bikini Bottom's past town who helped save the citizens from the quickest whip draw in town, the evil Dead Eye Plankton. It was written by Luke Brookshier, Tom King, Steven Banks and Richard Pursel, with Andrew Overtoom and Tom Yasumi serving as animation directors. Brookshier and King also functioned as storyboard directors.

Pest of the West originally aired on Nickelodeon in the United States on April 11, 2008, and became available on DVD four days later. It included the song "Idiot Friends," written by Tom Kenny and Andy Paley, which was later released on the album called SpongeBob's Greatest Hits in 2009. Upon release, the episode garnered a total of 6.1 million viewers, and was met with positive reviews from media critics.

== Plot summary ==
At the Krusty Krab, SpongeBob discovers that his friend Patrick Star had a famous relative named Patrick Revere, who warned Bikini Bottom of vicious man-eating mollusks during the 17th century. Later, Mr. Krabs reveals that he also had a famous relative—his great-great-grandpappy Krabs, who invented "The Spendthrift Bill Fold System", a booby trap that baits its victims with a dollar bill. Disappointed that he lacks a famous relative, SpongeBob walks into the park where he observes a statue covered in poop and runs into Sandy, who reveals that her great-aunt named Rosie Cheeks was the first squirrel to discover oil in Texas. Feeling sorry for SpongeBob, Sandy takes him to a library. SpongeBob learns that he is the great-great-great-grandson of a Western hero called SpongeBuck SquarePants. Sandy begins to tell SpongeBob the story of SpongeBuck.

In the story, SpongeBuck SquarePants takes a train to a town named Dead Eye Gulch. He goes to The Dead Eye Funeral and Ice Cream Parlor, and later to a western saloon called the Krusty Kantina. There he meets William Krabs (Mr. Krabs' ancestor), Hopalong Tentacles (Squidward's ancestor) and Polene Puff (Mrs. Puff's ancestor). SpongeBuck is mistakenly made the sheriff, learning that the previous sheriff had died. Later, Pecos Patrick Star (Patrick's ancestor), arrives and warns everybody that the town's villain, Dead Eye Plankton will arrive and sing a song called "Dead Eye". Dead Eye Plankton then arrives and challenges SpongeBuck to a duel at high noon. SpongeBuck gets kicked away to a desert, where he meets Pecos Patrick Star. Pecos tells SpongeBuck that he must smack Dead Eye Plankton several times to defeat him. When they get back into town, SpongeBuck meets Dead Eye Plankton and the two proceed to have a western duel. SpongeBuck then accidentally steps on Dead Eye, defeating him. The people build a golden statue of SpongeBuck to show their gratitude. SpongeBuck says that if he ever has a great-great-great-great-great-grandson, he wants him to say he was proud of his grandfather.

After hearing the story, the two friends go back to the park. SpongeBob realizes that the statue is covered in jellyfish feces and cleans it, which is actually a statue of SpongeBuck. The episode concludes with SpongeBob saying that someday people will know the name SpongeBob SquarePants, unaware of the fact that the jellyfish have returned.

== Production ==
"Pest of the West" was a special episode written by Luke Brookshier, Tom King, Steven Banks and Richard Pursel, with Andrew Overtoom and Tom Yasumi serving as animation directors. Brookshier and King also functioned as storyboard directors. Brown Johnson, president of animation for Nickelodeon and MTVN Kids and Family Group, said, "SpongeBob consistently finds new ways to delight our audience [...], and this special is just another example of how the creative team can put SpongeBob in any setting and deliver funny unforgettable classic moments."

To promote the episode, Nickelodeon released short-form videos of the special including a two-minute preview clip, song clips and an instant replay of the special following its premiere on TurboNick, the network's broadband video service on Nick.com. Following its premiere, "Pest of the West" was streamed on video on demand and became available for purchase through downloads on various Nickelodeon partner video distribution platforms. Nickelodeon also launched an online page for the episode located on "www.nick.com/pest", where it featured a new game of the week, and a "name generator".

"Pest of the West" is the first episode in the series that the crew used Wacom Cintiqs for the drawings, instead of pencils. Series background designer Kenny Pittenger said that "the only real difference between the way we draw now and the way we drew then is that we abandoned pencil and paper during the fifth season." The crew began the shift while they were working on the episode. Pittenger said that "it was while we were working on 'Pest of the West', one of the half-hour specials, that we made the switch… did you notice?" The shift to Wacom Cintiqs let the designers and animators draw on the computer screen and make immediate changes or undo mistakes. Pittenger said "Many neo-Luddites—er… I mean, many of my cohorts—don't like working on them, but I find them useful. There's no substitute for the immediacy of drawing on a piece of paper, of course, but digital nautical nonsense is still pretty fun."

The song featured in the episode's epilogue, "Idiot Friends", was written by Tom Kenny, SpongeBob's voice actor, and Andy Paley. In 2009, the song was released on the album called SpongeBob's Greatest Hits, alongside 16 other tracks.

== Cultural references ==
"Pest of the West" features cultural references from various Western films. Aspects of the musical cues used in the high noon duel between SpongeBuck and Dead Eye Plankton was from Sergio Leone's 1968 Spaghetti Western film Once Upon a Time in the West, complete with Ennio Morricone's harmonica riff used for the Charles Bronson character.

== Reception ==
"For a SpongeBob SquarePants special, it delivered what the audience expected... sight gags, humorous dialogue, and laughs. I have to say, I appreciated how 'going back in time' was accomplished in this special. It played a lot better for me than the medieval times special ['Dunces and Dragons'] (where SpongeBob and Patrick went back in time to the medieval period, but it was never known whether they actually went back in time or it was all a dream). Here, I liked the fact that we went from SpongeBob and Sandy reading the book, to seeing what happened in the past, with Sponge Buck and the ancestors. Going into this, I was almost afraid that the writers would find a way, either for real or through a dream, to actually send SpongeBob back to the Wild West."

— Lesley Aeschliman in her review for Yahoo! Voices

"Pest of the West" first aired with a TV-Y7 parental rating. The premiere marked the fourth Nickelodeon telecast in 2008 to move to the top of basic cable among total viewers, as well as handily ranking as number-one on broadcast and cable television among kids 2–11, 6-11 and teens 9–14. A total of 6.1 million viewers tuned into the half-hour "Pest of the West" special.

The episode received positive reviews from media critics and fans. Paul Mavis of the DVD Talk said the episode is "a real treat for fans of westerns and spaghetti westerns" because "the writers play off time-honored genre clichés so well." Mavis lauded Plankton's appearance in the episode, saying "Plankton reaches insane levels of hilarity here, brandishing a whip like Lash LaRue and cracking it at the 'hayseeds' that get in his way." He also praised Plankton's voice actor, Mr. Lawrence, on his role, writing "It's a terrific vocal performance by [Mr.] Doug Lawrence (made even more funny during the town's ritualized squashing of villain Dead-Eye, as he screams grotesquely off-camera)."

Lesley Aeschliman of Yahoo! Voices praised the "going back in time" element of the episode, comparing it to "Dunces and Dragons". Russ Evenhuis of Blogcritics was positive towards the DVD, saying "You won't be disappointed."

== Merchandising ==
"Pest of the West" was released on a DVD compilation of the same name on April 25, 2008, by Nickelodeon and Paramount Home Entertainment. The DVD includes the episode itself, "The Krusty Plate", "Pat No Pay", "The Inmates of Summer", "To Save a Squirrel", "20,000 Patties Under the Sea" and "The Battle of Bikini Bottom." Bonus features include a "Pest of the West" original animatic and four "Pest of the West" shorts. It also became available in the SpongeBob SquarePants: Season 5, Vol. 2 DVD on November 18, 2008. On September 22, 2009, "Pest of the West" was released on the SpongeBob SquarePants: The First 100 Episodes DVD, alongside all the episodes of seasons one through five.

In 2013, Nickelodeon released a tie-in book based on the episode called Pest of the West. The book was illustrated by Caleb Meurer, published by Random House, and was released on January 8.
