= SpongeBob SquarePants season 5 =

Season of television series

SpongeBob SquarePants
- Season 5
- DVD cover
- Showrunner: Paul Tibbitt
- Starring: Tom Kenny; Bill Fagerbakke; Rodger Bumpass; Clancy Brown; Mr. Lawrence; Jill Talley; Carolyn Lawrence; Mary Jo Catlett; Lori Alan
- No. of episodes: 20 (41 segments)

Release
- Original network: Nickelodeon
- Original release: February 19, 2007 – July 19, 2009

Season chronology
- ← Previous; Season 4 Next → Season 6

The fifth season of the American animated television series SpongeBob SquarePants, created by former marine biologist and animator Stephen Hillenburg, aired on Nickelodeon from February 19, 2007, to July 19, 2009, and contained 20 half-hour episodes. The series chronicles the exploits and adventures of the title character and his various friends in the fictional underwater city of Bikini Bottom. The season was executive produced by series creator Hillenburg and writer Paul Tibbitt, who also acted as the showrunner.

The season received high acclaim from media critics and fans. The show itself received several recognition, including the Kids' Choice Awards for Favorite Cartoon in 2007. At the 60th Primetime Emmy Awards, the episodes "The Inmates of Summer" and "The Two Faces of Squidward" were nominated for Outstanding Animated Program (for Programming Less Than One Hour), but lost to The Simpsons episode "Eternal Moonshine of the Simpson Mind". The show won the 2007 BAFTA Children's Awards for the International category. Tom Kenny was nominated at the 35th Annie Awards for Best Voice Acting in an Animated Television Production for his role as SpongeBob SquarePants in the episode "Spy Buddies".

Several compilation DVDs that contained episodes from the season were released. The SpongeBob SquarePants: Season 5, Volume 1 and 2 DVDs were released in Region 1 on September 4, 2007, and November 18, 2008, respectively, while the complete season set was released in Region 2 on November 3, 2008, and Region 4 on November 7, 2008. The first volume was released before the episode "Fungus Among Us" aired in the United States; the second volume was released before the episode "Goo Goo Gas" aired. On November 13, 2012, The Complete Fifth Season DVD was released in Region 1.

== Production ==
The season's executive producers were series creator Stephen Hillenburg and Paul Tibbitt, who also acted as the series' showrunner. While most episodes consisted of two shorts that were about eleven minutes long or specials that lasted the whole episode, certain episodes were made of one full eleven-minute episode, and two shorts, one of which was seven minutes long and the other only four minutes long. The animation was handled overseas in South Korea at Rough Draft Studios. Throughout the series run, from 1999 to 2008, SpongeBob SquarePants was drawn and animated using pencils. In 2008, the crew shifted and used Wacom Cintiqs for the drawings, instead of pencils. The episode "Pest of the West" was the first episode in the series that the crew used it. Series background designer Kenny Pittenger said that "the only real difference between the way we draw now and the way we drew then is that we abandoned pencil and paper during the fifth season." The crew began the shift while they were working on the episode. Pittenger said that "it was while we were working on 'Pest of the West', one of the half-hour specials, that we made the switch... did you notice?" The shift to Wacom Cintiqs let the designers and animators draw on computer screen and make immediate changes or undo mistakes. Pittenger said "Many neo-Luddites—er... I mean, many of my cohorts—don't like working on them, but I find them useful. There's no substitute for the immediacy of drawing on a piece of paper, of course, but digital nautical nonsense is still pretty fun."

Animation directors credited with episodes in the fifth season included Larry Leichliter, Andrew Overtoom, Alan Smart, and Tom Yasumi. Episodes were written by a team of writers, which consisted of Casey Alexander, Steven Banks, Charlie Bean, Luke Brookshier, Nate Cash, Zeus Cervas, Tim Hill, Tom King, Dani Michaeli, Greg Miller, Chris Mitchell, Mike Mitchell, Richard Pursel, Chris Reccardi, Eric Shaw, Aaron Springer, and Tuck Tucker. The season was storyboarded by Alexander, Bean, Brookshier, Cash, Cervas, King, Miller, Chris Mitchell, Mike Mitchell, Reccardi, Springer, and Tucker. (Note: Information is taken from the opening credits of each episode.)

== Cast ==
The fifth season featured Tom Kenny as the voice of the title character SpongeBob SquarePants and his pet snail Gary. SpongeBob's best friend, a starfish named Patrick Star, was voiced by Bill Fagerbakke, while Rodger Bumpass played the voice of Squidward Tentacles, an arrogant and ill-tempered octopus. Other members of the cast were Clancy Brown as Mr. Krabs, a miserly crab obsessed with money who is SpongeBob's boss at the Krusty Krab; Mr. Lawrence as Plankton, a small green copepod and Mr. Krabs' business rival; Jill Talley as Karen, Plankton's sentient computer sidekick; Carolyn Lawrence as Sandy Cheeks, a squirrel from Texas; Mary Jo Catlett as Mrs. Puff, SpongeBob's boating school teacher; and Lori Alan as Pearl, a teenage whale who is Mr. Krabs' daughter.

In addition to the regular cast members, episodes feature guest voices from many ranges of professions, including actors, musicians, and artists. In the episode "The Original Fry Cook", American comedian and actor Patton Oswalt guest starred as the voice of Jim, a fry cook who had worked at the Krusty Krab before SpongeBob was hired. Oswalt reflected on his voice-over work for the episode, saying "The best part was that I sat next to Clancy Brown in the studio. I'm a big Highlander fan, so to see him do Mr. Krabs was really fun." In the episode "Night Light", Ernest Borgnine and Tim Conway returned to reprise their roles as Mermaid Man and Barnacle Boy, respectively. Bob Joles replaced John Rhys Davies as the voice of Man Ray; ironically, they both previously starred in The Jungle Book 2 as the respective voices of Ranjan's father and Bagheera. It was also guest starred by Mark Hamill as the voice of the Moth. Brian Doyle-Murray reprised his role as the Flying Dutchman for "Money Talks". American film and book critic Gene Shalit made a vocal cameo in "The Krusty Sponge" as his "[fish-]likeness", Gene Scallop. In the special episode and television film SpongeBob's Atlantis SquarePantis, English musician and actor David Bowie guest starred as Lord Royal Highness (LRH). Bowie accepted the role when he was persuaded by his 6-year-old daughter, Alexandria Zahra, who is a fan of the show. Bowie wrote in his blog that he "[is] hit the Holy Grail of animation gigs. We, the family, are thrilled. Nothing else need happen this year, well, this week anyway." In "BlackJack", Marion Ross returned to reprise her role as the voice of Grandma SquarePants. The episode was also guest starred by John DiMaggio as BlackJack SquarePants, SpongeBob's cousin. In "The Inmates of Summer", R. Lee Ermey appeared as the Prison Warden. In the entry "20,000 Patties Under the Sea", American musician and Kiss vocalist Gene Simmons guest starred as the Sea Monster, while his wife, Shannon Tweed, voiced the Mother. Ray Liotta guest starred in the episode "WhoBob WhatPants?" as Trevor, the leader of New Kelp City's Bubble Poppin Boys gang, and the main villain in the episode. In "Banned in Bikini Bottom", Andrea Martin voiced the character of Ms. Gristlepuss. English-American actor and director Christopher Guest voiced Stanley S. SquarePants, SpongeBob's cousin, in the episode of the same name.

== Reception ==
In 2008, Tom Kenny was nominated at the 35th Annie Awards for Best Voice Acting in an Animated Television Production for his role as SpongeBob SquarePants in the episode "Spy Buddies". At the 60th Primetime Emmy Awards, the episode "The Inmates of Summer"/"The Two Faces of Squidward" was nominated for Outstanding Animated Program (for Programming Less Than One Hour), but lost to The Simpsons episode "Eternal Moonshine of the Simpson Mind". At the BAFTA Children's Awards, the show won the International category. At the 2008 Golden Reel Awards, the episode "SpongeHenge" won the Best Sound Editing in Television: Animated category. The show itself received several recognition, including the Kids' Choice Awards for Favorite Cartoon in 2009 and 2010. The series was nominated for the award in 2008, but lost to Avatar: The Last Airbender. The series also won the same category at the Philippines Kids' Choice Awards and Indonesia Kids' Choice Awards, held in 2008 and 2009, respectively. At the 2009 ASTRA Awards, the show was nominated for the Favourite International Program category. Furthermore, the show won the Choice TV Animated Show category at the 2009 Teen Choice Awards.

The season received largely positive reviews from media critics and fans. In his review for DVD Talk, Paul Mavis "highly recommended" the Volume 1 season set, saying "[This] is another winner from Nickelodeon DVD, and a must-have for parents who can't get enough of the braying little yellow sponge. Oh yeah; the kids will probably like it, too." Mavis also praised the voice actors who contributed on the show, and wrote "As funny as the stories are, and in this collection, there are some real gems, I can't stress enough the importance of those voice talents in conveying the unhinged, manic quality that is so integral to the success of SpongeBob SquarePants. In a separate review for the Volume 2 DVD, Mavis only "recommended" the set and wrote "SpongeBob may, and I repeat, 'may,' be starting to level off." He particularly criticized the later entries as "indication of that potential trend."

Roy Hrab of DVD Verdict was positive on the season, but wrote "I do not think that adults will be as entertained as in previous seasons. The comedy is more targeted at the kids than in the past." In particular, Hrab cited the episode "Rise and Shine" as "tiresome (for adults, anyway; kids will enjoy it)." In conclusion, he said "there's nothing new here and adults will be disappointed, but the latest installment of SpongeBob SquarePants delivers a lot of silly and good-natured fun for the kids and there's nothing wrong with that." In the Volume 2 review also for the DVD Verdict, Dennis Prince said "[The season] is not the series' best work but, nevertheless, is an improvement". He added "[It] delivers more of what SpongeBob fans crave."

== Episodes ==
The episodes are ordered below according to Nickelodeon's packaging order, and not their original production or broadcast order.

No. overall	No. in season	Title	Animation direction by	Written by	Original release date	Prod. code	U.S. viewers (millions)
81	1	"Friend or Foe"	Alan Smart and Tom Yasumi	Written by : Casey Alexander, Zeus Cervas, Mike Mitchell, Steven Banks, and Tim Hill; Storyboarded by : Casey Alexander, Zeus Cervas, and Mike Mitchell (directors)	April 13, 2007	151–501	5.91
81	1	"Friend or Foe"	Alan Smart and Tom Yasumi	Written by : Casey Alexander, Zeus Cervas, Mike Mitchell, Steven Banks, and Tim Hill; Storyboarded by : Casey Alexander, Zeus Cervas, and Mike Mitchell (directors)	April 13, 2007	151–502	5.91
Mr. Krabs and Plankton have been rivals for a long time. However, one day, Mr. Krabs reveals to SpongeBob that they were actually best friends during their childhood. Through a series of flashbacks, Mr. Krabs explains the story of how that friendship deteriorated, the cause of their rivalry, how Mr. Krabs became obsessive with money, how Plankton became evil, and how the Krabby Patty was created in the process.
82	2	"The Original Fry Cook"	Andrew Overtoom	Written by : Luke Brookshier, Tom King, Steven Banks, and Dani Michaeli; Storyboarded by : Luke Brookshier and Tom King (directors)	July 30, 2007 (Note: This episode was first released on the Friend or Foe? DVD on April 17, 2007.)	151–503	2.85
82	2	"Night Light"	Andrew Overtoom	Written by : Casey Alexander, Chris Mitchell, and Steven Banks; Storyboarded by : Casey Alexander and Chris Mitchell (directors)	July 30, 2007	5574–435	2.85
"The Original Fry Cook": Jim, Mr. Krab's old fry cook, pays a special visit to the Krusty Krab. SpongeBob is astonished by his predecessor, who has since become a famous chef following his resignation from the restaurant. He is welcomed to the restaurant which makes SpongeBob feel unneeded and rejected. SpongeBob decides to quit, but Jim tells him that he is not at the Krusty Krab to take over his job. Jim further believes SpongeBob could be a greater fry cook, only if he leaves the restaurant. "Night Light": After reading a horror book, SpongeBob becomes nyctophobic. When at the Krusty Krab, Mr. Krabs suggests SpongeBob to buy a nightlight, so he will have comfort or convenience in dark. However, SpongeBob invests in as many nightlights as his pineapple house can fit, and even tags with Patrick for a sleepover that is guaranteed to keep the creatures of the dark away. While he and Patrick gather more "night lights," they accidentally summon Mermaid Man and Barnacle Boy, and soon the Moth, one of Mermaid Man's old enemies, shows up too.
83	3	"Rise and Shine"	Andrew Overtoom	Written by : Nate Cash and Steven Banks; Storyboarded by : Nate Cash (director)	February 19, 2007	151–504–4	5.34
83	3	"Waiting"	Alan Smart	Written by : Nate Cash, Tuck Tucker, and Steven Banks; Storyboarded by : Nate Cash and Tuck Tucker (directors)	February 19, 2007	151–504–7	5.34
83	3	"Fungus Among Us"	Tom Yasumi	Written by : Casey Alexander, Zeus Cervas, and Richard Pursel; Storyboarded by : Casey Alexander and Zeus Cervas (directors)	September 29, 2007	151–505	2.26
"Rise and Shine": Patrick goes through his morning routine. "Waiting": SpongeBob discovers and responds to an offer in his breakfast cereal for a free toy. He starts waiting for the toy to arrive, so he sets up right next to his mailbox, determined to be present when the mailman arrives. When the toy arrives, Patrick "breaks" it, leaving SpongeBob devastated. However, Squidward shows him that it is supposed to spring off, and reattaches it. "Fungus Among Us": SpongeBob becomes infected by an itch-causing fungus. When at the Krusty Krab, his disease gets on the Krabby Patties and fries, including all of the customers and Squidward. Eventually, Gary arrives and saves everyone by licking the contagious fungus off.
84	4	"Spy Buddies"	Andrew Overtoom	Written by : Luke Brookshier, Tom King, and Dani Michaeli; Storyboarded by : Luke Brookshier and Tom King (directors)	July 23, 2007 (Note: "Spy Buddies" was first released on the Friend or Foe? DVD on April 17, 2007.) (Note: "Boat Smarts" and "Good Ol ' Whatshisname" was first released on the Bikini Bottom Adventures DVD on June 5, 2007.)	151–506	4.93
84	4	"Boat Smarts"	Alan Smart	Written by : Casey Alexander, Zeus Cervas, and Richard Pursel; Storyboarded by : Casey Alexander and Zeus Cervas (directors)	July 23, 2007	151–508–4	4.93
84	4	"Good Ol' Whatshisname"	Alan Smart	Written by : Casey Alexander, Zeus Cervas, and Dani Michaeli (TV), Richard Pursel (DVD); Storyboarded by : Casey Alexander and Zeus Cervas (directors)	July 23, 2007	151–508–7	4.93
"Spy Buddies": Mr. Krabs enlists SpongeBob and Patrick to spy on Plankton. The pair visit Sandy for advice, who gives them a pair of laser pants. They start following Plankton and end up at the Chum Bucket, with Plankton thinking that they came to eat. While waiting for Plankton, Patrick tells SpongeBob that his laser pants are malfunctioning. As he continues trying to control them, the laser shoots out and destroys the Chum Bucket. Plankton becomes angry and attempts to destroy the Krusty Krab for revenge. However, Plankton is revealed to be Mr. Krabs, who entered into a bet with the real Plankton (who created a robot Mr. Krabs to replace the real him) to prove that if he were Plankton, he could not only steal the Krabby Patty recipe, but also succeed in his first try. "Boat Smarts": Mrs. Puff presents a film on good and bad boat drivers, sponsored by COBBUTKSBSPOTRAOOBAT (Citizens of Bikini Bottom United To Keep SpongeBob SquarePants Off The Road And Out Of Boats All Together). "Good Ol' Whatshisname": Mr. Krabs organizes a work contest for SpongeBob and Squidward that involves naming all the customers at the Krusty Krab. He shows them a brochure for a cruise vacation as a prize; Squidward becomes very determined to win the cruise prize at any costs. After efforts from his two employees, Mr. Krabs did not tally the scores, but tells them that to know the last customer's name will decide who will win. Squidward then asks the fish his name but the fish has a ridiculous name that sounds alike to "What's it to ya?" Squidward steals the customer's wallet to look at the driver's license. Squidward gets arrested and sentenced to exactly 10 years in prison. In jail, he excitedly gets the prize from Mr. Krabs, only to find, to his dismay, that the cruise that the brochure offers has long been expired, and that the prize is just the brochure.
85	5	"New Digs"	Andrew Overtoom	Written by : Nate Cash, Tuck Tucker, and Richard Pursel; Storyboarded by : Nate Cash and Tuck Tucker (directors)	July 25, 2007 (Note: This episode was first released on the Bikini Bottom Adventures DVD on June 5, 2007.)	151–510	3.90
85	5	"Krabs à la Mode"	Tom Yasumi	Written by : Luke Brookshier, Tom King, and Eric Shaw; Storyboarded by : Luke Brookshier and Tom King (directors)	July 25, 2007	151–509	3.90
"New Digs": After being late to work, SpongeBob decides to move into the Krusty Krab. At the end, Squidward moved in to the Krusty Krab. "Krabs à la Mode": Plankton alters the Krusty Krab's thermostat as part of another Krabby Patty stealing scheme. It backfires on him when Mr. Krabs turns the Krusty Krab into a skating rink and a frozen wasteland with ice chunks. Plankton goes in and attempts to steal a patty himself but gets pummeled. He freezes the customers, but Mr. Krabs stops him and sets the thermostat to freezing when Plankton falls into the water, turning him into an ice cube. The Krusty Krab is turned into a popular public pool the following summer.
86	6	"Roller Cowards"	Alan Smart	Written by : Luke Brookshier, Tom King, and Steven Banks; Storyboarded by : Luke Brookshier and Tom King (directors)	July 27, 2007	151–512	3.03
86	6	"Bucket Sweet Bucket"	Larry Leichliter	Written by : Casey Alexander, Zeus Cervas, and Richard Pursel; Storyboarded by : Casey Alexander and Zeus Cervas (directors)	July 27, 2007	151–511	3.03
"Roller Cowards": SpongeBob and Patrick are determined to ride a new roller coaster at Glove World, called, "The Fiery Fist o' Pain". However, the more they think about the extreme coaster, the more they get scared, so both of them find ways to stall themselves from riding it. After learning that Glove World will close in five minutes, they decide to ride the roller coaster and become strong to face their fears. "Bucket Sweet Bucket": Plankton tricks SpongeBob, Patrick, and Squidward to help him redecorate the Chum Bucket. Plankton sees this as an opportunity to purloin the Krabby Patty formula, as Mr. Krabs is on vacation. The two remodel the Chum Bucket by dismantling the Krusty Krab, while Plankton fails to retrieve the formula in the process. Mr. Krabs arrives and moves the now Krusty Krab-like Chum Bucket to his place, deserting Plankton.
87	7	"To Love a Patty"	Andrew Overtoom	Written by : Casey Alexander, Zeus Cervas, and Eric Shaw; Storyboarded by : Casey Alexander and Zeus Cervas (directors)	July 26, 2007 (Note: "Breath of Fresh Squidward" was first released on the Bikini Bottom Adventures DVD on June 5, 2007.)	151–514	3.68
87	7	"Breath of Fresh Squidward"	Tom Yasumi	Written by : Nate Cash, Tuck Tucker, and Richard Pursel; Storyboarded by : Nate Cash and Tuck Tucker (directors)	July 26, 2007	151–513	3.68
"To Love a Patty": SpongeBob falls in love with a patty. After some time, the patty has spoiled. Oblivious to this, SpongeBob decides to take it on a date. When at the Krusty Krab, SpongeBob still thinks the sandwich is beautiful until he smells it, then sees the hideous appearance of the expired patty. Mr. Krabs tells SpongeBob that Krabby Patties are meant to be loved and eaten. SpongeBob then eats the spoiled Krabby Patty, feeling nauseous afterward. "Breath of Fresh Squidward": Squidward gets accidentally electrocuted by his own electric fence, causing a complete change in his personality. He becomes cheerful and friendly to everyone in town and SpongeBob thinks that he is replaced as fry cook. SpongeBob's behavior towards Squidward changes over jealousy, making Squidward feel saddened. SpongeBob goes to his house to apologize, but becomes ill-tempered after slapping Squidward, who is suffering again from electrocution upon entering his house. After Patrick joins in SpongeBob and Squidward's electrocution, the generator for the electric fence blows out and SpongeBob and Patrick's personalities shift to Squidward's grumpy personality.
88	8	"Money Talks"	Alan Smart	Written by : Luke Brookshier, Tom King, and Dani Michaeli; Storyboarded by : Luke Brookshier & Tom King (directors)	July 31, 2007	151–515–7	3.46
88	8	"SpongeBob vs. The Patty Gadget"	Alan Smart	Written by : Luke Brookshier and Richard Pursel; Storyboarded by : Luke Brookshier (director)	July 31, 2007	151–515–4	3.46
88	8	"Slimy Dancing"	Tom Yasumi	Written by : Nate Cash, Tuck Tucker, and Richard Pursel; Storyboarded by : Nate Cash and Tuck Tucker (directors)	July 31, 2007	151–516	3.46
"Money Talks": Mr. Krabs makes a wish that he could talk to money. When his wish is magically granted by the Flying Dutchman in exchange for his soul, Mr. Krabs becomes restless after learning that they want to be spent. Mr. Krabs starts to regret his deal, and asks the Flying Dutchman for a refund, who refuses. "SpongeBob vs. The Patty Gadget": Patchy tells a story about Squidward inventing a Krabby Patty-making machine to try to make SpongeBob lose his job. SpongeBob will not go down without a fight, so he competes against it. "Slimy Dancing": SpongeBob, Patrick, and Squidward enter a dance contest, but Squidward fails to proceed to the finals, so he decides to coach for SpongeBob to win the trophy. At the night of the competition, they win the contest. However, they get disqualified when SpongeBob reveals that he has a partner, which is Squidward. The trophy is confiscated, and it turns out that all the contestants are partnered. The only individual dancer in the contest is Patrick, making him win the trophy.
89	9	"The Krusty Sponge"	Andrew Overtoom	Written by : Aaron Springer and Eric Shaw; Storyboarded by : Aaron Springer (director)	July 24, 2007	151–519	3.91
89	9	"Sing a Song of Patrick"	Alan Smart	Written by : Luke Brookshier, Tom King, and Steven Banks; Storyboarded by : Luke Brookshier and Tom King (directors)	February 19, 2007	151–520	5.34
"The Krusty Sponge": After a food critic raves about SpongeBob's cooking, Mr. Krabs makes him the focal point of the Krusty Krab restaurant. The next day, Mr. Krabs begins selling yellow patties (tainted meat), replacing the Krabby Patty sandwiches. The new brand makes the customers sick, and Mr. Krabs is ordered to the court. The Krusty Krab changes back to normal after Mr. Krabs takes the judge, who is a huge fan of SpongeBob, to his restaurant. "Sing a Song of Patrick": Patrick writes an annoying song. SpongeBob, however, tells Patrick that the song is great, so they try to get the song played on the radio. The local radio station rejects them, but they manage to play the song after putting the record player on top of the station's antenna. The song is heard throughout the town, which causes chaos. An angry mob forms and starts to chase the two.
90	10	"A Flea in Her Dome"	Andrew Overtoom	Written by : Casey Alexander, Zeus Cervas, and Steven Banks; Storyboarded by : Casey Alexander and Zeus Cervas (directors)	August 1, 2007	151–522	2.77
90	10	"The Donut of Shame"	Tom Yasumi	Written by : Nate Cash and Dani Michaeli; Storyboarded by : Nate Cash (director)	August 1, 2007	151–521–7	2.77
90	10	"The Krusty Plate"	Tom Yasumi	Written by : Tuck Tucker and Eric Shaw; Storyboarded by : Tuck Tucker (director)	August 1, 2007	151–521–4	2.77
"A Flea in Her Dome": SpongeBob and Patrick organize a party in the treedome to welcome Sandy, who is returning from Texas. However, unknown to her, Sandy has carried fleas. The fleas take over the treedome, until Sandy gets an idea that would rid of the fleas. She opens the door, letting saltwater get inside. "The Donut of Shame": After waking up with a hangover from a party last night, Patrick accidentally takes SpongeBob's donut. He is wracked with guilt over his action. SpongeBob arrives to watch a videotape of the party and it is revealed that the donut is a birthday present for Patrick. Patrick shares his donut to SpongeBob. "The Krusty Plate": During an evening of washing dishes at the Krusty Krab, SpongeBob cannot remove a spot from a dinner plate. He attempts to use various methods, to the point of destroying the restaurant. In the end, SpongeBob succeeds to clean the plate, but destroys the Krusty Krab in the process from a nuclear explosion.
91	11	"Goo Goo Gas"	Alan Smart	Written by : Luke Brookshier, Tom King, and Dani Michaeli; Storyboarded by : Luke Brookshier and Tom King (directors)	July 19, 2009 (Note: This episode was first released on the SpongeBob's WhoBob WhatPants? DVD on October 14, 2008.)	151–523	4.85
91	11	"Le Big Switch"	Tom Yasumi	Written by : Nate Cash, Tuck Tucker, and Richard Pursel; Storyboarded by : Nate Cash and Tuck Tucker (directors)	September 29, 2007	151–524	2.26
"Goo Goo Gas": Plankton's latest scheme sees him invent a gas that causes people to turn into babies. Plankton hijacks the Krusty Krab and turns all the customers into babies. Plankton then gets the secret formula, but SpongeBob accidentally overpowers the gas canister by bashing it, causing it to explode. The gas turns Plankton into a microscopic baby. "Le Big Switch": SpongeBob and an executive chef trade jobs in a cultural exchange program. SpongeBob does not start out well at the new restaurant as the owner demands him to cook food other than Krabby Patties. The owner continues to yell at him until he tastes a patty, realizing how good it tastes. The owner begins to sell Krabby Patties, which all the rich clientele enjoy. The exchange program ends and SpongeBob is eager to return to the Krusty Krab. SpongeBob takes the Krabby Patties back and all the customers follow him.
92 (Note: Alternatively listed under the syndication number #998.)	12	"Atlantis SquarePantis"	Andrew Overtoom	Written by : Casey Alexander, Zeus Cervas, Steven Banks, and Dani Michaeli; Storyboarded by : Casey Alexander and Zeus Cervas (directors)	November 12, 2007 (Without Patchy Segments); November 23, 2007 (With Patchy Segments)	151–517	8.76
92	12	"Atlantis SquarePantis"	Andrew Overtoom	Written by : Casey Alexander, Zeus Cervas, Steven Banks, and Dani Michaeli; Storyboarded by : Casey Alexander and Zeus Cervas (directors)	November 12, 2007 (Without Patchy Segments); November 23, 2007 (With Patchy Segments)	151–518	8.76
SpongeBob and his friends visit Atlantis by traveling there through a song-powered bus. Several attractions at Atlantis have charms to each of the group, including Sandy, Mr. Krabs, Squidward, and Plankton, who each sing about the respective charm each attraction has. However, after popping the Oldest Bubble, they are chased by the guards. Plankton appears and is adored by the king, who makes Plankton as the replacement attraction of the bubble. SpongeBob and the gang return to Bikini Bottom.
93	13	"Picture Day"	Alan Smart	Written by : Casey Alexander and Dani Michaeli; Storyboarded by : Casey Alexander (director)	August 2, 2007	151–529–7	3.33
93	13	"Pat No Pay"	Alan Smart	Written by : Zeus Cervas and Dani Michaeli; Storyboarded by : Zeus Cervas (director)	August 2, 2007	151–529–4	3.33
93	13	"BlackJack"	Alan Smart	Written by : Casey Alexander, Zeus Cervas, and Richard Pursel; Storyboarded by : Casey Alexander and Zeus Cervas (directors)	August 2, 2007	151–525	3.33
"Picture Day": It is picture day for Mrs. Puff Boating School Year Book, and SpongeBob has spent all morning getting ready for it. He has to make it to Boating School without getting dirty, but this proves to be more difficult than he imagined. SpongeBob hides in a jelly jar to protect himself from any dirt and grime about to hit him, but Patrick, thinking he's jelly, puts SpongeBob in his peanut butter taco, making him all dirty again. After getting washed off with a hose and having giant dentures put in his mouth, he has finally taken the picture. The episode ends with SpongeBob looking at the yearbook, with every picture in the yearbook smiling the same way as him. "Pat No Pay": When Patrick eats Krabby Patties without paying, Mr. Krabs puts him to work in the restaurant to pay it back. However, he only wreaks havoc, and, in the process, destroys the restaurant. At Mr. Krabs' final task of having Patrick put all the trash bags down the trash shredder, he mistakes Mr. Krabs' money bag for a trash bag and throws that in there. It does not go down due to the compactor being full so Patrick keeps flipping the power switch, causing the Krusty Krab to explode and the money bag to be shredded. "BlackJack": SpongeBob's parents go missing and he suspects that his cousin BlackJack, the family bully who used to torment SpongeBob when he was little, has kidnapped them. SpongeBob goes to BlackJack's house and sees his parents. They explain to SpongeBob that they are throwing a party for BlackJack's return from prison. His cousin arrives, who turns out to be as small as SpongeBob's toe meaning he can't hurt him, and all of them enjoy the party.
94	14	"Blackened Sponge"	Tom Yasumi	Written by : Greg Miller, Aaron Springer, and Eric Shaw; Storyboarded by : Greg Miller and Aaron Springer (directors)	August 3, 2007	151–530	3.28
94	14	"Mermaid Man vs. SpongeBob"	Tom Yasumi	Written by : Nate Cash, Tuck Tucker, and Eric Shaw; Storyboarded by : Nate Cash and Tuck Tucker (directors)	August 3, 2007	151–528	3.28
"Blackened Sponge": While brushing his teeth, SpongeBob accidentally gets a black eye after using a monkey wrench open his toothpaste tube. Too embarrassed to tell anyone the truth behind his injury, SpongeBob lies about a fight with a thug named Jack M. Crazyfish. When at the Krusty Krab, SpongeBob learns Jack M. Crazyfish in his story really exists after it arrives, which makes SpongeBob tell the truth. "Mermaid Man vs. SpongeBob": Plankton turns Mermaid Man and Barnacle Boy into his minions with his mind controlling shampoo. Plankton controls the heroes and orders them to encourage the customers of the Krusty Krab to eat at the Chum Bucket. By feeding them Krabby Patties and fiber to help them digest the Krabby Patties, SpongeBob turns Mermaid Man and Barnacle Boy to normal and they all go to the Krusty Krab, leaving the Chum Bucket empty.
95	15	"The Inmates of Summer"	Alan Smart	Written by : Chris Reccardi, Aaron Springer, and Dani Michaeli; Storyboarded by : Chris Reccardi and Aaron Springer (directors)	November 23, 2007	151–534	4.08
95	15	"To Save a Squirrel"	Alan Smart	Written by : Luke Brookshier, Nate Cash, and Dani Michaeli; Storyboarded by : Luke Brookshier and Nate Cash (directors)	November 23, 2007	151–531	4.26
"The Inmates of Summer": SpongeBob is scheduled to go to summer camp at Sun Fun Island. However, Patrick causes SpongeBob to miss his boat and after inviting Patrick to accompany him, SpongeBob and Patrick accidentally board a ship full of prisoners on their way to jail on Inferno Island; they remain unaware that they are at the wrong camp. At the prison, the drill-sergeant-like warden gets increasingly annoyed by the two actually enjoying the prison camp's activities (solitary confinement for example). Out of boredom, SpongeBob conceives to make a play. The play is shown and the warden likes it, until the prisoners use the boat prop to unsuccessfully escape. As punishment, the Warden sentences the prisoners to camp at Sun Fun Island; which SpongeBob, Patrick, and the prisoners dislike tremendously. "To Save a Squirrel": SpongeBob and Patrick are scared of a cricket and after sneaking into Sandy's camping trip SpongeBob and Patrick are stranded in a cave. SpongeBob and Patrick meet an old man, who convinces each of them to eat his friend. SpongeBob and Patrick then make attempts to eat each other. The old man is impressed, and he then reveals that he is really Sandy, giving the two survivor badges – but it doesn't satisfy a rabid SpongeBob and Patrick.
96	16	"Pest of the West"	Andrew Overtoom and Tom Yasumi	Written by : Luke Brookshier, Tom King, Steven Banks, and Richard Pursel; Storyboarded by : Luke Brookshier and Tom King (directors)	April 11, 2008	151–526	6.14
96	16	"Pest of the West"	Andrew Overtoom and Tom Yasumi	Written by : Luke Brookshier, Tom King, Steven Banks, and Richard Pursel; Storyboarded by : Luke Brookshier and Tom King (directors)	April 11, 2008	151–527	6.14
While researching his family tree, SpongeBob finds that he is a distant relative of SpongeBuck, a sheriff from Bikini Bottom's past who helped save the citizens from the quickest whip draw in town, the evil Dead Eye Plankton.
97	17	"20,000 Patties Under the Sea"	Tom Yasumi	Written by : Chris Reccardi, Aaron Springer, and Richard Pursel; Storyboarded by : Chris Reccardi and Aaron Springer (directors)	November 23, 2007	151–537	4.29
97	17	"The Battle of Bikini Bottom"	Andrew Overtoom	Written by : Luke Brookshier, Nate Cash, and Eric Shaw; Storyboarded by : Luke Brookshier and Nate Cash (directors)	November 23, 2007	151–538	4.26
"20,000 Patties Under the Sea": Mr. Krabs opens a mobile underwater restaurant to compete with Plankton. SpongeBob and Patrick are tasked for the job and are unsuccessful with their first customers. They fall into an abyss and wake a sea monster up. The monster purchases Krabby Patties and Plankton comes along. Plankton is mistaken by the monster for a dessert (a chocolate éclair) and the monster chases him away. "The Battle of Bikini Bottom": When Patrick and SpongeBob discover they have conflicting views on cleanliness, their disagreement blows up into an epic battle. After several attacks to each other, SpongeBob gets dirty, while Patrick ends up clean, and the two end up enjoying their opposite situations they're in, seeing that as an opportunity to get clean and dirty again respectively.
98	18	"What Ever Happened to SpongeBob?" "WhoBob WhatPants?"	Alan Smart and Tom Yasumi	Written by : Casey Alexander, Zeus Cervas, and Steven Banks; Storyboarded by : Casey Alexander and Zeus Cervas (directors)	October 13, 2008	151–535	7.67
98	18	"What Ever Happened to SpongeBob?" "WhoBob WhatPants?"	Alan Smart and Tom Yasumi	Written by : Casey Alexander, Zeus Cervas, and Steven Banks; Storyboarded by : Casey Alexander and Zeus Cervas (directors)	October 13, 2008	151–536	7.67
When SpongeBob tries to spend quality time with his friends, he ends up upsetting them instead, with them calling him "Idiot Boy". Believing his friends don't like him anymore, he has no other choice but to pack and move to another city. In the process, he hits his head, loses all of his memory, and wanders away into a new town.
99	19	"The Two Faces of Squidward"	Tom Yasumi	Written by : Charlie Bean, Aaron Springer, and Steven Banks; Storyboarded by : Charlie Bean and Aaron Springer (directors)	November 23, 2007	151–540	4.08
99	19	"SpongeHenge"	Andrew Overtoom	Written by : Casey Alexander, Zeus Cervas, Richard Pursel; Storyboarded by : Casey Alexander and Zeus Cervas (directors)	November 23, 2007	151–532	4.29
"The Two Faces of Squidward": SpongeBob breaks Squidward's face by accidentally slamming a door into it, and the resulting plastic surgery repair makes Squidward look handsome. His new-found beauty causes everyone in Bikini Bottom to fall in love with him. "SpongeHenge": When a powerful windstorm hits Bikini Bottom, SpongeBob's holes create a jellyfish-enticing sound when the wind blows through them. SpongeBob cannot stand the jellyfish anymore, so he hides in a cave for a long period of time, growing a beard during his stay. After a while, SpongeBob makes several stone replicas of himself to keep himself company. He quickly discovers that the statues can produce better and louder music, to make sure that the jellyfish will leave him alone. He succeeds, so he runs to the Krusty Krab, only to discover that it has long been abandoned. Three thousand years later, "SpongeHenge", the attraction SpongeBob created with his stone replicas, becomes a tourist attraction for the aliens.
100	20	"Banned in Bikini Bottom"	Alan Smart	Written by : Aaron Springer and Steven Banks; Storyboarded by : Aaron Springer (director)	November 23, 2007	151–539	4.26
100	20	"Stanley S. SquarePants"	Andrew Overtoom	Written by : Luke Brookshier, Nate Cash, and Eric Shaw; Storyboarded by : Luke Brookshier and Nate Cash (directors)	November 23, 2007	151–533	4.26
"Banned in Bikini Bottom": SpongeBob loves Krabby Patties so much, he cannot help singing and dancing when he is around the delicious sandwiches. A community headed by Miss Gristlepuss, who is against all things fun and delicious, bans Krabby Patties. Mr. Krabs decides to open a secret Krusty Krab at SpongeBob's pineapple house. Plankton finds out, and calls a cop to shut down Mr. Krabs' operation. Miss Gristlepuss arrives only to close the restaurant and arrest Mr. Krabs and SpongeBob, but she trips and a Krabby Patty is dropped into her mouth, which makes her sing and dance about it and love the sandwich. The Krusty Krab then re-opens. "Stanley S. SquarePants": SpongeBob's accident-prone cousin Stanley comes to visit. Stanley attempts to get a job at the Krusty Krab, with a help from SpongeBob. After, Stanley causes several problems, Mr. Krabs tells him to get a job at the Chum Bucket, with the purpose of destroying it. Plankton hires Stanley and he accidentally destroys the Chum Bucket, much to Mr. Krabs' delight.

== DVD release ==
The first 20 segment episodes of the fifth season were released on DVD by Paramount Home Entertainment in the United States and Canada on September 4, 2007. The "Volume 1" DVD release features bonus material including "Bubble Burst Trivia" for "Friend or Foe" and "The Krusty Sponge". The remaining 21 segment episodes of the season were also released under the title "Volume 2" in the United States and Canada on November 18, 2008. In Region 2 and 4, the DVD release for the season was a complete set. On November 13, 2012, The Complete Fifth Season DVD was released in Region 1, three years after the season had completed broadcast on television.

SpongeBob SquarePants: Season 5, Volume 1
Set details			Special features
20 segment episodes; 2-disc set; 1.33:1 aspect ratio; Languages: English (Dolby Digital 5.1)			Bubble Burst Trivia for "Friend or Foe" and "The Krusty Sponge"; "Friend or Foe" shorts
Release dates			Bubble Burst Trivia for "Friend or Foe" and "The Krusty Sponge"; "Friend or Foe" shorts
Region 1	Region 2	Region 4	Bubble Burst Trivia for "Friend or Foe" and "The Krusty Sponge"; "Friend or Foe" shorts
September 4, 2007	November 16, 2009	December 3, 2009	Bubble Burst Trivia for "Friend or Foe" and "The Krusty Sponge"; "Friend or Foe" shorts

SpongeBob SquarePants: Season 5, Volume 2
Set details			Special features
21 segment episodes; 2-disc set; 1.33:1 aspect ratio; Languages: English (Dolby Digital 5.1)			Karaoke music videos: "Bubble Song"; "Good-Bye Atlantis"; "Dead Eye"; "Together"; "If I Could Talk to Money"
Release dates			Karaoke music videos: "Bubble Song"; "Good-Bye Atlantis"; "Dead Eye"; "Together"; "If I Could Talk to Money"
Region 1	Region 2	Region 4	Karaoke music videos: "Bubble Song"; "Good-Bye Atlantis"; "Dead Eye"; "Together"; "If I Could Talk to Money"
November 18, 2008	November 16, 2009	December 3, 2009	Karaoke music videos: "Bubble Song"; "Good-Bye Atlantis"; "Dead Eye"; "Together"; "If I Could Talk to Money"
