= Yahoo Voices =

Former division of Yahoo! that focused on online publishing

Yahoo! Voices, formerly Associated Content (AC), was a division of Yahoo! that focused on online publishing. Yahoo! Voices distributed a large variety of writing through its website and content partners, including Yahoo! News. In early December 2011, its owners Yahoo! announced a major shakeup involving the introduction of a new service, Yahoo! Voices, which would replace the Associated Content site and take on the bulk of its content, while some 75,000 items would be retired under the new site's more stringent content submission rules. On July 2, 2014, Yahoo! announced that it would be shutting down Yahoo! Voices on July 31, 2014 and the Yahoo! Contributor Network at the end of August 2014.

== History ==
Associated Content was started in January 2005 by Luke Beatty. They hired their CTO in March 2006, Sonu Kansal. It was based in Denver, Colorado, with business development, sales and community offices in New York City.

In April 2009, Associated Content hired a new CEO, Patrick Keane, formerly of CBS Interactive and Google and closed a $6 million Series C round of funding from SoftBank Capital and Canaan Partners. Three weeks after the funding announcement, Associated Content reorganized and laid off 5 employees.

On May 18, 2010, Yahoo! announced that it would purchase Associated Content for $100 million.

On December 1, 2011, Yahoo! announced a new service, Yahoo! Voices, which "replaces Associated Content as Yahoo! Contributor Network's official digital library". In announcing the new service, Yahoo! claimed more stringent submission guidelines would be used in accepting new content and that the company would delete over 75,000 pieces that they deemed to be "inactive and outdated". The new service aimed to provide "more than two million pieces of original content, spanning thousands of different topics, created by more than 500,000 individual experts and enthusiasts".

Yahoo! announced on July 2, 2014 that it would shut down Yahoo! Voices and Yahoo! Contributor Network on July 31, 2014.

The Internet Archive is integrating deleted Yahoo! Voices content into the Wayback Machine.

== Breach ==
In July 2012, Yahoo Voices suffered a major data breach. On July 11, 2012, a hacking group calling itself "D33DS Company" posted a file online containing approximately 450,000 login credentials and passwords from Yahoo Voice users. The data was obtained through a SQL injection attack that exploited vulnerabilities in Yahoo's database servers.

== Publishing platform ==
In addition to text content (articles), AC featured categories for video, audio, and slide shows along with an online community where users shared their expertise, network and voice opinions.

In contrast to many content publishing sites, AC paid many users for content up front. Articles were usually required to be at least 400 words. Pictures were acceptable if from approved sources. The "Assignment Desk" was another source of article ideas and income for writers. AC displayed predefined article titles and users could "claim" the assignment. All on-site assignments (as opposed to "Partner Assignments") paid performance-based revenue while some also offered up-front payment. Content could also be submitted without an up-front payment. All articles written by users who agreed to the contract were eligible to receive payments based on the number of page views.

AC sometimes sent work back to contributors for further editing and sometimes rejected work for violations of the site's terms of use and guidelines, including promotional or advertorial content and plagiarism.

== Motifs ==
Associated Content originally billed itself as "The People's Media Company". The original schema was linked to its idea that its writers (originally called "Content Producers") were "Citizen Journalists".

In early 2009, Associated Content rebranded itself on the site as "Information from the source". Writers on the site, formerly called "Content Producers", were eventually called "Contributors" (after briefly being dubbed "Sources"). The "Citizen Journalist" motif was dropped.

== Criticism ==
Associated Content was criticized for the quality of its content. Slate technical writer Farhad Manjoo summed up this criticism thus: "Associated Content stands as a cautionary tale for anyone looking to do news by the numbers. It is a wasteland of bad writing, uninformed commentary, and the sort of comically dull recitation of the news you'd get from a second grader." Scott Rosenberg criticized Associated Content and other companies for publishing content not aimed at human readers, but for the purpose of influencing search engines, and for actually degrading Google Search results. Independent blogger Lenin Nair also criticized the remuneration policies of Associated Content.

== See also ==
- Content farm
