= List of SpongeBob SquarePants cast members =

Cast members in animated series SpongeBob SquarePants

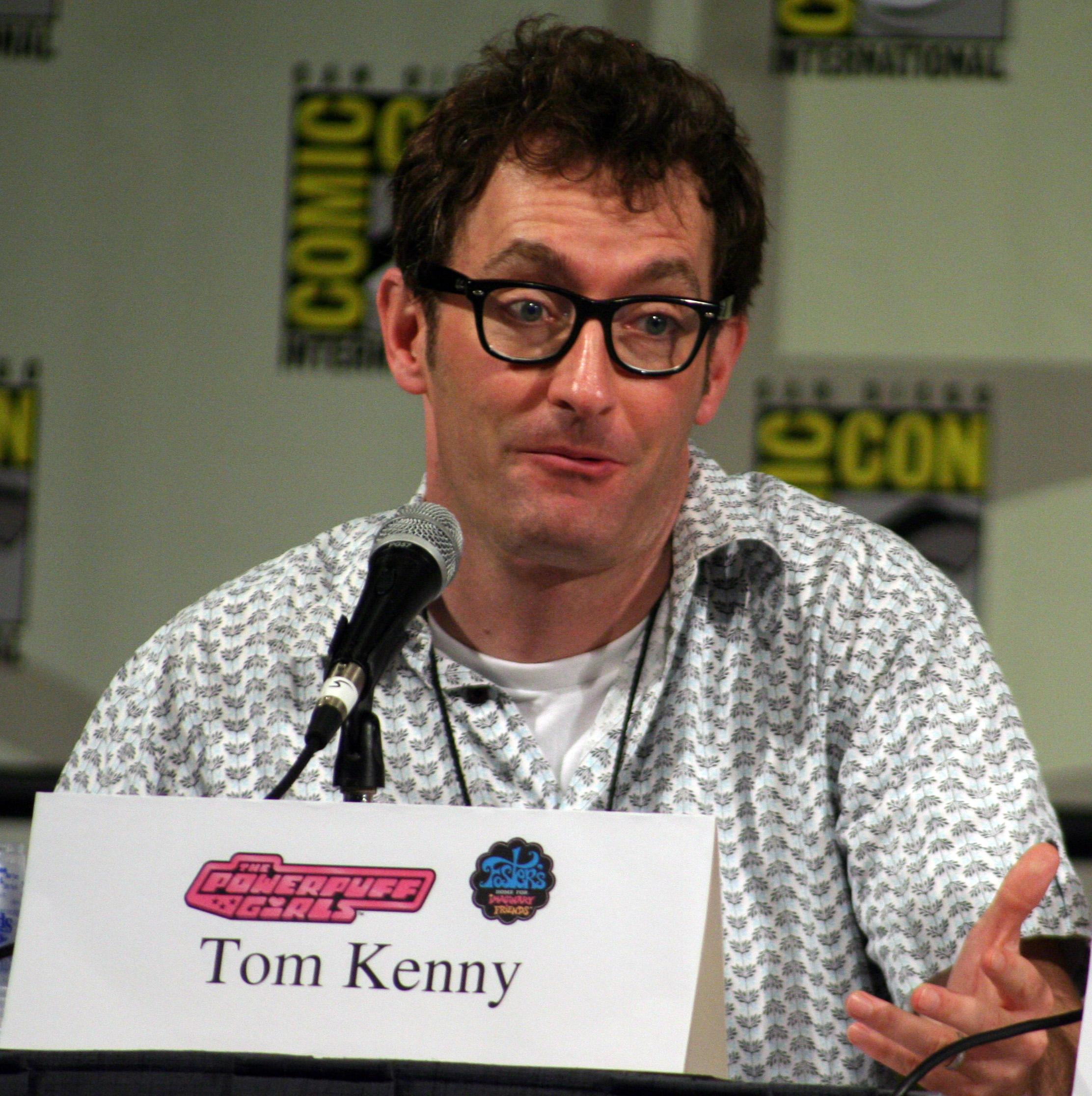
Voice actor Tom Kenny, shown here in 2008, provides the voice of SpongeBob SquarePants, the show's main character.

SpongeBob SquarePants is an American animated television series created by marine biologist and animator Stephen Hillenburg that debuted on Nickelodeon in the United States on May 1, 1999. The regular voice cast consists of Tom Kenny, Bill Fagerbakke, Rodger Bumpass, Clancy Brown, Mr. Lawrence, Jill Talley, Carolyn Lawrence, Mary Jo Catlett and Lori Alan. Most one-off and background characters are voiced by Dee Bradley Baker, Sirena Irwin, Bob Joles, Mark Fite, Thomas F. Wilson and Carlos Alazraqui. Throughout the show's run, it has employed numerous guest stars from many ranges of professions. Repeated guests include Ernest Borgnine, Tim Conway, Brian Doyle-Murray, Marion Ross, John O'Hurley and Michael McKean.

SpongeBob SquarePants chronicles the adventures and endeavors of the title character and his various friends in the fictional underwater city of Bikini Bottom. Many of the ideas for the show originated in an unpublished, educational comic book titled The Intertidal Zone, which Hillenburg created in the mid-1980s. He began developing SpongeBob SquarePants into a television series in 1996 upon the cancellation of Rocko's Modern Life, another Nickelodeon animated series which Hillenburg directed. While creating the show, Hillenburg, with colleague Derek Drymon, was also conducting auditions to find voices for the show's characters. He turned to Kenny, who had worked with him on Rocko's Modern Life, to voice the title character.

The cast members receive residuals every time a new episode they appeared in has aired, which Carolyn Lawrence described as "a very complicated mathematical calculation." Lawrence said in 2008 that it was a "declining scale" and the entertainment industry were "still in negotiations... both sides are still talking." She further stated that "they're still trying to work it out."

Voice of SpongeBob SquarePants
Audio sample of the voice of SpongeBob from the episode "The Secret Box" (2001).

Kenny and Catlett were the first cast members to receive award nominations for their performance on SpongeBob SquarePants. They each received Annie Award nominations in 2001, but did not win. In 2010, Kenny won the Annie Award for Best Voice Acting in a Television Production, making it the first time a cast member had won this type of award. Bumpass was the first cast member to be nominated for an Emmy Award, receiving a nomination in 2012. In 2018, Kenny won both an Annie Award and an Emmy Award for his performance as SpongeBob.

== Regular cast ==
=== Background ===
SpongeBob SquarePants has featured the voices of Tom Kenny, Bill Fagerbakke, Rodger Bumpass, Clancy Brown, Mr. Lawrence, Jill Talley, Carolyn Lawrence, Mary Jo Catlett and Lori Alan since it began. Stephen Hillenburg started developing the SpongeBob concept into a television series in 1996 upon the cancellation of Rocko's Modern Life, which he directed. While creating the show and writing its pilot episode in 1997, he and the show's then-creative director Derek Drymon were also conducting auditions to find voices for the show's characters.

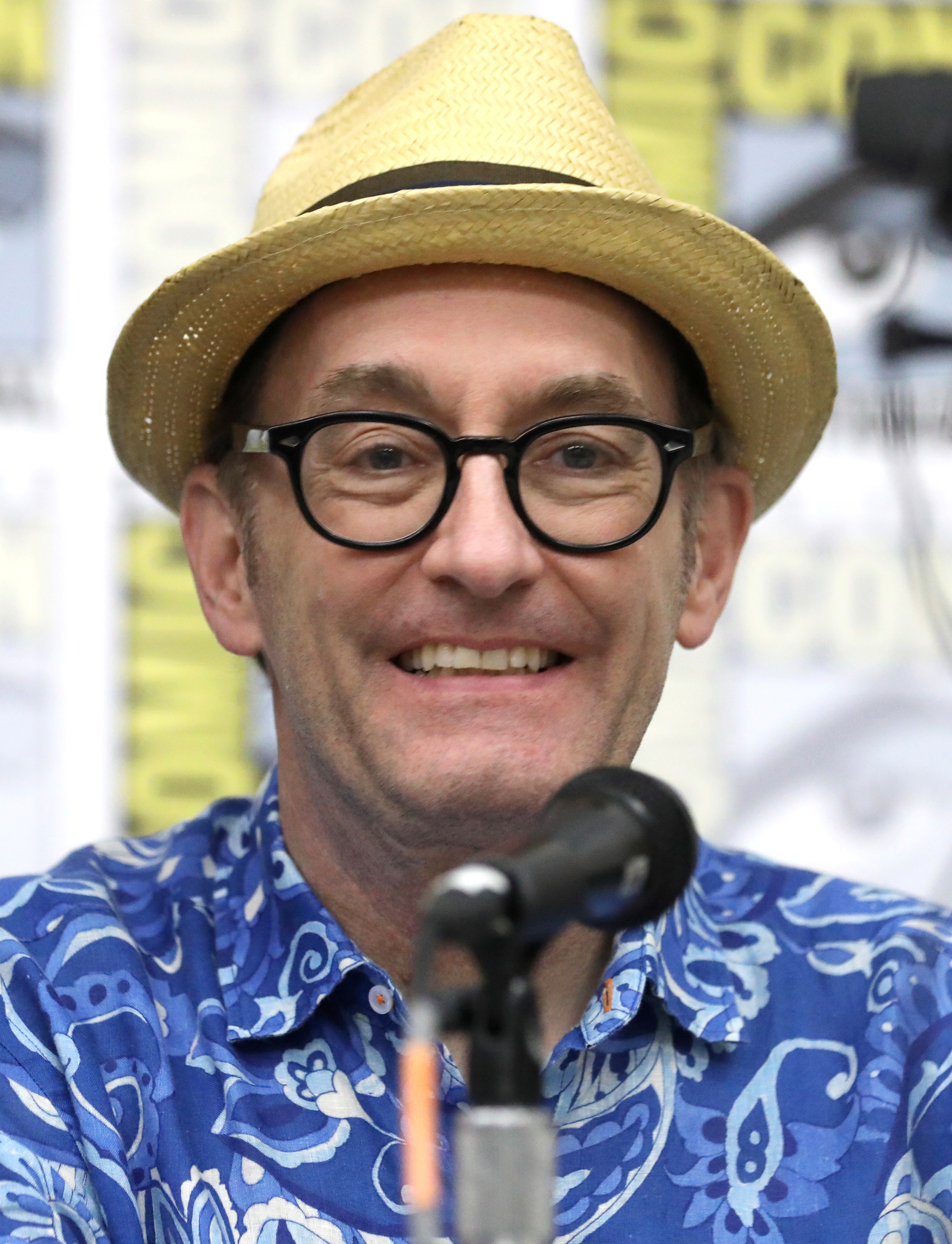
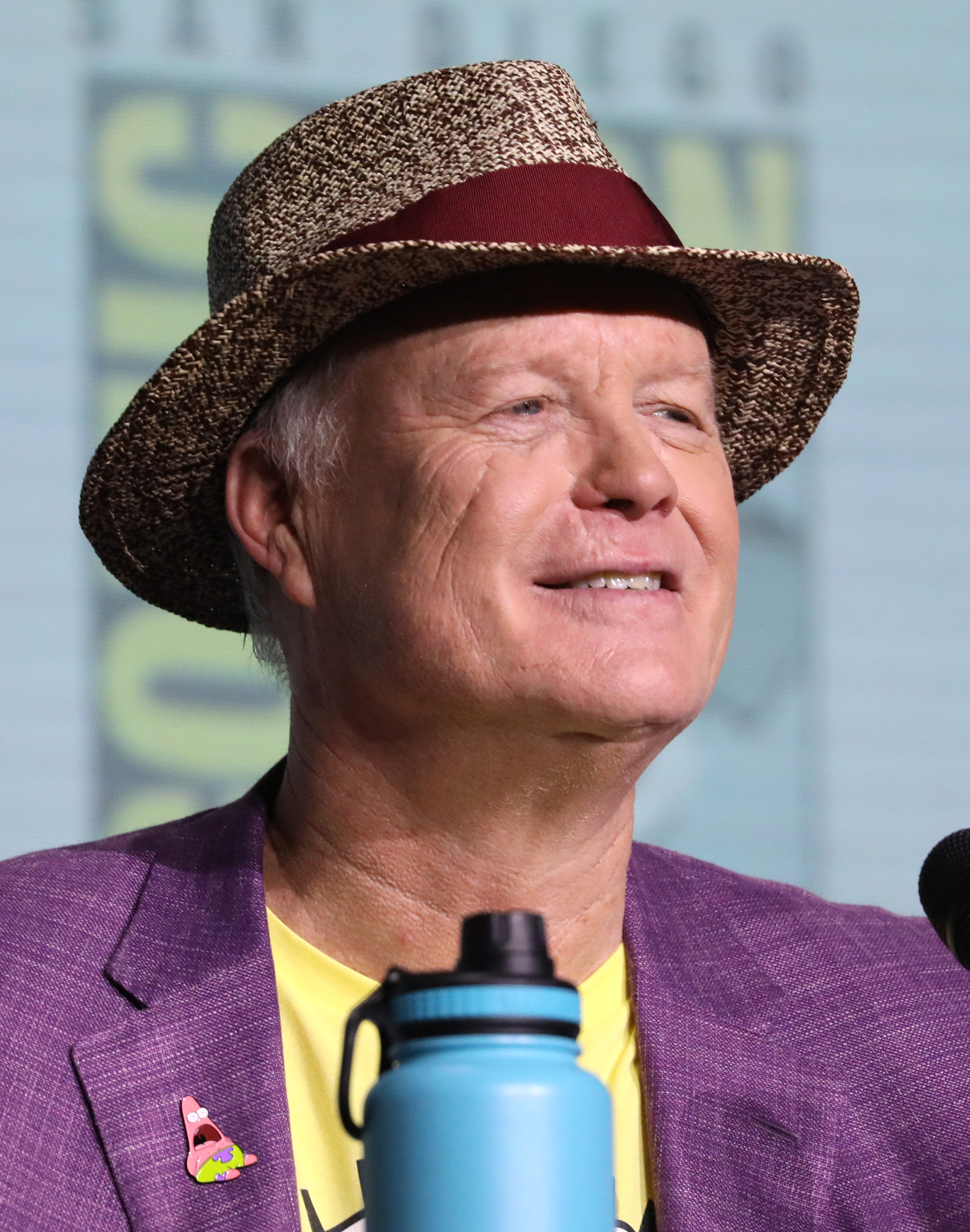
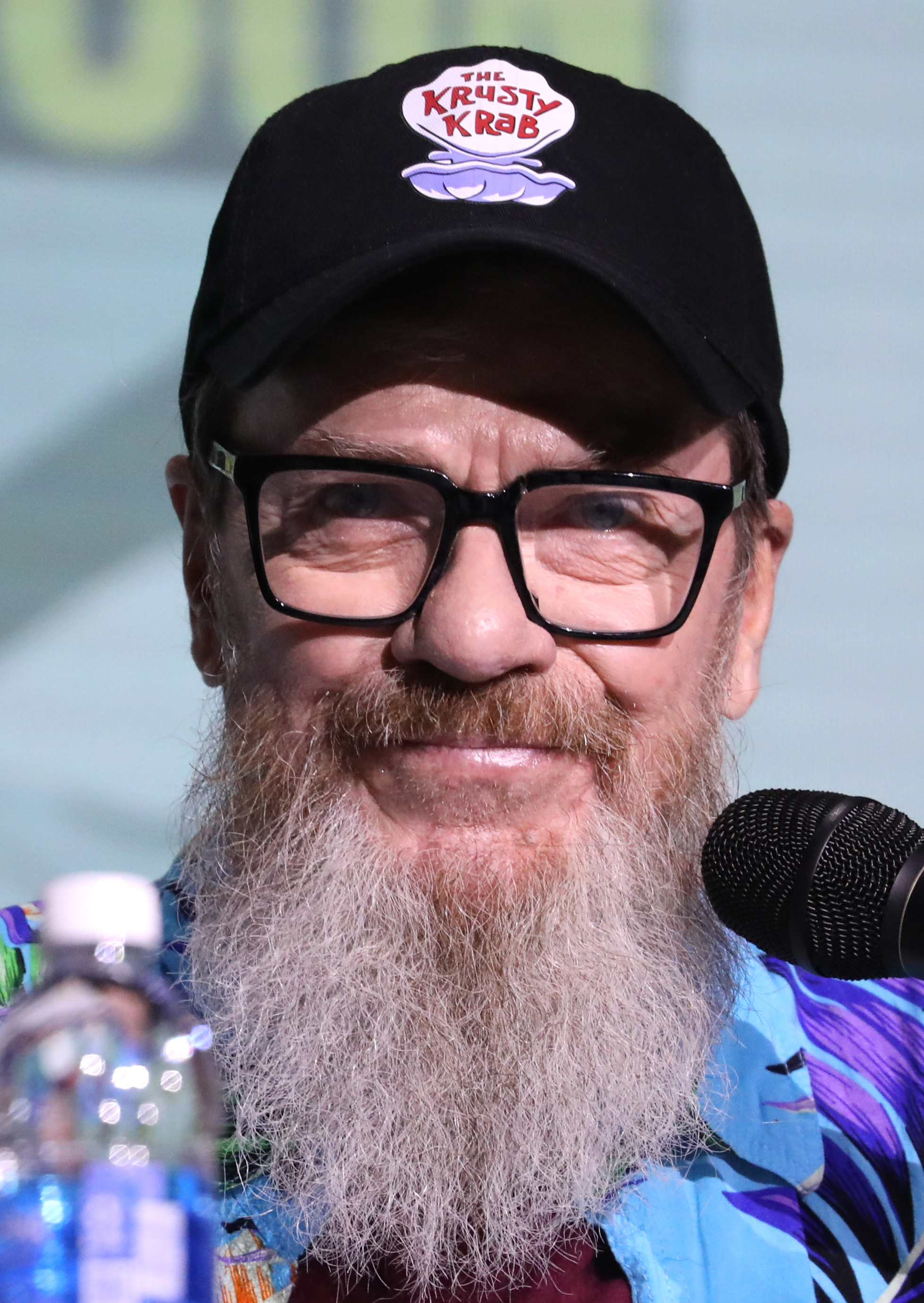
Left to right: Tom Kenny (SpongeBob), Bill Fagerbakke (Patrick), and Rodger Bumpass (Squidward)

For the voice of SpongeBob, the main character, Hillenburg approached Kenny, who previously worked with him on Rocko's Modern Life. Drymon said, "Steve [Hillenburg] wanted to find an original sounding voice [for SpongeBob]." Hillenburg utilized Kenny's and other people's personalities to help create the personality of SpongeBob. The voice of SpongeBob was originally used by Kenny for a minor character in Rocko's Modern Life. Kenny forgot the voice initially as he created it only for that single use. Hillenburg, however, remembered it when he was coming up with SpongeBob and used a video clip of the episode to remind Kenny of the voice. Kenny says that SpongeBob's high-pitched laugh was specifically created to be unique. They wanted an annoying laugh in the tradition of Popeye and Woody Woodpecker. Fagerbakke voices SpongeBob's best friend, a starfish named Patrick Star. He auditioned for the role after Kenny had been cast as SpongeBob. Fagerbakke said, "Steve is such a lovely guy, and I had absolutely no feeling for the material whatsoever." He described his experience in the audition, saying "I was just going in for another audition, and I had no idea what was in store there in terms of the remarkable visual wit and really the kind of endearing child-like humanity in the show. I couldn't pick that up from the audition material at all. I was just kind of perfunctorially trying to give the guy what he wanted."

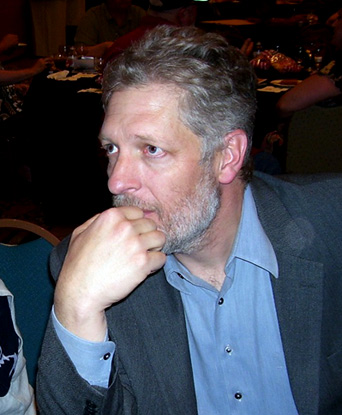
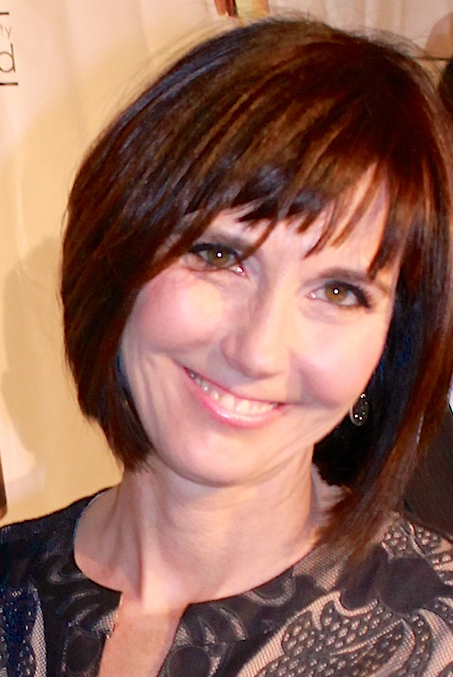
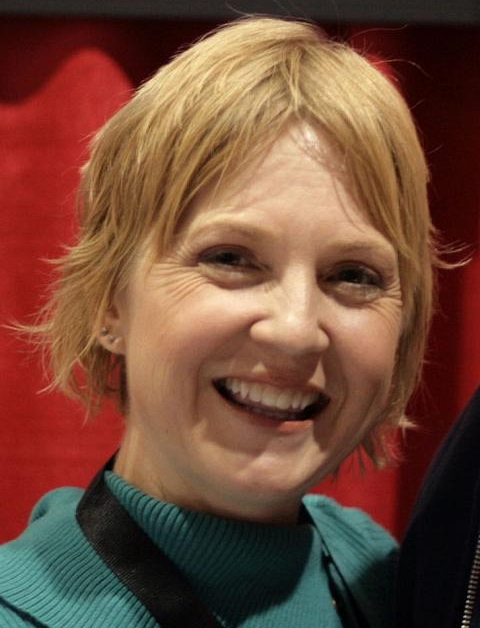
Left to right: Clancy Brown (Mr. Krabs), Jill Talley (Karen), and Carolyn Lawrence (Sandy Cheeks)

Rodger Bumpass provides the voice of Squidward Tentacles, and other characters. Squidward was "a very nasally, monotone kind of guy", said Bumpass. He said that the character "became a very interesting character to do" because of "his sarcasm, and then his frustration, and then his apoplexy, and so he became a wide spectrum of emotions". Voice acting veteran Clancy Brown voices Mr. Krabs, SpongeBob's boss at the Krusty Krab. For the character, Brown uses a voice that he describes as "piratey" with "a little Scottish brogue". According to Brown, his Mr. Krabs voice was improvised during his audition and it was not challenging for him to find the correct voice.

Mr. Lawrence had met Hillenburg previously on Rocko's Modern Life. When working on the pilot episode of SpongeBob, Hillenburg invited him to audition for all of the characters. Since other voices had been found for the main cast already, Lawrence started out by voicing a variety of minor characters. This included Plankton, who was initially only set to appear in one episode. Mr. Lawrence stated in an interview with Thomas F. Wilson that Nickelodeon executives told Hillenburg, "'we could stunt-cast this. You know, we could have Bruce Willis do this voice.' And Steve was just like, 'it's Doug [Lawrence], don't you hear it? This is the character! This is the guy!'" Jill Talley, Tom Kenny's wife, voices Karen Plankton. Being a Chicago native, she uses a Midwestern accent for the character. Electronic sound effects are underlaid by the series' audio engineers to create a robotic sound whenever she speaks. Talley and Lawrence often improvise their characters' dialogue. In 2009, Lawrence called improvisation his "favorite part of the voice over". He elaborated in a 2012 interview, saying, "I always enjoy the back-and-forth. [Talley and I] start to actually overlap so much talking to each other that [the voice directors] have to tell us, 'hey, stop doing that, separate what you're saying!'"

Carolyn Lawrence provides Sandy Cheeks' voice. When Lawrence was on a sidewalk in Los Feliz, Los Angeles with a friend who knew SpongeBob SquarePants casting director Donna Grillo, her friend said to the director that Lawrence had "an interesting voice". Grillo invited Lawrence to audition and she then got the role. American actress Mary Jo Catlett, who is known for her live-action roles on television programs from the 1970s such as Diff'rent Strokes and M*A*S*H, provides Mrs. Puff's voice. As of 2017, voicing Mrs. Puff has become her only regular television role; Catlett described herself as "basically retired" in 2013, since she is good friends with the other SpongeBob cast members, making the SpongeBob recording booth an easy environment that requires less preparation than in-person performances. Lori Alan voices Pearl. During her audition for the role, she was shown an early drawing of Pearl and took note of how the character was much larger than the rest of the cast. She decided to reflect the character's size in her voice by making it deep and full in tone. She aimed to make Pearl's voice invoke the sound of whales’ low vocalizations while also sounding "spoiled and lovable." In an interview with AfterBuzz TV, Alan said that she knew Pearl "had to sound somewhat like a child," but at the same time needed "an abnormally large voice."

In the Christmas special "Christmas Who?", the characters of Patchy the Pirate, the president of the fictional SpongeBob SquarePants fan club, and his pet called Potty the Parrot debuted. The former is portrayed by Kenny in live-action, while series creator Hillenburg voiced the latter. After Hillenburg's departure as the series' showrunner in 2004, staff writer Paul Tibbitt was given the role voicing Potty the Parrot. Mr. Krabs' mother, Mama Krabs, who debuted in the episode "Sailor Mouth", was voiced by Tibbitt. However, voice actress Sirena Irwin overtook Tibbitt's role as the character reappeared in the fourth season episode "Enemy In-Law" in 2005. Irwin also provides the voices of other characters in the show, including Margaret SquarePants, SpongeBob's mother.

Voice recording sessions always include a full cast of actors, which Kenny describes as "getting more unusual". Kenny said, "That's another thing that's given SpongeBob its special feel. Everybody's in the same room, doing it old radio-show style. It's how the stuff we like was recorded". It takes about four hours to record an 11-minute episode. For the first three seasons, Hillenburg and Drymon sat in on recording sessions at Nickelodeon Studios, and they directed the actors. In the fourth season, Andrea Romano took over the role as the voice director. Wednesday is recording day, the same schedule followed by the crew since 1999. Casting supervisor Jennie Monica Hammond said, "I loved Wednesdays".

=== Main cast ===
Actor	Character(s)	
Tom Kenny	SpongeBob SquarePants	Gary the Snail
Tom Kenny	Patchy the Pirate	French Narrator
Tom Kenny	Additional Voices	Additional Voices
Rodger Bumpass	Squidward Tentacles	Squidward Tentacles
Rodger Bumpass	Additional Voices	Additional Voices
Bill Fagerbakke	Patrick Star	Patrick Star
Bill Fagerbakke	Additional Voices	Additional Voices
Clancy Brown	Mr. Krabs	Mr. Krabs
Clancy Brown	Additional Voices	Additional Voices
Mr. Lawrence	Plankton	Potty the Parrot^{[B]}
Mr. Lawrence	Realistic Fish Head	Larry the Lobster
Mr. Lawrence	Additional Voices	Additional Voices
Jill Talley	Karen	Karen
Jill Talley	Additional Voices	Additional Voices
Carolyn Lawrence	Sandy Cheeks	Sandy Cheeks
Carolyn Lawrence	Additional Voices	Additional Voices
Mary Jo Catlett	Mrs. Puff	Mrs. Puff
Mary Jo Catlett	Additional Voices	Additional Voices
Lori Alan	Pearl	Pearl
Lori Alan	Additional Voices	Additional Voices

=== Other regular cast ===
Actor	Character(s)	
Carlos Alazraqui	Scooter	Scooter
Carlos Alazraqui	Additional Voices	Additional Voices
Dee Bradley Baker	Bubble Bass	Squilliam Fancyson
Dee Bradley Baker	Old Man Jenkins	Perch Perkins
Dee Bradley Baker	Additional Voices	Additional Voices
John Gegenhuber	Old Man Jenkins^{[D]}	Additional Voices
Sirena Irwin	Mama Krabs^{[B]}	Margaret SquarePants
Sirena Irwin	Additional Voices	Additional Voices
Bob Joles	Man Ray^{[C]}	Man Ray^{[C]}
Mark Fite	Additional Voices	Additional Voices
Thomas F. Wilson	Additional Voices	Additional Voices

== Recurring guest voices ==
Actor	Character(s)	Notes
Brian Doyle-Murray	The Flying Dutchman	Doyle-Murray appeared in ten episodes throughout the first eight seasons. He returned in the eleventh season starting with the episode "The Legend of Boo-Kini Bottom" after a six-year absence.
John O'Hurley	King Neptune	John O'Hurley voiced King Neptune in the episodes "Neptune's Spatula," "The Clash of Triton," "Trident Trouble," and "High Sea Diving."
Michael McKean	Captain Frostymug; Lonnie	McKean appeared twice during the show's ninth season, voicing Captain Frostymug in "License to Milkshake" and Lonnie the shark in "Sharks vs. Pods".

== Former cast members ==
Actor	Character(s)	Notes
Brad Abrell	Bubble Buddy	Abrell voiced Bubble Buddy and other minor characters during the show's second season. He reprised his role as Bubble Buddy for the eighth-season episode "Bubble Buddy Returns" and the eleventh-season episode "Bubbletown" but has not made an appearance since.
Ernest Borgnine	Mermaid Man	Borgnine made the most guest appearances on the show, voicing the character from 1999 to his death in 2012.
Tim Conway	Barnacle Boy	Conway first appeared in 1999 with his former McHale's Navy co-star Ernest Borgnine, who voiced Mermaid Man; he has since made over 15 appearances. In September 2018, showrunner Vincent Waller confirmed that Conway would not reprise his role as Barnacle Boy again due to health issues. Conway died on May 14, 2019.
Stephen Hillenburg	Potty the Parrot	Hillenburg voiced the recurring character during the show's second and third seasons. When he left the show as the showrunner, writer Tibbitt was given the role voicing the character as it reappeared in the fifth season episode "Friend or Foe".
Sara Paxton	Various characters	Paxton voiced many minor child characters in the show's first three seasons, but has not recorded new dialogue since likely because of her age, and commitments on other projects. An archival recording of Paxton's voice is used in the tenth-season episode "Unreal Estate."
Marion Ross	Grandma SquarePants	Marion Ross voiced Grandma SquarePants, SpongeBob's paternal grandmother, in the episodes "Grandma's Kisses," "BlackJack," "The Abrasive Side," "Pet Sitter Pat," and "Don't Make Me Laugh," and the video game Employee of the Month.
Paul Tibbitt	Potty the Parrot	Tibbitt took over the role of Potty from Stephen Hillenburg starting with "Friend or Foe" and last voiced the character in the eighth-season episode "It's a SpongeBob Christmas!".
Camryn Walling	Various characters	Walling voiced several child characters throughout the show's second and third seasons, but has not recorded new dialogue since. An archival recording of Walling's voice is used in the tenth-season episode "Unreal Estate."
Frank Welker	Various characters	Welker voiced several animal characters—including Clamu, Baby Oyster, Mystery the Seahorse, and the gorilla—during the third season, but has not appeared since.

== Awards and nominations ==
Year	Actor	Award	Category	Role	Episode	Result	Ref(s).
2001	Mary Jo Catlett	Annie Award	Outstanding Individual Achievement for Voice Acting by a Female Performer in an Animated Television Production	Mrs. Puff	"No Free Rides"	Nominated	
2001	Tom Kenny	Annie Award	Outstanding Individual Achievement for Voice Acting by a Male Performer in an Animated Television Production	SpongeBob SquarePants	"Wormy"	Nominated	
2008	Tom Kenny	Annie Award	Best Voice Acting in an Animated Television Production	SpongeBob SquarePants	"Spy Buddies"	Nominated	
2010	Tom Kenny	Annie Award	Best Voice Acting in a Television Production	SpongeBob SquarePants	"Truth or Square"	Won	
2012	Rodger Bumpass	Daytime Emmy Award	Outstanding Performer in an Animated Program	Squidward Tentacles		Nominated	
2018	Tom Kenny	Annie Award	Outstanding Achievement for Voice Acting in an Animated Television / Broadcast Production	SpongeBob SquarePants		Won	
2018	Tom Kenny	Daytime Emmy Award	Outstanding Performer in an Animated Program	SpongeBob SquarePants		Won	

== Notes ==
- A. Guest star Charles Nelson Reilly originally provided the voice of the character. Reilly died in 2007.
- B. Replaced Paul Tibbitt.
- C. Replaced John Rhys-Davies, who has voiced Man Ray in two episodes.
