= The Legend of Boo-Kini Bottom =

- SpongeBob SquarePants episode
- Promotional artwork for the episode
- Episode no.: Season 11; Episode 5
- Directed by: Mark Caballero (animation); Seamus Walsh (animation); Adam Paloian (supervising); Alan Smart (supervising); Tom Yasumi (timing)
- Written by: Mr. Lawrence
- Original air date: October 13, 2017

Guest appearance
- Brian Doyle-Murray as The Flying Dutchman

Episode chronology
← Previous "Larry the Floor Manager"	Next → "No Pictures Please"
- SpongeBob SquarePants (season 11)

"The Legend of Boo-Kini Bottom" is the fifth episode of the eleventh season, and the 220th overall episode of the American animated television series SpongeBob SquarePants. It originally aired on Nickelodeon in the United States on October 13, 2017. In this episode, the Flying Dutchman wants to make sure SpongeBob and his friends are scared on Halloween. It is the second SpongeBob episode to be animated through stop-motion instead of the usual 2D format following "It's a SpongeBob Christmas!".

The episode's stop-motion animation was produced at Screen Novelties (returning from "It's a SpongeBob Christmas!") and was directed by Mark Caballero and Seamus Walsh, two of the founders of the company. The animation style was inspired by those of the classic Rankin/Bass television specials. The episode is written by Mr. Lawrence and features an original song, "The Scare Song," which was written by Lawrence with music by Eban Schletter. Sally Cruikshank designed the 2D animated sequence in the episode.

Upon its premiere, "The Legend of Boo-Kini Bottom" was watched by 2.210 million viewers, making it the eighth highest-rated cable program of October 13, 2017. The episode received positive reviews from critics.

== Summary ==
On Halloween night, SpongeBob and Patrick prepare to go trick-or-treating. SpongeBob soon tells Patrick that he is scared of Halloween because of the costumes and decorations, but Patrick tricks SpongeBob into thinking "Scary equals funny".

They arrive at Sandy's house, where Sandy introduces them to her acorn monster. Patrick becomes terrified, but SpongeBob remains unaffected, believing "Scary equals funny". They both go to the Krusty Krab and the Chum Bucket, which are dressed as the opposite restaurant. At the Krusty Krab, Mr. Krabs tells them how Plankton makes chum, while at the Chum Bucket, Plankton and Karen tell a false story of how Mr. Krabs makes Krabby Patties; Both stories fail to frighten SpongeBob. Meanwhile, the Flying Dutchman becomes happy that the residents of Bikini Bottom are scared on Halloween, but SpongeBob's laughter interrupt him, and he descends to the town below.

After SpongeBob tells the Flying Dutchman about Patrick's deception, he decides to put SpongeBob and Patrick on a thriller ride to scare them. Although the ride frightens Patrick, SpongeBob enjoys the experience. The Flying Dutchman becomes furious, and locks up the souls of SpongeBob's friends. Patrick confesses that he lied to SpongeBob, returning the latter's fears. SpongeBob escapes, and returns to confront the Flying Dutchman with Sandy's acorn monster. The Flying Dutchman attacks him, saying that a sponge is too stupid to be scary. Plankton disagrees, saying that SpongeBob's stupidity is the scariest thing. Thinking this is false, the Flying Dutchman goes into SpongeBob's brain, where he is spooked by an imaginary baby SpongeBob. He flees the town, releasing the souls of SpongeBob's friends. The friends gather and celebrate Halloween together.

== Voice cast ==
"Actor/Actress"	Role
Tom Kenny	SpongeBob SquarePants; Jellyfish Bats; SpongeBob's Skin; SpongeBob's Skeleton; Gary
Bill Fagerbakke	Patrick Star; Acorn Monster; Eel
Rodger Bumpass	Squidward Tentacles; Fish kids Frog; Dragon
Clancy Brown	Mr. Krabs; Fish man Eyes
Carolyn Lawrence	Sandy Cheeks; Sandy Monster; Costumed Girl; Fish Kids; Kid Fish #2
Mr. Lawrence	Plankton; Buff ghost Ghost
Brian Doyle-Murray	The Flying Dutchman
Jill Talley	Karen; Costumed Boy; Fish Kids; Seahorse; Kid Fish #1

== Production ==
=== Announcement and development ===
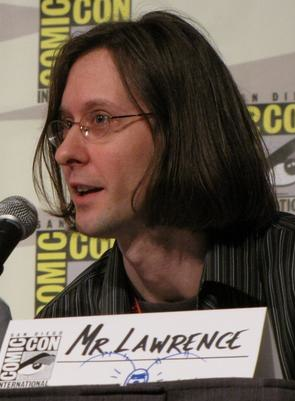
Mr Lawrence (pictured here in 2009) wrote "The Legend of Boo-Kini Bottom", as well as the original song featured in the episode, "The Scare Song".

In June 2017, The Hollywood Reporter reported that Nickelodeon had greenlit a stop-motion animated Halloween special episode of SpongeBob SquarePants. "The Legend of Boo-Kini Bottom" is produced by Screen Novelties in their second partnership with the series following the season 8 episode, "It's a SpongeBob Christmas!" which aired in 2012. Mark Caballero and Seamus Walsh of Screen Novelties served as directors, while Chris Finnegan produced. The episode was written by SpongeBob staff member Mr. Lawrence, with Brian Morante serving as the storyboard director. In addition, an original song, The Scare Song, was featured in the episode and was written by Mr. Lawrence with music by Eban Schletter.

According to Vincent Waller, the crew had been wanting to make another SpongeBob stop-motion special following "It's a SpongeBob Christmas!" and settled on Halloween as the episode theme. They felt that the medium of stop motion helped to enhance "the creepy factor" of the series' look, making it a good fit for the holiday. The idea for the episode was inspired by dark amusement park rides such as Disneyland's The Haunted Mansion. According to Walsh and Caballero, one of their short films prompted Waller and Marc Ceccarelli to contact them, as they felt that the studio shared a similar sense of humor to SpongeBob. The directors were excited about the gig because they had mostly been doing Christmas-related productions prior to the episode. In contrast to most SpongeBob episodes, which take about nine months to finish, "The Legend of Boo-Kini Bottom" took a year to complete production.

=== Animation ===
The animation style was inspired by those of the classic Rankin/Bass television specials. The special mixes several animation techniques, including stop-motion, marionette puppeting, and hand puppets. In addition, it features a 2D animated sequence designed by Sally Cruikshank. Screen Novelties were sent animatics, storyboards, and voice tracks, and were tasked with figuring out how to translate the 2-D sets and characters into 3-D stop motion. The studio would make adjustments when translating where they saw fit.

Each puppet has a skeleton consisting of a "wire and ball" combination so that they can be easily maneuvered. In the production of the episode, Screen Novelties utilized 27 unique sets across five stages. In making these sets, they incorporated 15 boxes of breakfast cereal, eight pounds of glitter, hundreds of popsicle sticks, black lights, and 315 strips of toupee tape. In addition, the team constructed a ship for The Flying Dutchman and a pinball machine. Patrick's knight costume was made using a stretched out stainless steel Brillo Pad. Puppet and set fabrication required about three months. Another three were spent on animation, and then an additional few more in post-production on the visual effects.

== Reception ==
"The Legend of Boo-Kini Bottom" premiered on Nickelodeon in the United States on October 13, 2017. The episode was watched by 2.210 million viewers, beating its lead out The Loud House by 44,000 viewers, and bringing a 0.47 18-49 rating, making it the eighth highest rated cable program of the day.

Emily Ashby of Common Sense Media gave the episode a 3 out of 5 star rating. She praised it for its stop-motion animation and "Halloween spirit." John Schwarz of Bubbleblabber gave the episode an 8.5 out of 10 rating. Though he felt the story was not noteworthy, he opined that the episode's visuals and the horror elements made up for it. In his review of the DVD release, John Corrado of The Joy of Movies praised the animation and said, "For fans of SpongeBob, The Legend of Boo-Kini Bottom works as an amusing and offbeat Halloween special that has some fun reimagining the 2D characters in a different way, and for everyone else it's an odd little curiosity that is worth checking out."

== Home media ==
"The Legend of Boo-Kini Bottom" was released on DVD on September 11, 2018, by Nickelodeon and Paramount Home Entertainment. The DVD included two featurettes, Behind the Scenes: The Legend of Boo-Kini Bottom and The Art of SpongeBob SquarePants: The Legend of Boo-Kini Bottom. On March 31, 2020, "The Legend of Boo-Kini Bottom" was released on the SpongeBob SquarePants: The Complete Eleventh Season DVD, alongside all episodes of the eleventh season. On October 15, 2024, "The Legend of Boo-Kini Bottom" was released on the SpongeBob SquarePants: Another 100 Episodes DVD, alongside all the episodes of seasons ten through fourteen.
