= Code Yellow =

Code Yellow may refer to:

- "Code Yellow" (Agents of S.H.I.E.L.D.), a 2019 episode from Agents of S.H.I.E.L.D.
- "Code Yellow", a 2017 episode from season 10 of SpongeBob SquarePants
