= SpongeBob SquarePants season 11 =

Season of television series

SpongeBob SquarePants
- Season 11
- DVD cover
- Showrunners: Marc Ceccarelli; Vincent Waller
- Starring: Tom Kenny; Bill Fagerbakke; Rodger Bumpass; Clancy Brown; Carolyn Lawrence; Mr. Lawrence; Jill Talley; Mary Jo Catlett; Lori Alan
- No. of episodes: 26 (50 segments)

Release
- Original network: Nickelodeon
- Original release: June 24, 2017 – November 25, 2018

Season chronology
- ← Previous; Season 10 Next → Season 12

The eleventh season of the American animated television series SpongeBob SquarePants, created by former marine biologist and animator Stephen Hillenburg, began airing on Nickelodeon in the United States on June 24, 2017, beginning with the episode "Spot Returns"/"The Check-Up", and ended on November 25, 2018, with the half-hour special "Goons on the Moon". The series chronicles the exploits and adventures of the title character and his various friends in the fictional underwater city of Bikini Bottom. The season was executive produced by series creator Hillenburg. The showrunners for this season were Marc Ceccarelli and Vincent Waller, who are also the supervising producers.

The season was first announced on March 3, 2016, along with the tenth season, and premiered on June 24, 2017. A total of 26 half-hour episodes were produced for the season, bringing the number of episodes up to 241.

The SpongeBob SquarePants: The Complete Eleventh Season DVD was released in region 1 on March 31, 2020, and region 4 on October 7, 2020.

== Production ==
On March 3, 2016, it was announced that the series had been renewed for an eleventh season. As with the previous season, the episodes are mainly script-driven, although "Krabby Patty Creature Feature", "Shopping List", "Bubbletown", and "The String" use the old board-driven format, meaning that the storyboard artists not only draw out a storyboard for the episode, but simultaneously write them. "Krabby Patty Creature Feature", "Bubbletown", and "Squirrel Jelly" are also the only episodes this season to have more than one writer.

Beginning with this season, the series' writers began an effort to give more storylines to the series' four main female characters (Karen, Sandy, Mrs. Puff, and Pearl). This led to the creation of the "Gal Pals", a friend group between the female characters, first introduced in the episode "Girls' Night Out". In an interview with People, Lori Alan explained, "Little by little, we've really been able to have more female plotlines." Jill Talley added, "It's nice too for all the little girls out there to see representation on the show."

== Episodes ==
The eleventh season of SpongeBob SquarePants consists of 26 episodes, which are ordered below according to Nickelodeon's packaging order, and not their original production or broadcast order.

| No. overall | No. in season | Title | Directed by (Note: Information is taken from the opening credits of each episode.) | Written by | Original release date | Prod. code | U.S. viewers (millions) |
|---|---|---|---|---|---|---|---|
| 216 | 1 | "Cave Dwelling Sponge" | Alan Smart (animation), Dave Cunningham (supervising) | Written by : Mr. Lawrence; Storyboarded by : Brian Morante | September 23, 2017 | 325–1102 | 1.92 |
| 216 | 1 | "The Clam Whisperer" | Bob Jaques (animation), Adam Paloian (supervising) | Written by : Ben Gruber; Storyboarded by : John Trabbic | September 23, 2017 | 325–1106 | 1.92 |
"Cave Dwelling Sponge": SpongeBob and Patrick go on a nature hike, and Patrick's tongue gets stuck to ice in a cave. SpongeBob melts the ice with hot chocolate, unknowingly releasing a prehistoric cave sponge. The cave sponge follows SpongeBob through his morning routine and to the Krusty Krab, making a mess and destroying property. SpongeBob is framed for the destruction caused by the cave sponge, and is sent to jail. The two are cleared of charges after they destroy the city hall, which was scheduled for demolition. "The Clam Whisperer": SpongeBob is followed by migrating clams, who disrupt people around town. He agrees to lead the clams away after complaints by the citizens, and after acting like a clam for a season, returns home.
| 217 | 2 | "Spot Returns" | Tom Yasumi (animation), Sherm Cohen (supervising) | Written by : Andrew Goodman; Storyboarded by : John Trabbic | June 24, 2017 | 325–1101 | 1.96 |
| 217 | 2 | "The Check-Up" | Tom Yasumi (animation), Sherm Cohen (supervising) | Written by : Andrew Goodman; Storyboarded by : John Trabbic | June 24, 2017 | 325–1103 | 1.96 |
"Spot Returns": Plankton's pet amoeba Spot has puppies, and Plankton gets them adopted with SpongeBob's help. When the amoeba puppies return to Plankton with their owners' items, he trains the puppies to steal the Krabby Patty secret formula. The plan is foiled by SpongeBob, who feeds the amoebas treats that cause them to grow and destroy the Chum Bucket. "The Check-Up": Mr. Krabs sneaks away from the Krusty Krab's annual health check-up, fearing that it will be painful. SpongeBob and Squidward try to give him the check-up without him knowing, and when their attempts do not work, they make Larry the Lobster dress as Mr. Krabs and pass the check-up.
| 218 | 3 | "Spin the Bottle" | Bob Jaques (animation), Adam Paloian (supervising) | Written by : Kaz; Storyboarded by : Fred Osmond | July 16, 2017 | 325–1107 | 1.99 |
| 218 | 3 | "There's a Sponge in My Soup" | Tom Yasumi (animation), Dave Cunningham (supervising) | Written by : Kaz; Storyboarded by : Kelly Armstrong | November 7, 2017 | 325–1104 | 1.46 |
"Spin the Bottle": Plankton acts as a wish-granting genie to get the secret formula. The genie bottle ends up with SpongeBob, who shares his wishes with his friends. Wanting more wishes, Patrick, Squidward, and Mr. Krabs fight over the genie bottle. A real genie appears, upset at Plankton for mishandling his bottle, and traps Mr. Krabs, Squidward, and Patrick in a ketchup bottle. "There's a Sponge in My Soup": In the winter, Mr. Krabs starts selling hot soup at the Krusty Krab. A group of hippies are attracted by the heat and begin living in the soup. After multiple attempts to get the hippies out, Mr. Krabs sends SpongeBob down into the soup, and he becomes a hippie himself. Finally, Mr. Krabs gets the hippies out by moving them to Squidward's bathtub.
| 219 | 4 | "Man Ray Returns" | Alan Smart and Tom Yasumi (animation), Adam Paloian (supervising) | Written by : Kaz; Storyboarded by : John Trabbic | September 30, 2017 | 325–1115 | 2.07 |
| 219 | 4 | "Larry the Floor Manager" | Bob Jaques (animation), Sherm Cohen (supervising) | Written by : Ben Gruber; Storyboarded by : Fred Osmond | September 30, 2017 | 325–1105 | 2.07 |
"Man Ray Returns": Man Ray rents Squidward's house for the weekend. Despite Man Ray's peaceful intentions, SpongeBob and Patrick provoke him and start a fight using objects in Squidward's house. When Squidward returns from vacation, his house crumbles from the damage caused to it in the fight. "Larry the Floor Manager": Stressed out from work, Mr. Krabs takes a break from managing the Krusty Krab and hires Larry. Larry proceeds to turn the Krusty Krab into a gym, upsetting SpongeBob, who teams up with other customers to remind Larry how good Krabby Patties taste.
| 220 | 5 | "The Legend of Boo-Kini Bottom" | Mark Caballero and Seamus Walsh; Tom Yasumi (timing); Adam Paloian (supervising) | Written by : Mr. Lawrence; Storyboarded by : Brian Morante and Sally Cruikshank | October 13, 2017 | 325–1109 | 2.21 |
| 220 | 5 | "The Legend of Boo-Kini Bottom" | Mark Caballero and Seamus Walsh; Tom Yasumi (timing); Adam Paloian (supervising) | Written by : Mr. Lawrence; Storyboarded by : Brian Morante and Sally Cruikshank | October 13, 2017 | 325–1110 | 2.21 |
In this special stop-motion episode, SpongeBob insists that "scary equals funny" on Halloween. This bothers the Flying Dutchman, who tries to scare him for good by capturing his friends.
| 221 | 6 | "No Pictures Please" | Tom Yasumi (animation), Dave Cunningham (supervising) | Written by : Mr. Lawrence; Storyboarded by : Fred Osmond | November 6, 2017 | 325–1117 | 1.84 |
| 221 | 6 | "Stuck on the Roof" | Bob Jaques (animation), Sherm Cohen (supervising) | Written by : Andrew Goodman; Storyboarded by : Kelly Armstrong | November 6, 2017 | 325–1108 | 1.84 |
"No Pictures Please": Patrick pretends to be a tour guide, leading a tourist named Rube around Bikini Bottom. When the two get in trouble and are cornered by an angry mob, the tourist reveals that he is an illusion and disappears. "Stuck on the Roof": SpongeBob climbs onto the roof of the Krusty Krab to get a Krabby Patty out of the chimney. He is unable to get down due to his fear of heights, and ends up building another Krusty Krab on top of the roof. This begins to attract customers, who enjoy dining on the roof, although a storm ruins the experience. SpongeBob quickly constructs a replica Krusty Krab as shelter from the rain. When he plays music, the customers' dancing causes the original Krusty Krab to sink underground, trapping Squidward.
| 222 | 7 | "Krabby Patty Creature Feature" | Alan Smart (animation), Adam Paloian (supervising) | Written by : Chris Allison, Ryan Kramer and Kaz; Storyboarded by : Chris Allison and Ryan Kramer | October 21, 2017 | 325–1119 | 1.99 |
| 222 | 7 | "Teacher's Pests" | Tom Yasumi (animation), Dave Cunningham (supervising) | Written by : Ben Gruber; Storyboarded by : John Trabbic | October 21, 2017 | 325–1118 | 1.99 |
"Krabby Patty Creature Feature": When two hipsters want a new kind of Krabby Patty, Mr. Krabs starts serving a prototype patty that turns those who eat it into zombies. SpongeBob is the only one to not get infected, and cures the zombies by feeding them Plankton's chum. "Teacher's Pests": After a boating accident, Mr. Krabs and Plankton have to attend boating school. The two's rivalry makes them unable to focus, and they fight during their driving test, causing them to crash. Plankton and Krabs, along with SpongeBob, end up stitched together in the hospital.
| 223 | 8 | "Sanitation Insanity" | Alan Smart (animation), Sherm Cohen (supervising) | Written by : Ben Gruber; Storyboarded by : Brian Morante | May 7, 2018 | 325–1111 | 1.35 |
| 223 | 8 | "Bunny Hunt" | Bob Jaques (animation), Adam Paloian (supervising) | Written by : Mr. Lawrence; Storyboarded by : Fred Osmond | March 30, 2018 | 325–1114 | 1.44 |
"Sanitation Insanity": When Mr. Krabs is too cheap to buy more garbage bags and creates a mess, he makes SpongeBob and Squidward drive a garbage truck and clean up trash around Bikini Bottom. However, Patrick is insistent on keeping his garbage, and the fight causes trash to splatter all over the Krusty Krab. "Bunny Hunt": A wild sea bunny ruins Squidward's garden. SpongeBob finds it cute and adopts it, inviting Patrick to help him take care of it. The bunny meets a female and reproduces, and the bunnies invade Squidward's house.
| 224 | 9 | "Squid Noir" | Alan Smart and Tom Yasumi (animation), Dave Cunningham (supervising) | Written by : Andrew Goodman; Storyboarded by : John Trabbic | November 10, 2017 | 325–1122 | 1.86 |
| 224 | 9 | "Scavenger Pants" | Bob Jaques (animation), Sherm Cohen (supervising) | Written by : Luke Brookshier; Storyboarded by : Brian Morante | November 9, 2017 | 325–1116 | 1.65 |
"Squid Noir": Squidward's clarinet disappears, so he, SpongeBob, and Patrick investigate suspects. The clarinet is revealed to have been stolen by jellyfish, who enjoy Squidward's music and let him play in their club. "Scavenger Pants": Squidward sends SpongeBob and Patrick on an increasingly difficult scavenger hunt to distract them. When they manage to find every object Squidward requests, he makes them search for his nonexistent long-lost brother. SpongeBob and Patrick find Squidward's mother, who reveals she only had Squidward; they ask her to adopt them and thus complete the scavenger hunt.
| 225 | 10 | "Cuddle E. Hugs" | Alan Smart and Tom Yasumi (animation), Adam Paloian (supervising) | Written by : Ben Gruber; Storyboarded by : Kelly Armstrong | November 8, 2017 | 325–1124 | 1.65 |
| 225 | 10 | "Pat the Horse" | Bob Jaques (animation), Dave Cunningham (supervising) | Written by : Kaz; Storyboarded by : Fred Osmond | December 2, 2017 | 325–1129 | 1.83 |
"Cuddle E. Hugs": When SpongeBob eats a rotten Krabby Patty, he begins to hallucinate a giant, fluffy hamster named Cuddle E. Hugs. Nobody else can see Cuddle, so he is encouraged to serve the rotten patty to other customers, leading them to share his hallucination. However, Cuddle begins to devour everyone in the Krusty Krab. After he reveals that the "E" in his name stands for "eat", SpongeBob feeds Cuddle the last of the rotten Krabby Patty, causing him to go into his own hallucination. "Pat the Horse": SpongeBob reads Patrick a storybook saying that he can be anything he wants, inspiring Patrick to act like a horse. However, Mr. Krabs takes this opportunity to use Patrick as a pony ride outside the Krusty Krab. Patrick runs away and Mr. Krabs makes Squidward act as a horse, leading to a race between SpongeBob and Mr. Krabs.
| 226 | 11 | "Chatterbox Gary" | Tom Yasumi (animation), Sherm Cohen (supervising) | Written by : Luke Brookshier; Storyboarded by : John Trabbic | February 12, 2018 | 325–1123 | 1.70 |
| 226 | 11 | "Don't Feed the Clowns" | Alan Smart (animation), Adam Paloian (supervising) | Written by : Mr. Lawrence; Storyboarded by : Brian Morante | February 12, 2018 | 325–1125 | 1.70 |
"Chatterbox Gary": SpongeBob orders Gary a pet translation collar, allowing others to understand his speech. However, Squidward feels offended by Gary's critique of his art, and swaps out Gary's collar for his own microphone, allowing him to boss around SpongeBob under the guise of Gary. "Don't Feed the Clowns": A little clown is left behind by the circus, and SpongeBob tries to help him find new work. The clown fails as a hot dog vendor, an office worker, a firefighter, and a baker, but is happily returned to the wild with other clowns.
| 227 | 12 | "Drive Happy" | Alan Smart (animation), Adam Paloian (supervising) | Written by : Kaz; Storyboarded by : Brian Morante | February 13, 2018 | 325–1136 | 1.63 |
| 227 | 12 | "Old Man Patrick" | Bob Jaques (animation), Dave Cunningham (supervising) | Written by : Kaz; Storyboarded by : Fred Osmond | February 14, 2018 | 325–1132 | 1.63 |
"Drive Happy": SpongeBob buys a self-driving car named Coupe, who turns out to act snobby and entitled. When Coupe insists that the Krusty Krab is too "low-class" and refuses to take him there for work, SpongeBob takes out his own steering wheel and forcibly drives Coupe to the Krusty Krab. SpongeBob then makes him work as a kiddy ride in front of the Krusty Krab, to his displeasure. "Old Man Patrick": Patrick goes to the Shady Shoals rest home for ice cream, but ends up spending so much time there that he turns into an old man. SpongeBob takes Patrick and his elderly friends to an arcade to encourage them to have fun.
| 228 | 13 | "Fun-Sized Friends" | Tom Yasumi (animation), Sherm Cohen (supervising) | Written by : Andrew Goodman; Storyboarded by : Kelly Armstrong | February 15, 2018 | 325–1130 | 1.97 |
| 228 | 13 | "Grandmum's the Word" | Tom Yasumi (animation), Dave Cunningham (supervising) | Written by : Mr. Lawrence; Storyboarded by : John Trabbic | February 16, 2018 | 325–1131 | 1.45 |
"Fun-Sized Friends": SpongeBob and Patrick create sentient, smaller versions of themselves. However, the smaller SpongeBob and Patrick begin to feel mistreated and take revenge on their larger counterparts. "Grandmum's the Word": To impress Plankton's grandma on her birthday, Plankton claims that he is the owner of the Krusty Krab. Mr. Krabs, SpongeBob, and Squidward prepare for the visit, although Plankton's grandma turns out to have visited to betray Plankton and steal the secret formula.
| 229 | 14 | "Doodle Dimension" | Bob Jaques (animation), Sherm Cohen (supervising) | Written by : Luke Brookshier; Storyboarded by : John Trabbic | March 9, 2018 | 325–1133 | 1.30 |
| 229 | 14 | "Moving Bubble Bass" | Alan Smart and Tom Yasumi (animation), Adam Paloian (supervising) | Written by : Mr. Lawrence; Storyboarded by : Fred Osmond | March 16, 2018 | 325–1141 | 1.35 |
"Doodle Dimension": After messing with one of Sandy's inventions, SpongeBob and Patrick are brought to a blank white dimension. Everything they draw comes to life, and they accidentally bring back DoodleBob, who battles them with his own drawn creations. "Moving Bubble Bass": Bubble Bass is forced to move from his mother's basement to his grandmother's house. He tricks SpongeBob and Patrick into moving his belongings by promising them a free lunch.
| 230 | 15 | "High Sea Diving" | Bob Jaques (animation), Dave Cunningham (supervising) | Written by : Kaz; Storyboarded by : Brian Morante | April 6, 2018 | 325–1138 | 1.21 |
| 230 | 15 | "Bottle Burglars" | Alan Smart and Tom Yasumi (animation), Adam Paloian (supervising) | Written by : Luke Brookshier; Storyboarded by : John Trabbic | April 13, 2018 | 325–1135 | 1.23 |
"High Sea Diving": SpongeBob attempts to dive to the surface of the ocean, but is stopped by a wall of garbage. There, he meets a delusional elderly man who believes he is King Neptune. The trash that SpongeBob and the man throw during their fight sinks to the bottom, which the citizens of Bikini Bottom find practical uses for. "Bottle Burglars": Squidward accidentally throws the Krabby Patty secret formula away while cleaning, so he and SpongeBob have to sneak into the Chum Bucket to get it back.
| 231 | 16 | "My Leg!" | Alan Smart and Tom Yasumi (animation), Adam Paloian (supervising) | Written by : Mr. Lawrence; Storyboarded by : Fred Osmond | May 8, 2018 | 325–1143 | 1.24 |
| 231 | 16 | "Ink Lemonade" | Bob Jaques (animation), Dave Cunningham (supervising) | Written by : Kaz; Storyboarded by : Kelly Armstrong | May 9, 2018 | 325–1142 | 1.31 |
"My Leg!": Incidental fish Fred continually hurts his legs, so SpongeBob tries to keep him from danger. However, Fred confesses that he does it on purpose because he likes a nurse at the hospital, leading SpongeBob to help injure him. "Ink Lemonade": Patrick uses Squidward's ink in his lemonade. When SpongeBob and Patrick begin to sell out of "ink lemonade," Patrick scares more ink out of Squidward.
| 232 | 17 | "Mustard O' Mine" | Alan Smart and Tom Yasumi (animation), Adam Paloian (supervising) | Written by : Kaz; Storyboarded by : Brian Morante | May 10, 2018 | 325–1147 | 1.30 |
| 232 | 17 | "Shopping List" | Alan Smart and Tom Yasumi (animation), Sherm Cohen (supervising) | Written by : Zeus Cervas; Storyboarded by : Zeus Cervas | September 24, 2018 | 325–1140 | 1.08 |
"Mustard O' Mine": Mr. Krabs sends SpongeBob, Patrick and Squidward to dig up mustard at the Mustard Mines. The three eventually find mustard, but are confronted by an old prospector who tries to keep it for himself. "Shopping List": Mr. Krabs sends SpongeBob and Sandy to get exotic ingredients for Krabby Patties. Plankton follows them, but fails to get the ingredients successfully, leading him to steal them from Sandy and SpongeBob. Mr. Krabs confesses that the list was fake and only used to distract Plankton, leading Sandy to beat up him and Plankton.
| 233 | 18 | "Whale Watching" | Bob Jaques (animation), Dave Cunningham (supervising) | Written by : Andrew Goodman; Storyboarded by : John Trabbic | August 6, 2018 | 325–1144 | 1.59 |
| 233 | 18 | "Krusty Kleaners" | Alan Smart (animation), Sherm Cohen (supervising) | Written by : Kaz; Storyboarded by : Brian Morante | August 7, 2018 | 325–1151 | 1.40 |
"Whale Watching": Mr. Krabs hires Squidward to babysit Pearl, promising a work shift without SpongeBob if nothing goes wrong. However, Pearl sneaks out to go to a party, while Squidward follows. Pearl is dared to jump out of the water, leaving her stranded on an island until Squidward rescues her. "Krusty Kleaners": SpongeBob delivers food to an office building, but accidentally spills a milkshake. That night, he returns with Patrick to clean the entire building, but is chased by a cleaning robot and other sentient office supplies.
| 234 | 19 | "Patnocchio" | Tom Yasumi (animation), Adam Paloian (supervising) | Written by : Mr. Lawrence; Storyboarded by : Fred Osmond | August 8, 2018 | 325–1146 | 1.22 |
| 234 | 19 | "ChefBob" | Alan Smart (animation), Dave Cunningham (supervising) | Written by : Kaz; Storyboarded by : Kelly Armstrong | August 9, 2018 | 325–1145 | 1.04 |
"Patnocchio": In a parody of Walt Disney's Pinocchio, Plankton pretends to be Patrick's conscience to get a Krabby Patty. "ChefBob": When the customers are entertained by watching SpongeBob cook, Mr. Krabs creates an open kitchen. SpongeBob develops stage fright until he creates a puppet named ChefBob that cooks the food, although it soon turns against him and insults the customers.
| 235 | 20 | "Plankton Paranoia" | Tom Yasumi (animation), Adam Paloian (supervising) | Written by : Luke Brookshier; Storyboarded by : John Trabbic | September 26, 2018 | 325–1139 | 1.18 |
| 235 | 20 | "Library Cards" | Bob Jaques (animation), Sherm Cohen (supervising) | Written by : Mr. Lawrence; Storyboarded by : Fred Osmond | September 25, 2018 | 325–1152 | 1.25 |
"Plankton Paranoia": Mr. Krabs becomes paranoid that Plankton will steal the formula, going insane and believing that everybody are after it. "Library Cards": Patrick gets addicted to reading after spending time in SpongeBob's library; however, he gets so smart that his brain gets stuck in the library's doorway. SpongeBob tries to find a way to shrink Patrick's brain back to normal.
| 236 | 21 | "Call the Cops" | Bob Jaques (animation), Sherm Cohen (supervising) | Written by : Kaz; Storyboarded by : John Trabbic | September 27, 2018 | 325–1157 | 1.19 |
| 236 | 21 | "Surf N' Turf" | Alan Smart (animation), Dave Cunningham (supervising) | Written by : Kaz; Storyboarded by : Zeus Cervas | November 11, 2018 | 325–1156 | 1.40 |
"Call the Cops": Plankton is arrested, and the Krabby Patty formula is taken as evidence. SpongeBob and Mr. Krabs impersonate police officers to get it back, catching a real criminal along the way, while Plankton is put in a cell with Patrick and tries to escape. After a long fight in the evidence room, SpongeBob (who told the truth out of fear) and Mr. Krabs are arrested and locked up in the same cell with Plankton, Patrick, and the criminal. "Surf N' Turf": Sandy participates in a ship-in-a-bottle contest. SpongeBob calls Mr. Krabs to help her, and he turns her entire treedome into a ship.
| 237 | 22 | "Goons on the Moon" "SpaceBob MerryPants" | Alan Smart and Tom Yasumi (animation), Dave Cunningham and Adam Paloian (supervising) | Written by : Kaz; Storyboarded by : Brian Morante | November 25, 2018 | 325–1120 | 1.34 |
| 237 | 22 | "Goons on the Moon" "SpaceBob MerryPants" | Alan Smart and Tom Yasumi (animation), Dave Cunningham and Adam Paloian (supervising) | Written by : Kaz; Storyboarded by : Brian Morante | November 25, 2018 | 325–1121 | 1.34 |
Sandy takes SpongeBob, Pearl, and a nerdy squid named Squidina on a trip to the moon. While delivering food, Squidward arrives right as their rocket takes off, and is taken to the moon as well. The group meets Santa Claus while searching for intelligent life.
| 238 | 23 | "Appointment TV" | Bob Jaques (animation), Sherm Cohen (supervising) | Written by : Andrew Goodman; Storyboarded by : John Trabbic | October 28, 2018 | 325–1127 | 1.25 |
| 238 | 23 | "Karen's Virus" | Alan Smart and Tom Yasumi (animation), Adam Paloian (supervising) | Written by : Kaz; Storyboarded by : Fred Osmond | November 4, 2018 | 325–1112 | 1.20 |
"Appointment TV": SpongeBob is excited to watch a never-before-seen two-part special episode of Mermaid Man and Barnacle Boy and is prepared for it after his shift at the Krusty Krab. However, as he is going home, SpongeBob is constantly delayed by his friends, and misses the airing. To cheer him up, SpongeBob's friends re-enact the episode on stage. "Karen's Virus": Karen gets a virus due to hanging out with a sick computer friend, so Plankton enlists SpongeBob's help to defeat the virus. Meanwhile, as SpongeBob is hunting for the virus, Karen goes around town in a delirious state.
| 239 | 24 | "The Grill is Gone" | Alan Smart (animation), Adam Paloian (supervising) | Written by : Andrew Goodman; Storyboarded by : Fred Osmond | October 21, 2018 | 325–1148 | 1.37 |
| 239 | 24 | "The Night Patty" | Bob Jaques (animation), Dave Cunningham (supervising) | Written by : Luke Brookshier; Storyboarded by : Kelly Armstrong | October 21, 2018 | 325–1150 | 1.37 |
"The Grill is Gone": SpongeBob is tasked to clean the Krusty Krab when he notices that the grill is missing. He follows the trail to the home of a group of kids, who have stolen the grill to use it as a race car. Mr. Krabs and SpongeBob enter a race against the kids to recover the grill. "The Night Patty": Patrick introduces SpongeBob to the Krusty Krab's night shift crew. He goes to help them out, although they disapprove of his Krabby Patties. When he finds a solution, burning the patties and serving their "ghosts," a villainous fisherman invades the restaurant. SpongeBob defeats him, only to learn that he is actually the night shift crew's boss. That morning, Mr. Krabs enters and tells SpongeBob that he had hallucinated the entire experience.
| 240 | 25 | "Bubbletown" | Alan Smart and Tom Yasumi (animation), Dave Cunningham (supervising) | Written by : Andrew Goodman and John Trabbic; Storyboarded by : John Trabbic | October 28, 2018 | 325–1113 | 1.25 |
| 240 | 25 | "Girls' Night Out" | Bob Jaques (animation), Sherm Cohen (supervising) | Written by : Mr. Lawrence; Storyboarded by : Brian Morante | November 4, 2018 | 325–1158 | 1.20 |
"Bubbletown": SpongeBob visits Bubble Buddy in Bubbletown, a city made of and inhabited by bubbles. He accidentally slips on some soap, popping the entire town, and is sentenced to jail. Mr. Krabs receives a message from SpongeBob that he cannot come to work, and goes to Bubbletown to free SpongeBob from prison. When Mr. Krabs pops the town, SpongeBob is devastated until Bubble Buddy arrives to restore it. "Girls' Night Out": Sandy, Mrs. Puff, and Karen hang out at a cafe. When Mrs. Puff and Karen talk about how SpongeBob and Plankton, respectively, are annoying to them, the trio decides to prank both of them. Putting a VR headset on a sleepwalking SpongeBob, he mistakenly believes that he can drive, and they attempt to stop him.
| 241 | 26 | "Squirrel Jelly" | Tom Yasumi (animation), Sherm Cohen and Adam Paloian (supervising) | Written by : Kaz and Zeus Cervas; Storyboarded by : Brian Morante | November 18, 2018 | 325–1137 325–1155 | 1.38 |
| 241 | 26 | "The String" | Alan Smart and Tom Yasumi (animation), Adam Paloian (supervising) | Written by : Fred Osmond; Storyboarded by : Fred Osmond | November 18, 2018 | 325–1159 (Note: Originally #325–1215.) | 1.38 |
"Squirrel Jelly": SpongeBob and Patrick go jellyfishing, while Sandy accompanies them. Her competitive nature leads to the destruction of Jellyfish Fields. "The String": SpongeBob spots a loose thread on Squidward's shirt. While unraveling it, he winds up destroying the Krusty Krab, Bikini Bottom, and eventually reality itself.

== DVD release ==
The DVD boxset for season eleven was released by Paramount Home Entertainment and Nickelodeon in the United States and Canada on March 31, 2020. The DVD release features bonus materials, including the animated short "Plankton's Color Nullifier".

SpongeBob SquarePants: The Complete Eleventh Season
| Set details | | | Special features |
| 26 episodes (50 segment episodes); 3-disc set; 1.78:1 aspect ratio; Languages: English (Dolby Digital 5.1); Spanish (Dolby Stereo); French (Dolby Stereo) | | | Animated short: "Plankton's Color Nullifer" |
| Release dates | | | Animated short: "Plankton's Color Nullifer" |
| Region 1 | Region 2 | Region 4 | Animated short: "Plankton's Color Nullifer" |
| March 31, 2020 | TBA | October 7, 2020 | Animated short: "Plankton's Color Nullifer" |
Episodes
Disc 1: "Cave Dwelling Sponge", "The Clam Whisperer", "Spot Returns", "The Check-Up", "Spin the Bottle", "There's a Sponge in My Soup", "Man Ray Returns", "Larry the Floor Manager", "The Legend of Boo-Kini Bottom", "No Pictures Please", "Stuck on the Roof", "Krabby Patty Creature Feature", "Teacher's Pests", "Sanitation Insanity", "Bunny Hunt", "Squid Noir", and "Scavenger Pants"; Disc 2: "Cuddle E. Hugs", "Pat the Horse", "Chatterbox Gary", "Don't Feed the Clowns", "Drive Happy", "Old Man Patrick", "Fun-Sized Friends", "Grandmum's the Word", "Doodle Dimension", "Moving Bubble Bass", "High Sea Diving", "Bottle Burglars", "My Leg!", "Ink Lemonade", "Mustard O' Mine", "Shopping List", "Whale Watching", and "Krusty Kleaners"; Disc 3: "Patnocchio", "ChefBob", "Plankton Paranoia", "Library Cards", "Call the Cops", "Surf N' Turf", "Goons on the Moon", "Appointment TV", "Karen's Virus", "The Grill is Gone", "The Night Patty", "Bubbletown", "Girls' Night Out", "Squirrel Jelly", and "The String"
