= Squid Noir =

- SpongeBob SquarePants episode
- Title Card
- Episode no.: Season 11; Episode 9a
- Directed by: Alan Smart (animation and supervising); Tom Yasumi (animation); John Trabbic (storyboard); Dave Cunningham (supervising)
- Written by: Andrew Goodman
- Production code: 325-1122
- Original air date: November 10, 2017

Episode chronology
← Previous "Bunny Hunt"	Next → "Scavenger Pants"
- SpongeBob SquarePants (season 11)

"Squid Noir" is the first half of the ninth episode of the eleventh season and the 224th overall episode of the American animated television series SpongeBob SquarePants. The episode originally aired on Nickelodeon in the United States on November 10, 2017. This episode aired as part of a premiere week of new SpongeBob episodes called "You Bring the Color". During the premiere week, users could color in frames from the SpongeBob SquarePants theme song online and had a chance for them to be used in the opening sequence. The original American airing of "Squid Noir" featured each frame of the last minute of the episode also colored by viewers. The episode revolves around Squidward's clarinet suddenly disappearing prior to his open mic performance.

The episode was written by Andrew Goodman, storyboarded by John Trabbic, and directed by Dave Cunningham, with Alan Smart and Tom Yasumi serving as animation directors. The episode is unique for the series as the majority of the episode is in black-and-white and 1.33:1 full screen, parodying the film noir genre. "Squid Noir" was met with decent reception from critics.

== Plot summary ==
Squidward plays his clarinet in the Krusty Krab as preparation for an open mic night, to the annoyance of the customers. When Mr. Krabs kicks him out, he goes to a comic book store and begins practicing again. His poor playing causes Bubble Bass to drop his action figure in surprise, breaking it, and he threatens to break Squidward's clarinet. Frustrated, Squidward goes home and practices, causing Patrick to throw a rock at him.

The day before his recital, Squidward puts his clarinet down and takes a nap. He returns to find his window broken and jelly near where his clarinet was. Squidward begins viewing the world in monochrome and narrates his search for the clarinet. He accuses SpongeBob of taking it, who proves his innocence by showing that he was visiting his grandmother's house at the time.

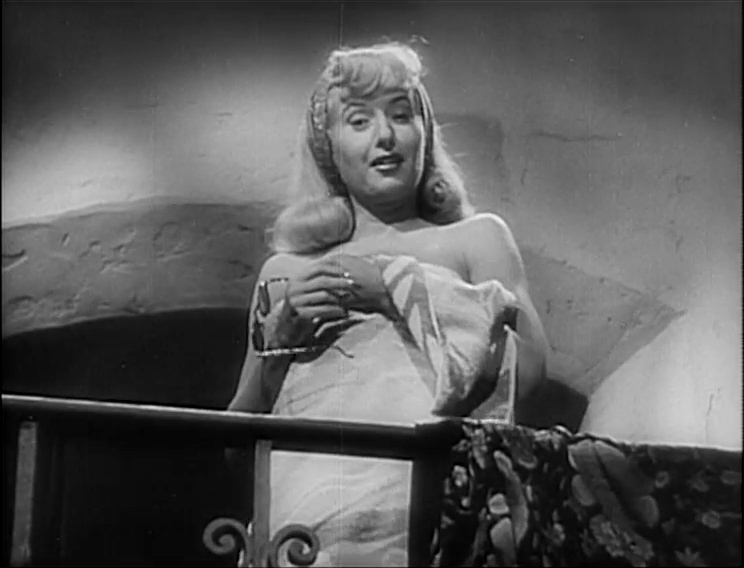
After receiving a makeover by SpongeBob and Squidward, Mr. Krabs resembles actress Barbara Stanwyck, who is notable for her role in the film noir Double Indemnity.

Now joined by SpongeBob in his search, Squidward goes to Mr. Krabs to do a "good cop, bad cop" routine. Mr. Krabs shows that he had been counting his money all day and was not near Squidward's house. At the comic book store with Squidward, SpongeBob finds Bubble Bass and battles him with an action figure. After the fight, Bubble Bass's action figure breaks and he begins crying, as Squidward concludes that the comic book store was a dead end. Back at Squidward's house, SpongeBob and Squidward find Patrick, who shows them the jellyfish jelly. The three go to Jellyfish Fields, where Squidward recovers his clarinet from a jellyfish, restoring color and ending his narration. That night, Squidward plays in a jazz club for the jellyfish, SpongeBob, Patrick, and Mr. Krabs. Although, the three are shown with their ears covered.

== Reception ==
"Squid Noir" was watched by 1.855 million viewers on its premiere, with a Nielsen rating of 0.4, making it the fifth most-watched cable program of the day.

John Schwartz of Bubble Blabber gave the episode a score of 6 out of 10, praising its colors and black and white "noir" look, while criticizing its premise, feeling it was too clichéd, and its "pretty plain jane" dialogue. Blake Harper of Fatherly included the episode in his list of "The 10 Best Kids Television Episodes of the Last 10 Years", calling the episode "a hilarious tribute to the classic noir genre" and writing "It's episodes like these that prove the show is every bit as dumb and brilliant as you remember."

== Merchandising ==
On March 31, 2020, "Squid Noir" was released on the SpongeBob SquarePants: The Complete Eleventh Season DVD, alongside all episodes of the eleventh season. On October 15, 2024, "Squid Noir" was released on the SpongeBob SquarePants: Another 100 Episodes DVD, alongside all the episodes of seasons ten through fourteen.
