= SpongeBob SquarePants: Plankton's Robotic Revenge =

2013 video game

- North American cover art
- Developer: Behaviour Interactive (Note: Co-developed for the Nintendo DS by Engine Software)
- Publisher: Activision
- Series: SpongeBob SquarePants
- Platforms: PlayStation 3 Xbox 360; Wii; Wii U Nintendo DS; Nintendo 3DS
- Release: EU: October 11, 2013; NA: October 22, 2013; AU: October 23, 2013
- Genres: Action-adventure, platform
- Modes: Single-player, multiplayer

SpongeBob SquarePants: Plankton's Robotic Revenge is a 2013 action-adventure platform video game developed by Behaviour Interactive and published by Activision, based on the SpongeBob SquarePants series by Nickelodeon; in the game, players control SpongeBob, Patrick, Squidward, Mr. Krabs and Sandy as they attempt to stop Plankton from stealing the Krabby Patty formula. It released in Europe on October 11, 2013. North America saw its release on October 22, 2013 for the PlayStation 3, Xbox 360, Wii, Wii U, Nintendo DS, and Nintendo 3DS.

Previous SpongeBob games were published by THQ, who had the license since 2001, but following their liquidation on January 23, 2013, Activision took over the license. Upon release, Plankton's Robotic Revenge was met with generally negative reviews, with many criticizing the gameplay as boring and repetitive.

== Gameplay ==
Players can purchase and upgrade their weapons of choice. The PlayStation 3, Xbox 360 and Wii versions of the game feature four-player co-op, whilst the Wii U version allows for an additional fifth player when using a GamePad with four other controllers. Portable versions are solely single-player games. The playable characters include SpongeBob, Patrick, Squidward, Sandy, and Mr. Krabs.

== Plot ==
A cargo ship accidentally drops batteries into the ocean. Plankton finds them and uses them to power his giant robot and robot army and takes the safe with the Krabby Patty secret formula. He also takes the map to the key and the two copies of it that opens the safe. SpongeBob and his friends have to stop him, defeat his robot minions and family members, retrieve the batteries, and find the three keys before he does to get the formula back. They fight Plankton in the Dutchman's Triangle, but he retreats. The team then fight two of Plankton's family members, Rainchild and Clem, who also have giant robots, in other areas. After getting the first two keys and batteries, they go back to the Krusty Krab and battle Plankton again. After he is defeated, they retrieve the last battery and find the last key under the doormat and use it to open the safe. In the bottle was a note saying the formula is in Mr. Krabs' pocket the whole time. Squidward expresses his shock that they have been through the whole thing for nothing. That night, when SpongeBob and Patrick are watching TV in Patrick's house, SpongeBob wonders where the batteries went and is amazed that Patrick's TV is working so well. It is then revealed that the batteries were powering the TV from the outside.

== Development ==
The game was announced on July 25, 2013. A trailer for the game was released the same day.

== Reception ==
Reception

Review scores
Publication	Score		
Publication	PS3	Wii U	Xbox 360
IGN	3.5/10	N/A	N/A
Nintendo Life	N/A	4/10	N/A
PlayStation Official Magazine – Australia	5/10	N/A	N/A
PlayStation Official Magazine – UK	5/10	N/A	N/A
Official Xbox Magazine (UK)	N/A	N/A	2/10
GamingBolt	7.0/10	N/A	N/A
GameOver.gr	N/A	N/A	5/10

IGN panned the game with a score of 3.5 out of 10 saying "This simple, short, and uninteresting game just drops on the deck and flops like a fish." Both the UK and Australian PlayStation Official Magazine were mixed with a 5 out of 10. Official Xbox Magazine UK said the game was "occasionally difficult, never fun."

Nintendo Life in a review for the Wii U release rated it 4 out of 10 calling it an "uninspired, repetitive game that does nothing with the boundlessly bonkers potential of its legendary license." Chris Morris of Common Sense Media rated it 2 out of 5, ending the review stating "this might be a good game for a 5- or 6-year-old, but, as it stands, it's not a good choice for anyone."

GamingBolt gave the game a 7 out of 10, making it the game's only positive review.
