= Plankton and Karen =

SpongeBob SquarePants characters

- SpongeBob SquarePants characters
- Karen (silver mobile form from The SpongeBob SquarePants Movie; left) and Plankton (right)
- First appearance: "Plankton!"; SpongeBob SquarePants; July 31, 1999
- Created by: Stephen Hillenburg
- Designed by: Stephen Hillenburg
- Voiced by: Plankton: Mr. Lawrence; Karen: Jill Talley
- Portrayed by: Plankton: Wesley Taylor (Broadway); Karen: Stephanie Hsu (Broadway)

In-universe information
- Full name: Sheldon J. Plankton Karen Plankton
- Species: Plankton: Copepod; Karen: artificially intelligent supercomputer
- Gender: Male (Plankton); Female (Karen)
- Occupation: Restaurateurs
- Relatives: Plankton: Grand Dad Plankton (grandfather); Granny Plankton (grandmother); Clem (cousin); Unnamed other cousins ("Plankton's Army"); Ma Plankton (mother); Gordon Plankton (father); Karen: EMILP (Emergency Mother-In-Law Program) (mother); Fredrick (father); Chip I (grandfather); Both: Chip Plankton II (son)
- Home: Bikini Bottom, Pacific Ocean

Sheldon J. Plankton and Karen Plankton are a pair of fictional characters and the main antagonists of Nickelodeon's SpongeBob SquarePants franchise. They are voiced by Mr. Lawrence and Jill Talley, respectively. Their first appearance was in the episode "Plankton!", which premiered on July 31, 1999. They were created and designed by the marine biologist and animator Stephen Hillenburg, the creator of the series. Hillenburg named Karen after his wife, Karen Hillenburg (née Umland).

Plankton and Karen are the married owners of the unsuccessful Chum Bucket restaurant. Plankton is an intellectual planktonic, cyclopic copepod, and Karen is a supercomputer. Plankton shares a rivalry with Mr. Krabs, who owns the far more profitable Krusty Krab restaurant which sells a fictional burger called the Krabby Patty. Plankton and Karen often devise schemes to steal the secret Krabby Patty recipe from the Krusty Krab, but their efforts are always thwarted by Krabs and his employees.

Critics have praised the characters’ voices and dialogue together. They began as minor characters, but Lawrence developed their personalities throughout the show's early seasons and they eventually became the franchise's main antagonists. The Planktons play central roles in The SpongeBob SquarePants Movie, which promoted them both to main cast members in its credits, and in the 2015 film. Plankton and Karen are the lead characters in the Netflix feature film Plankton: The Movie, which was released on March 7, 2025.

== Plankton ==
=== Role in SpongeBob SquarePants ===
Sheldon J. Plankton is the nemesis and former best friend of Mr. Krabs. He is the owner of the Chum Bucket, a fast food restaurant located directly across the street from Krabs' restaurant, the Krusty Krab. The Chum Bucket primarily sells chum (bait consisting of fish parts), which is considered mostly inedible by the other characters. As a result, his restaurant is a commercial failure. Plankton's primary goal in the series is to steal the Krabby Patty Secret Formula so he can sell Krabby Patties at the Chum Bucket. His villainous efforts to do this are widely known within the show; fellow character Squidward Tentacles refers to Plankton as "the most hated thing in Bikini Bottom".

A running gag throughout the series is the fact that Plankton is smaller than the other regular characters. He is easily stepped on and sent flying back to the Chum Bucket with a mere flick of the finger. According to Mr. Lawrence, Plankton's small size has led him to develop a Napoleon complex, which is occasionally manifested as a desire for global domination. He is a skillful inventor and regularly builds machines, both to help him in his plots, and for his own personal gain. Although he uses his intellect for evil, Plankton did not start out as a villainous scientist; he built Karen, his first invention, when he was friends with Mr. Krabs in grade school, except in Plankton: The Movie, when he undergoes hypnotherapy (which is also revealed that he was never able to be hypnotized), it was revealed that he made Karen out of a calculator, a roller boot and a potato, but gave her an upgrade in college, with a snarky chip, an evil chip, a smart chip and an empathy chip, the latter of which she removed earlier in the film. Prominent in his earliest appearances, Plankton's catchphrase is "I went to college!" He also has a pet amoeba named Spot who at first was a guard dog, but later became a retriever.

Plankton's roles are not exclusively antagonistic. Outside of business, at least sometimes and mostly in the more recent episodes, he seems to have a somewhat friendly relationship with SpongeBob, despite being technically archenemies but with SpongeBob trying in the meantime to help Plankton find his goodness or good side, usually failing for obvious reasons. In The SpongeBob Movie: Sponge Out of Water, Plankton allies himself with SpongeBob, initially to protect himself from an angry mob, but gradually warms up to SpongeBob throughout the film, which was described by The Guardian as a "buddy film" between Plankton and SpongeBob. Series creator Stephen Hillenburg considered Plankton over the years to be "more of a caricature of a villain" than a truly evil character.

Mr. Lawrence has described Plankton as a "complex, wounded character who is really looking for a friend in a way, but can't let that happen because of his evil front. He carries deep hurt underneath and doesn't want to let anybody know that."

=== Development ===
When SpongeBob SquarePants premiered, Plankton was not part of the series' main cast. Plankton's voice actor, Mr. Lawrence, has stated that after producing Plankton's debut episode in the late 1990s, creator Stephen Hillenburg was unsure if he would continue to use the character. After recording it, Hillenburg was noncommittal, telling Lawrence: "We'll probably do another [Plankton episode] next year," Lawrence summarized Plankton's origins in 2015, saying that he "was only supposed to be in one or two episodes, but I was a writer on the show and I really liked this character". Following his first voice recording as Plankton, Lawrence drafted some of his own ideas for the character and passed them to Hillenburg. From then on, Plankton began to appear more often. Lawrence considers the third season the first in which Plankton is a main character.

During production on SpongeBob's early seasons, Lawrence was the only staff member writing premises and outlines involving Plankton. At the time, he felt he "had to prove Plankton could survive as more than a one-note character". Since then, multiple writers have written for Plankton without Lawrence's involvement, including the teams of writers responsible for Plankton's starring roles in the first two SpongeBob films. Lawrence continues to write Plankton episodes, having said in 2015, "I'm not just his voice. I get to create how the character is written and how he evolves over time."

Preliminary design sketches for Plankton depict him in a robotic suit, with Karen's system built into it; that suit has yet to appear in the series. The suit functioned as a way to increase Plankton's presence, as one of Hillenburg's original intentions was for the character to be too small to see without a magnifying glass. As the series progressed, the animators enlarged Plankton's size, feeling that being microscopic was "not conducive to him interacting with other characters".

==== Voice ====
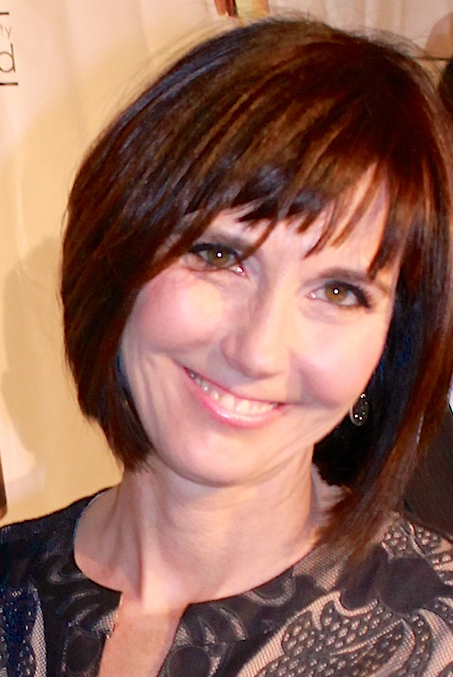
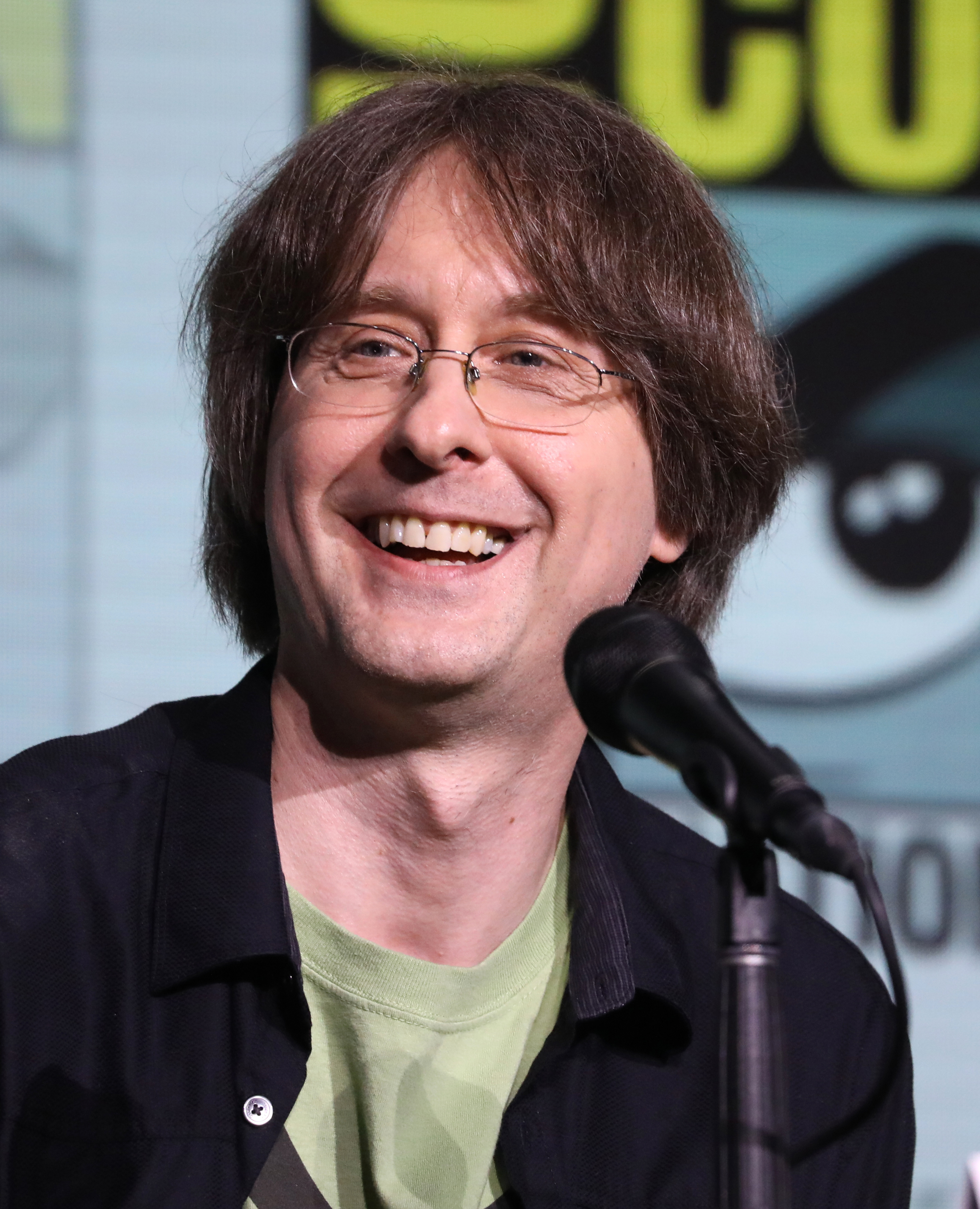
Jill Talley (left) voices Karen, while Mr. Lawrence voices Plankton

Plankton's voice is provided by show writer and actor Doug Lawrence, normally credited as "Mr. Lawrence". The voice originated as an imitation of one of his deep-voiced high school friends. On television, Lawrence first used this voice for incidental characters on Rocko's Modern Life. Fellow voice actor Tom Kenny found it amusing, leading to Lawrence's decision to use it when auditioning for roles on SpongeBob. Lawrence initially tried out for the role of SpongeBob during the series' pre-production, but Stephen Hillenburg wanted a more innocent voice for the character and turned him down. Lawrence continued to work on the show, voicing minor characters, eventually leading to him being offered the role of Plankton in his debut episode, "Plankton!". He describes Plankton's voice as a "combination of Gregory Peck and Tony the Tiger."

When "Plankton!" was pitched to Nickelodeon, Hillenburg had already decided that he wanted Lawrence to play Plankton. However, network executives wanted a guest star to provide his voice since he was set to appear in only one episode. Lawrence mentioned in an interview with fellow SpongeBob actor Thomas F. Wilson that the studio said, in his words, "'we could stunt-cast this. You know, we could have Bruce Willis do this voice.' And Steve [Hillenburg] was just like, 'it's Doug, don't you hear it? This is the character!'"

=== Reception ===
==== Critical response ====
Bettijane Levine of The Los Angeles Times wrote positively of Plankton's portrayal, calling it poignant rather than genuinely immoral, describing him as a "town meanie... but mean is different than evil. There is no evil, not even a sense of menace, in SpongeBob's soggy, safe world." Boston.com writer Jamie Loftus had mixed feelings about Plankton in a 2015 article, asserting that while "almost every episode featuring tiny supervillain Plankton is highly formulaic", he never "gets old".

James Poniewozik of Time magazine commented on Plankton in a 2001 article. He noted that "no one thinks it's strange that the town villain, the megalomaniacal Plankton, is a one-celled organism" as part of the "colorful, goofy" atmosphere of the program. In an article for The A.V. Club, Zack Handlen stated that "the humor of Plankton comes from how his operative ambitions are constantly thwarted by a naïve, trusting kid". In 2015, Entertainment Weekly's Hillary Busis named Plankton one of the most devious characters on television, adding in her commentary that he is "voiced to wicked perfection by Doug Lawrence". José Antonio Gómez Marín of El Mundo favorably compared Plankton's plans to the stories of Georges Simenon in a 2013 article.

In his 2011 book SpongeBob SquarePants and Philosophy, political scientist Joseph J. Foy argues that "Plankton may actually be the unsung hero of the series, and SpongeBob the true villain." He compares the character to the Nietzschean Übermensch, taking note of his mental superiority compared to the other characters in the show, and questions how Plankton is only "judged as bad because, no matter how many great things he accomplishes, his intentions are deemed ignoble". Foy concludes his analysis by criticizing the fact that "SpongeBob is praised as noble for trying to hold Plankton back."

== Karen ==
Karen's original design was a large, immobile monitor on the wall. She was given a mobile form in The SpongeBob SquarePants Movie. During season 9, Karen's mobile form was again used, this time with the addition of a pair of robotic arms.

=== Role in SpongeBob SquarePants ===
Plankton is married to a waterproof computer, Karen, who is also his sidekick and best friend. She is often referred to as Plankton's wife, but according to Plankton, WIFE is an acronym standing for "Wired Integrated Female Electroencephalograph." Karen is Plankton's own invention, assembled from a calculator and a mass of wires. She was Plankton's first invention when he was in grade school, and they dated before he became evil. Her system is built into most of Plankton's machines (including the Chum Bucket itself) so that she and Plankton can communicate while the latter is on a mission. She is a Mark II Surplus UNIVAC with 256 gigabytes of random-access memory.

Karen takes on various jobs at the Chum Bucket, including busser, chef and cashier; she rarely has to fulfill them because of the restaurant's unpopularity. She also tends to stay more focused than Plankton on the core mission of stealing Krabs' formula. Karen often reminds him to stay on task and encourages him to keep going when he loses confidence. Since she lacks a heart, Karen is usually unable to feel empathy for the people around her. Her interactions are not limited to helping Plankton, however; she is a friend of Sandy Cheeks, who is also intelligent and interested in science.

Karen is more competent than Plankton in formulating plots to steal the Krabby Patty recipe. Most of his effective plans have come from Karen, including "Plan Z"—the only scheme to result in Plankton successfully stealing the formula and using it to his advantage—in The SpongeBob SquarePants Movie. Nonetheless, he tends to take credit for them, much to her dismay. Karen has effortlessly stolen Krabs' formula without Plankton's help on many occasions, but her husband always inadvertently gets in the way. Because of their contrasting behaviors, Plankton and Karen have a tendency to argue. Tom Kenny, SpongeBob's voice actor, has called their marriage "Honeymooners-like".

As a computer on the ocean floor, Karen's ability to operate underwater has not been explained in any of the series' episodes. Tom Kenny addressed this in a 2004 interview with the Associated Press, stating that Karen's functionality is a "don't-ask-why" aspect of SpongeBob and that "logic doesn't have a place" in the series' universe. In parodies of fairy tales, such as the season 11 episode "Patnocchio", Karen is depicted wearing a fairy costume.

=== Development ===
Karen was also created by Stephen Hillenburg, who named the character after his wife, Karen Hillenburg (née Umland). Hillenburg initially designed a laboratory for Plankton to convey the character's technological abilities, leading to Karen's development as his lab's central computer system. Like Plankton, she was not initially intended to be a main character; her role in the series grew as Lawrence wrote ideas to give the Planktons more personality. Throughout the series' first and second seasons, Karen is not defined as Plankton's wife; Plankton's official biography from 2000 simply states that he works "with the help of his computer, Karen".

In the series' 3rd-season premiere, "The Algae's Always Greener", Plankton refers to Karen by her name and as his wife for the first time. Aspects of their marriage, like their anniversary and their honeymoon, have become the frequent focus of episodes since then. In early episodes, Karen is always supportive and friendly toward her husband. As the series progresses, she becomes more cynical and sarcastic because of Plankton's relentless obsession with the Krabby Patty formula. However, she remains loving and affectionate toward him.

Many episodes written by Lawrence develop and explore the relationship between Karen and her husband. Lawrence has stated that he feels Karen makes Plankton-focused episodes more humorous and that her presence helps portray him as a multidimensional character. In a 2009 interview with writer Andy Goodman, he said, "I want more Karen on the show ... The married life of an evil genius is the funniest thing to me, so in that regard [Karen] definitely enhances Plankton's stories, making him more than just your typical bad guy.".

For the first three seasons, Karen was usually depicted as a large, blue monitor in the Chum Bucket's laboratory; at other times, only her voice is heard from within Plankton's robotic creations. When Karen was promoted to a main character in The SpongeBob SquarePants Movie, a mobile unit was introduced to allow her to interact more easily with other characters. Showrunner Vincent Waller stated that the mobile unit was introduced because having Karen able to move was more convenient for storytelling purposes. Karen alternates between her multiple forms in most episodes produced after the film. As of the tenth season, her wall monitor is no longer used and her mobile form is always equipped with a pair of robotic arms. In the SpongeBob musical, Karen is depicted as a female human wearing a silver dress and purple wig.

==== Voice ====
Karen is voiced by American actress Jill Talley, who is married to SpongeBob's voice actor, Tom Kenny. Talley, a Chicago native, uses a Midwestern accent for the character. Whenever Karen talks, her voice is mixed over electronic sound effects by the series' audio engineers to create a robotic sound. Her voice, which was more monotonous in earlier episodes, has been described as "deadpan" by the Associated Press. Some of Karen's conversations with Plankton are improvised between Talley and Lawrence. The latter described this improvisation as his "favorite part of the voice over" in 2009. He elaborated in a 2012 interview, saying, "I always enjoy the back-and-forth. [Talley and I] start to actually overlap so much talking to each other that [the voice directors] have to tell us, 'hey, stop doing that, separate what you're saying!'". Lawrence also feels that voicing the characters for so long has built a close relationship between the two actors. On the topic, he said, "This on-TV marriage we have, the whole world knows us being married ... We start becoming a married couple [when recording]."

=== Reception ===
==== Critical response ====
Sandie Angulo Chen of Common Sense Media praised the amount of screen time given to Karen in Sponge Out of Water, calling her "hilarious". In 2015, Boston.com's Jamie Loftus cited Karen as her reason for naming season 2's "Welcome to the Chum Bucket" one of the sixteen greatest SpongeBob episodes. Gizmodo's Ryan Lufkin wrote in 2016 that SpongeBob's "90s-level weirdness" is proven by characters like Plankton and Karen.

In an analysis of how the show has changed throughout its run, Channel Frederator argued that the main characters of SpongeBob–specifically Sandy, Patrick, Mr. Krabs, Squidward and Karen–have been reduced from multidimensional to reliant on single traits. According to this view, "Karen is now a full-blown nag" in newer episodes. This aspect of Karen's character has also been criticized by author Joseph J. Foy, in his book SpongeBob SquarePants and Philosophy. He considers this trope one of several harmful stereotypes present on the program, writing that "the motif of the nagging wife is certainly an issue worthy of dissection in dealing with a young audience, along with the spoiled teen daughter [Pearl] and the stupid best friend [Patrick]".

Lampooning a controversy surrounding SpongeBob's sexuality, essayist Dennis Hans wrote a 2005 satirical piece for the National Catholic Reporter focusing on the marriage of Plankton and Karen. He remarked, in jest, that SpongeBob's sexual orientation was a lesser issue compared to the positive representation of Plankton's "technosexuality". Hans identified instances where both Planktons were portrayed as a loving couple and joked: "the subliminal message from SpongeBob's insidious creators ... [is that] the technosexual lifestyle means bonding forever with your one true love".

== In other media ==
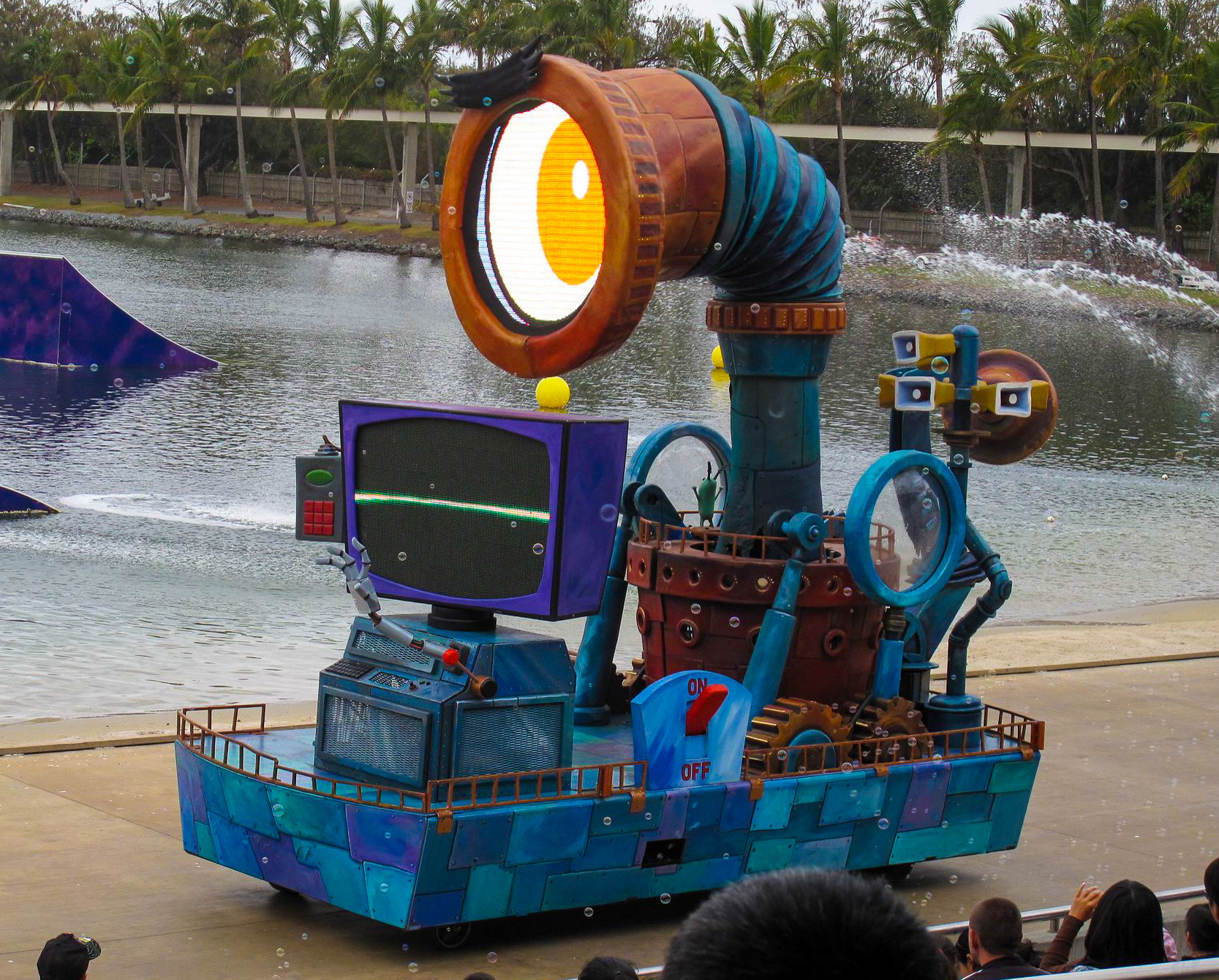
A float featuring Plankton and Karen at Sea World in Southport, Queensland

Plankton and Karen have been featured in various forms of SpongeBob SquarePants merchandise, including video games and action figures. In 2006, Ty Inc.'s Beanie Babies introduced a plush toy based on Plankton. A Lego building set based on the Chum Bucket, including a Plankton minifigure and his laboratory with Karen, was released in 2007. The fourteenth issue of SpongeBob Comics, titled "Plankton Comics", is centered around the Planktons and includes six original stories set at the Chum Bucket. The 2013 video game Plankton's Robotic Revenge is Plankton-themed and features Lawrence and Jill Talley reprising their voice roles from the show as Plankton and Karen. Plankton and Karen appear in several Nickelodeon crossover works, including 2005's Nicktoons Unite! game its sequel Nicktoons: Globs of Doom, and the 2023 fighting game Nickelodeon All-Star Brawl 2. All three games feature the Chum Bucket as an in-game stage and in the latter two, Plankton is a player character. Additionally, Plankton and Karen are both mentioned by Eric Lange (as his character Sikowitz) in "Tori Goes Platinum," an episode of Nickelodeon's sitcom Victorious.

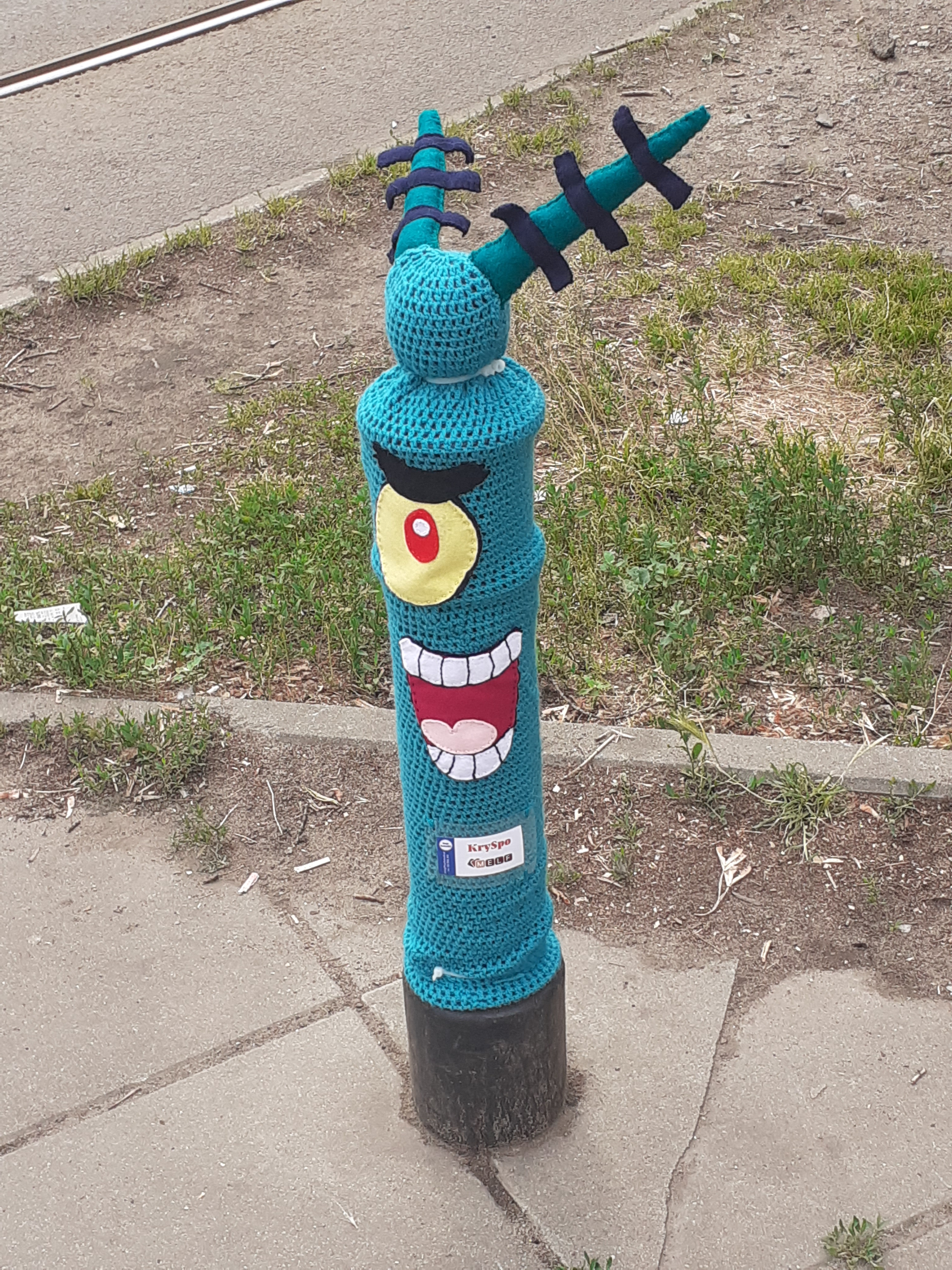
Plankton street art in Warsaw, Poland

Sea World Australia's "SpongeBob ParadePants" event, which opened in December 2011, included a float featuring Karen and a talking Plankton. In 2015, a recreation of Plankton's laboratory was constructed for a SpongeBob event at the Chiang Kai-shek Memorial Hall in Zhongzheng District, Taipei. It included a replica of Karen's monitor, functioning as a television, screening episodes of SpongeBob, and a miniature Plankton statue.

The Flaming Lips' song "SpongeBob and Patrick Confront the Psychic Wall of Energy", recorded for The SpongeBob SquarePants Movie, closes with several lines about Plankton and Karen. The song characterizes Plankton as a confused faultfinder who would be much happier if he stopped focusing on his failures and complaining to Karen. Plankton sings a track on the novelty album The Best Day Ever titled "You Will Obey", on which Elvis Presley's former guitarist James Burton played guitar. Of the album, Tom Kenny said "one of our hidden Easter eggs that hopefully more than three people in the world will get is during the guitar solo when Plankton says 'Take it, James', which was what Elvis said in every one of those concert movies". Film composer John Debney produced Plankton's theme music for the second SpongeBob film, using trombones. The film's score includes several tracks named after Plankton, including "Plankton Rescues Karen", which is used during a scene highlighting Plankton's cooperation with hero SpongeBob.

Plankton and Karen are the main antagonists in the show's Broadway adaptation. They were portrayed by Wesley Taylor and Stephanie Hsu. In addition to wearing costumes inspired by the characters, Taylor and Hsu are accompanied by a Plankton puppet and a replica of Karen's mobile form, respectively. The two also sing a musical number titled "When the Going Gets Tough" (composed by T.I.). The plot features them attempting to hypnotize the residents of Bikini Bottom into liking the food they serve at the Chum Bucket.
