= SpongeBob SquarePants season 10 =

Season of television series

SpongeBob SquarePants
- Season 10
- DVD cover
- Showrunners: Marc Ceccarelli; Vincent Waller
- Starring: Tom Kenny; Bill Fagerbakke; Rodger Bumpass; Clancy Brown; Mr. Lawrence; Jill Talley; Carolyn Lawrence; Mary Jo Catlett; Lori Alan
- No. of episodes: 11 (22 segments)

Release
- Original network: Nickelodeon
- Original release: October 15, 2016 – December 2, 2017

Season chronology
- ← Previous; Season 9 Next → Season 11

The tenth season of the American animated television series SpongeBob SquarePants, created by marine biologist and animator Stephen Hillenburg, aired on Nickelodeon in the United States from October 15, 2016, to December 2, 2017. The series chronicles the exploits and adventures of the title character and his various friends in the fictional underwater city of Bikini Bottom. This season, which opened with "Whirly Brains" and finished airing with "The Incredible Shrinking Sponge", is the shortest in the show's history, containing 11 half-hours only instead of the usual length of 26.

The season was first announced on May 21, 2012. It was executive produced by Hillenburg, and was the first season of the show not to involve long-time crew member and former showrunner Paul Tibbitt. The showrunners for this season were Marc Ceccarelli and Vincent Waller, who also acted as supervising producers.

The show received several accolades during the run of its tenth season, including the 2017 Kids' Choice Award for Favorite Cartoon. The series was also nominated in various international versions of the Kids' Choice for the same category. Similarly, the show was nominated for a BAFTA Children's Award (Kids' Vote for Television), which it lost to The Next Step. The SpongeBob SquarePants: The Complete Tenth Season DVD was released in region 1 on October 15, 2019, and region 4 on October 7, 2020.

== Production ==
The season aired on Nickelodeon, which is owned by Viacom, and was produced by United Plankton Pictures and Nickelodeon Animation Studio. The season's only executive producer was series creator Stephen Hillenburg, who was announced to have returned to the series in January 2015. This is the first season since the fifth that former showrunner and long-time crew member Paul Tibbitt did not work on as an executive producer, and the first in the show's history without Tibbitt's involvement. The season is also the first to be run completely by Waller and Marc Ceccarelli, who had replaced Tibbitt as showrunners during the ninth season. Prior to this, Waller served as the creative director and an occasional writer and storyboard director of the series, while Ceccarelli served as a staff writer and storyboard director (and eventually, the series' animatic director). Ben Gruber, the co-creator of Adult Swim's Superjail!, joined the team of writers for this season.

In September 2013, it was reported that the tenth season was in production and expected to air in 2014; however, season nine was elongated into and past that year, due to production of The SpongeBob Movie: Sponge Out of Water.

During production of the season, Hillenburg disclosed that he was diagnosed with amyotrophic lateral sclerosis, a terminal illness that affects and causes the death of neurons that control the brain and the spinal cord. He released a statement to the Variety magazine after his diagnosis, in which he affirmed that he would continue to work on SpongeBob SquarePants "for as long as [he is] able." He stated further, "My family and I are grateful for the outpouring of love and support. We ask that our sincere request for privacy be honored during this time." At the time, Hillenburg was in the early stages of the disease, according to a source close to him. He later died of the illness on November 26, 2018, during production of the series' twelfth season.

== Cast ==
The tenth season features Tom Kenny as the voice of the title character SpongeBob SquarePants and his pet snail Gary. Kenny also played a number of incidental roles, including Prickles the worm, a guest character who has a major role in "House Worming". SpongeBob's greedy and money-obsessed employer at the Krusty Krab, Mr. Krabs, is voiced by Clancy Brown. Rodger Bumpass played the voice of Squidward Tentacles, an arrogant and ill-tempered octopus, while SpongeBob's best friend Patrick Star is voiced by Bill Fagerbakke. Other members of the cast are Mr. Lawrence as Plankton, Mr. Krabs' business rival; Jill Talley as Karen, Plankton's sentient computer sidekick; Carolyn Lawrence as Sandy Cheeks, a squirrel from Texas; Mary Jo Catlett as Mrs. Puff, SpongeBob's boating school teacher; and Lori Alan as Pearl, a teenage whale who is Mr. Krabs' daughter.

In addition to the regular cast members, episodes feature guest voices from many ranges of professions, including actors, musicians, and artists. For instance, former Screen Actors Guild president Ed Asner voiced the grumpy old fish in "Whirly Brains". J. K. Simmons voiced Maestro Mackerel, a conductor with a short temper, in "Snooze You Lose". Mackerel is a nod to the abusive music instructor Terence Fletcher in the 2014 film Whiplash, a role for which Simmons won the Academy Award for Best Supporting Actor. Seinfeld actor John O'Hurley, who had previously voiced King Neptune in season 1's "Neptune's Spatula" and season 6's "The Clash of Triton", reprised his role for "Trident Trouble". Steve Buscemi and Joe Pantoliano guest star in "The Getaway" as two crooks. This is the first season not to feature guest appearances from Ernest Borgnine and Tim Conway as the superheroes Mermaid Man and Barnacle Boy; Borgnine died during production of the previous season, so their characters were retired and limited to non-speaking cameo appearances for later season 9 episodes and onwards.

== Reception ==
The season has received generally positive reviews from media critics. During the run of the tenth season, SpongeBob SquarePants received several awards and nominations. At the 2017 Kids' Choice Awards, the program won its fourteenth award for Favorite Cartoon. The program also received a pending nomination at the British Academy Children's Awards for the International category, which it lost.

== Episodes ==
The tenth season of SpongeBob SquarePants consists of 11 episodes (22 segments, 1 short), which are ordered below according to Nickelodeon's packaging order, and not their original production or broadcast order. It is the shortest season, lacking the usual 26-episode length.

No. overall	No. in season	Title	Directed by (Note: Information is taken from the opening credits of each episode.) (Note: Adam Paloian did not use the supervising director title in his episodes at first. Instead, he used the title "storyboard supervisor" up until episode 213a, where he is credited as a supervising director from then on.)	Written by	Original release date	Prod. code	U.S. viewers (millions)
205	1	"Whirly Brains"	Bob Jaques (animation), Sherm Cohen (supervising)	Written by : Mr. Lawrence; Storyboarded by : Fred Osmond	October 15, 2016	325–1001	1.77
205	1	"Mermaid Pants"	Alan Smart (animation), Dave Cunningham (supervising)	Written by : Kaz; Storyboarded by : John Trabbic	October 29, 2016	325–1002	2.17
"Whirly Brains": SpongeBob and Patrick buy a popular toy, where the user detaches their brain from their head, then flies it around as a drone. A cranky old man kidnaps all the brains, so SpongeBob and Patrick get Sandy's help to confront him. "Mermaid Pants": SpongeBob and Patrick have fun pretending to be Mermaid Man and Barnacle Boy. Mr. Krabs, secretly a fan of the series, has him and Squidward play along as supervillains.
206	2	"Unreal Estate"	Tom Yasumi (animation), Adam Paloian (storyboard supervision)	Written by : Ben Gruber; Storyboarded by : Brian Morante	June 3, 2017	325–1004	1.69
206	2	"Code Yellow"	Tom Yasumi (animation), Dave Cunningham (supervising)	Written by : Andrew Goodman; Storyboarded by : John Trabbic	June 3, 2017	325–1005	1.69
"Unreal Estate": Squidward tricks SpongeBob into fearing that he has become allergic to his pineapple. When Squidward takes SpongeBob to find a new house, he ends up coming across one that he wants instead, and tries to convince SpongeBob not to buy it. "Code Yellow": Squidward goes to get a nose job at the hospital. SpongeBob is mistaken for a doctor, and has to help various patients, culminating in Squidward's nose surgery.
207	3	"Mimic Madness"	Bob Jaques (animation), Adam Paloian (storyboard supervision)	Written by : Mr. Lawrence; Storyboarded by : Brian Morante	February 25, 2017	325–1007	2.12
207	3	"House Worming"	Alan Smart (animation), Sherm Cohen (supervising)	Written by : Richard Pursel; Storyboarded by : Fred Osmond	February 25, 2017	325–1003	2.12
"Mimic Madness": Upon learning that "imitation is the sincerest form of flattery" from Squidward, SpongeBob impresses his friends through impressions of them. He becomes so obsessed with impressions that he loses his own identity, and SpongeBob's friends need to imitate him to remind him who he is. "House Worming": SpongeBob takes pity on a worm and allows it to live in his body. However, the worm takes advantage and invites many of his friends over, resulting in SpongeBob becoming infested with worms, unable to get rid of them. Short: Prickles the Worm in: Clam Up!
208	4	"Snooze You Lose"	Alan Smart (animation), Adam Paloian (supervising)	Written by : Kaz; Storyboarded by : Fred Osmond	March 4, 2017	325–1008	2.12
208	4	"Krusty Katering"	Tom Yasumi (animation), Dave Cunningham (supervising)	Written by : Ben Gruber; Storyboarded by : John Trabbic	March 4, 2017	325–1010	2.12
"Snooze You Lose": Squidward has a clarinet recital and finds himself unable to sleep. When he passes out in SpongeBob's house, SpongeBob and Patrick are unable to wake him up. They go inside Squidward's body and get him to the recital, managing to play the clarinet beautifully. Squidward wakes up and regains control of his body, failing the recital with his awful playing. "Krusty Katering": Mr. Krabs, SpongeBob, Patrick, and Squidward cater at a kids' birthday party. When it goes wrong, they pretend to be high-class caterers and attend a fancy party. Patrick becomes obsessive over the food, Mr. Krabs is followed around by a boy from the birthday party, Squidward tries to join a musical quartet, and SpongeBob makes the Krabby Patties more fancy. Note: This episode was dedicated to former music composer Barry Anthony Trop.
209	5	"SpongeBob's Place"	Tom Yasumi (animation), Adam Paloian (storyboard supervision)	Written by : Kaz; Storyboarded by : Kelly Armstrong	March 11, 2017	325–1006	2.27
209	5	"Plankton Gets the Boot"	Tom Yasumi (animation), Sherm Cohen (supervising)	Written by : Ben Gruber; Storyboarded by : Fred Osmond	March 11, 2017	325–1011	2.27
"SpongeBob's Place": Squidward insists that SpongeBob is the only reason why the Krusty Krab is popular. Out of jealousy, Mr. Krabs kicks SpongeBob out of the restaurant, where he starts his own restaurant at home. The Krusty Krab fails as Mr. Krabs tries to re-attract customers, while SpongeBob's restaurant becomes a success. "Plankton Gets the Boot": Karen is angry at Plankton's uncaring and unappreciative nature, kicking him out of the restaurant until he can improve himself. SpongeBob and Patrick try to teach Plankton how to be a nicer person.
210	6	"Life Insurance"	Bob Jaques (animation), Adam Paloian (storyboard supervision)	Written by : Kaz; Storyboarded by : Brian Morante	March 18, 2017	325–1012	2.13
210	6	"Burst Your Bubble"	Alan Smart (animation), Dave Cunningham (supervising)	Written by : Andrew Goodman; Storyboarded by : John Trabbic	March 18, 2017	325–1013	2.13
"Life Insurance": SpongeBob and Patrick buy life insurance, and believe that it means they cannot get injured. A series of lucky coincidences convinces Squidward as well. When Mr. Krabs explains what life insurance really means, SpongeBob and Patrick try to tell Squidward as he attempts a dangerous obstacle course. "Burst Your Bubble": Unable to earn a license for a real boat, SpongeBob creates his own boat out of bubbles. These become popular around town, and Mrs. Puff is forced to attend SpongeBob's "Bubble Boating School."
211	7	"Plankton Retires"	Bob Jaques (timing), (Note: So far, this is the only episode that has not used the animation director credit. Instead, Jaques is credited as a timing director.) Sherm Cohen (supervising)	Written by : Mr. Lawrence; Storyboarded by : Fred Osmond	March 25, 2017	325–1014	2.07
211	7	"Trident Trouble"	Tom Yasumi (animation), Dave Cunningham (supervising)	Written by : Ben Gruber; Storyboarded by : John Trabbic	March 25, 2017	325–1015	2.07
"Plankton Retires": After many failures, Plankton closes the Chum Bucket and starts a new life in a faraway town. SpongeBob and Mr. Krabs, who does not believe that Plankton has truly changed, follow him. "Trident Trouble": SpongeBob and King Neptune swap their spatula and trident. Neptune is unable to fight a kraken using SpongeBob's spatula and tries to find his trident, while SpongeBob uses the trident to grant wishes that end up backfiring.
212	8	"The Incredible Shrinking Sponge"	Alan Smart (animation), Adam Paloian (storyboard supervision)	Written by : Mr. Lawrence; Storyboarded by : Brian Morante	December 2, 2017	325–1018	1.83
212	8	"Sportz?"	Bob Jaques (animation), Dave Cunningham (supervising)	Written by : Andrew Goodman; Storyboarded by : John Trabbic	July 16, 2017	325–1016	1.99
"The Incredible Shrinking Sponge": SpongeBob turns up the temperature on the grill, but shrinks from the heat. At his tiny size, he confronts an urchin, is mistaken for an action figure by a group of kids, and is hired as a personal hygienist. "Sportz?": SpongeBob and Patrick find Sandy's box of sports equipment, but do not know how to play the sports. As revenge, Squidward teaches them incorrect and painful ways to play. Sandy eventually finds out, and beats Squidward at his own game.
213	9	"The Getaway"	Alan Smart (animation), Adam Paloian (supervising)	Written by : Kaz; Storyboarded by : Brian Morante	June 10, 2017	325–1017	1.66
213	9	"Lost and Found"	Tom Yasumi (animation), Sherm Cohen (supervising)	Written by : Dani Michaeli; Storyboarded by : Fred Osmond	June 10, 2017	325–1019	1.66
"The Getaway": An escaped criminal, Stickyfins, convinces SpongeBob that he is his driving instructor. Mrs. Puff, the police, and Stickyfins' original driver Dorsal Dan chase after them. SpongeBob and Stickyfins get into all sorts of wacky and violent robbery hi-jinx around Bikini Bottom, while Dorsal Dan and Mrs. Puff romantically flirt with each other while chasing them.: Guest stars: Joe Pantoliano as Stickyfins and Steve Buscemi as Dorsal Dan; "Lost and Found": Mr. Krabs sends SpongeBob into the Krusty Krab's underground lost-and-found to find a child's missing toy. There, he meets a group of old people who have gotten lost years ago.
214	10	"Patrick's Coupon"	Tom Yasumi (animation), Dave Cunningham (supervising)	Written by : Kaz; Storyboarded by : Kelly Armstrong	June 17, 2017	325–1021	1.77
214	10	"Out of the Picture"	Alan Smart (animation), Sherm Cohen (supervising)	Written by : Ben Gruber; Storyboarded by : Fred Osmond	June 17, 2017	325–1020	1.77
"Patrick's Coupon": Patrick finds a coupon for a free ice cream cone, and wants to redeem it for SpongeBob. When he arrives at the ice cream store, Patrick learns that the coupon is expired, and must negotiate with the Ice Cream King – who both looks and acts very similar to him – to get the ice cream. "Out of the Picture": Mr. Krabs buys Squidward's paintings, and learns from an appraiser that art is worth more after the artist has died. Mr. Krabs makes Squidward go on increasingly dangerous deliveries to get rid of him.
215	11	"Feral Friends"	Alan Smart (animation), Dave Cunningham (supervising)	Written by : Mr. Lawrence; Storyboarded by : Brian Morante	October 7, 2017	325–1009	1.81
215	11	"Don't Wake Patrick"	Tom Yasumi (animation), Adam Paloian (supervising)	Written by : Brian Morante and Mr. Lawrence; Storyboarded by : Brian Morante	October 7, 2017	325–1022	1.81
"Feral Friends": Sandy's birthday party is interrupted by Neptune's Moon, a rare phenomenon that causes underwater animals to revert to a primal, realistic state. As a land creature, Sandy is the only one not affected, and must keep her friends safe from the now monstrously-large Squidward and Pearl. "Don't Wake Patrick": Patrick sleepwalks into SpongeBob's house. Unable to wake Patrick up, SpongeBob has to guide him out of danger as he goes around town.

== DVD release ==
The DVD boxset for season ten was released by Paramount Home Entertainment and Nickelodeon in the United States and Canada on October 15, 2019. This is the only DVD set so far to not include any bonus features.

SpongeBob SquarePants: The Complete Tenth Season
Set details			Special features
11 episodes (22 segment episodes); 2-disc set; 1.78:1 aspect ratio; Languages: English (Dolby Digital 5.1); Spanish (Dolby Stereo); French (Dolby Stereo)			
Release dates
Region 1	Region 2	Region 4	
October 15, 2019	TBA	October 7, 2020	
Episodes
Disc 1: "Whirly Brains", "Mermaid Pants", "Unreal Estate", "Code Yellow", "Mimic Madness", "House Worming", "Snooze You Lose", "Krusty Katering", "SpongeBob's Place", "Plankton Gets the Boot", "Life Insurance", "Burst Your Bubble", "Plankton Retires", and "Trident Trouble"; Disc 2: "The Incredible Shrinking Sponge", "Sportz?", "The Getaway", "Lost and Found", "Patrick's Coupon", "Out of the Picture", "Feral Friends", and "Don't Wake Patrick"
