= Stunt casting =

Casting gimmick

Stunt casting is the use of a gimmick or publicity stunt to fill a role in a television series, film, or theatre production. The casting itself can range broadly, from a non-actor celebrity, a glorified cameo appearance, to real-life relatives portraying fictional family members.

== Purpose ==
Stunt casting is used to generate media attention. It may also be employed to garner studio support or financing for a project. For example, according to DVD featurette commentary, the 1978 version of Superman received studio support only after the producers were able to enlist A-list actors Marlon Brando and Gene Hackman to appear.

== In musical theatre ==
Broadway musicals occasionally cast celebrities (typically from television, film, or pop music) with little theatre experience. Celebrities are often cast for short engagements of a few months, with the hope that the draw of a recognizable name will boost ticket sales and extend the lifetime of a show's run. Producers Barry and Fran Weissler are notable pioneers of the trend, beginning in the mid-1990s with their 1994 revival of Grease. The role of Betty Rizzo was originally played by Rosie O'Donnell (then best known as an actor on television and in film), and during the production's four-year run, was played by a series of celebrities including Debby Boone, Sheena Easton, Joely Fisher, Debbie Gibson, Linda Blair, and Brooke Shields. The Weisslers' 1996 revival of Chicago has been especially noted for its celebrity casting over the years, including Melanie Griffith, Wendy Williams, Jerry Springer, and Pamela Anderson, which has likely contributed to the show's extreme longevity (still running in 2024, and the longest-running revival on Broadway). Barry Weissler attributed the success of stunt casting to its effectiveness with tourists visiting New York City, who are less influenced by reviews and more interested in seeing "a star that they know". Celebrity casting is especially prevalent during the summer, with its higher volume of tourists.

== See also ==
- Celebrity branding
- Foreword – a book introduction, sometimes written by a celebrity whose name appears on the cover with the main author's
- Guest appearance – temporary appearance by a notable person in a show
- Typecasting, also described there is the opposite of typecasting, casting against type, which can have similarities to stunt casting
