= Jill Talley =

American voice actress

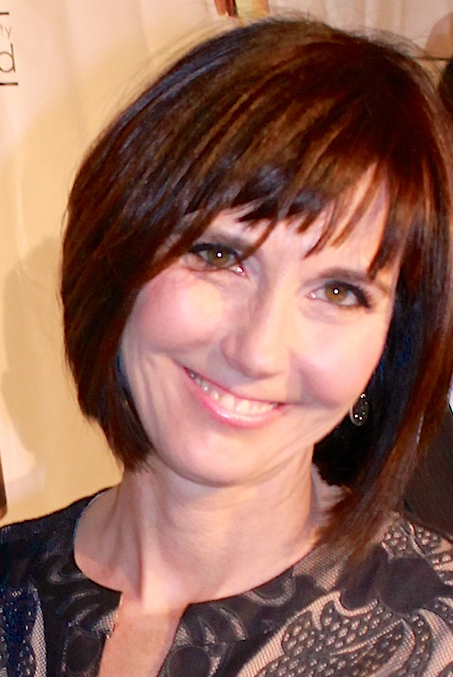
- Talley at the 2014 41st Annie Awards
- Born: December 19, 1962 (age 63); Chicago, Illinois, U.S.
- Other names: Jill Tally; Jill Kenny
- Education: Kennedy High School
- Occupation: Voice actress
- Years active: 1984–present
- Spouse: Tom Kenny (m. 1996)
- Children: 2

Jill Talley (born December 19, 1962) is an American voice actress. She is a main cast member on the animated series SpongeBob SquarePants, in which she voices Karen Plankton. Her other voice roles include Sarah Dubois on Adult Swim's The Boondocks, Nosey on Rocko's Modern Life and Rocko's Modern Life: Static Cling, and Rita Loud on The Loud House. She is married to Tom Kenny, a co-star from SpongeBob SquarePants.

== Early life ==
Talley was born in Chicago, Illinois on December 19, 1962. She graduated from Kennedy High School in 1981.

== Career ==
In her twenties, Talley performed improv comedy in Chicago at the Improv Institute and The Second City. Talley and her husband, Tom Kenny, were both cast members of the cult short-lived FOX Network sketch comedy show The Edge from 1992 to 1993 and sketch comedy show Mr. Show from 1995 to 1998. During 1996, they also appeared together in the music video for The Smashing Pumpkins's song "Tonight, Tonight" as a married couple who take a honeymoon on the moon.

Since 1999, Jill Talley has played Karen Plankton on SpongeBob SquarePants. She was promoted to a main cast member in the credits of its 2004 film adaptation. Talley's other vocal work includes playing several characters on Camp Lazlo (Gretchen, Nina, and Ms. Mucus) and playing Sarah Dubois on the Adult Swim show The Boondocks. She also voiced Lady Granite in the Plastic Man DC Nation Shorts and Maja the Sky Witch in the Adventure Time episode "Sky Witch”.

Since Mr. Show's run, she has also appeared in minor roles in several films such as Little Miss Sunshine and Sky High, in the latter of which she appeared with her husband.

== Personal life ==
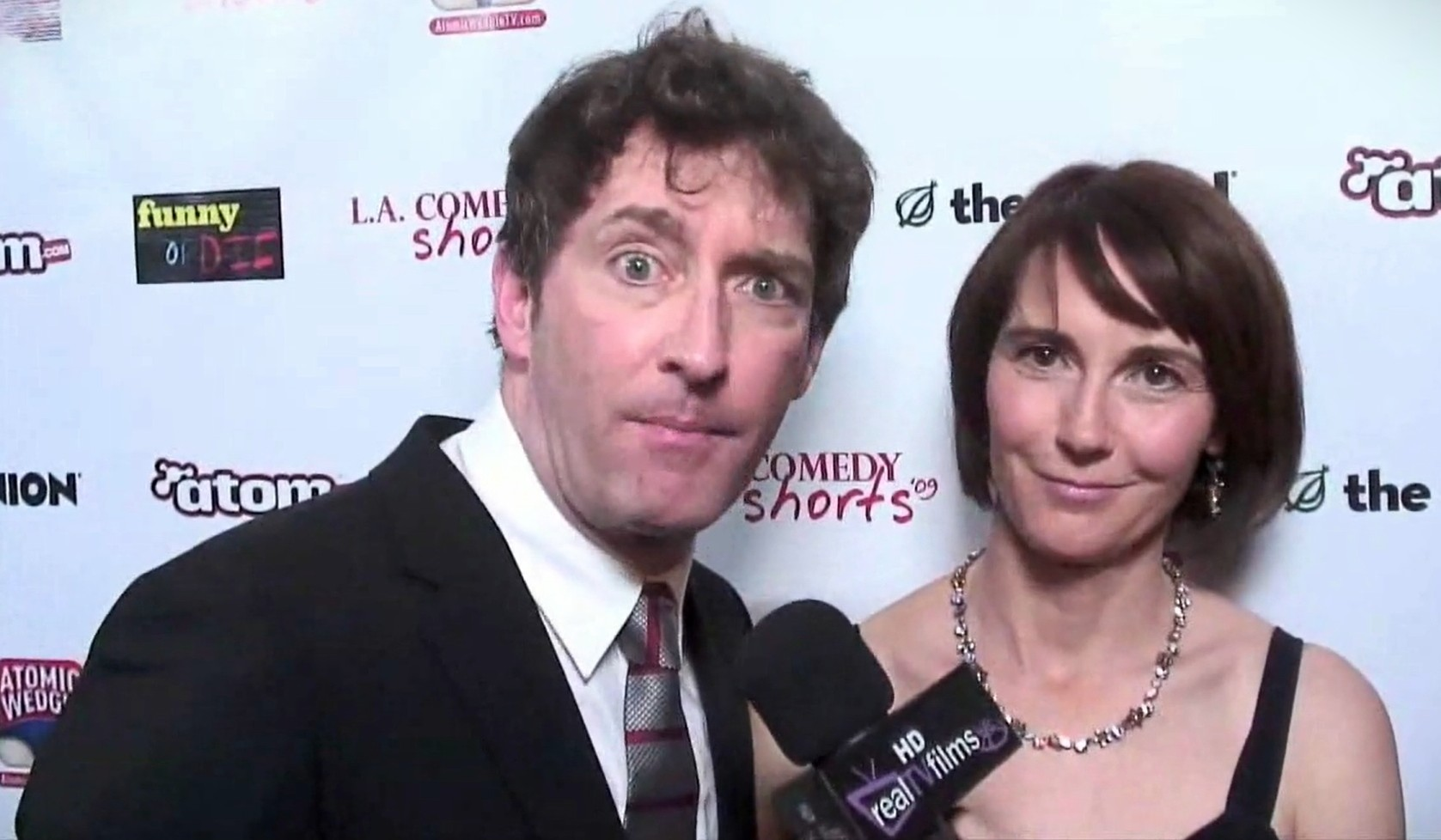
Tom Kenny and Jill Talley in 2009

Talley first met Tom Kenny in 1992 while working on The Edge. They married in 1996 and have two children, Mack (b. 1997) and Nora (b. 2003).

== Filmography ==
=== Film ===
Year	Title	Role	Notes
1998	Sour Grapes	Lois	
2000	The Ladies Man	Candy	
2002	The Powerpuff Girls Movie	Additional characters (voice)	Uncredited
2002	Run Ronnie Run	Tammy	
2003	Dumb and Dumberer: When Harry Met Lloyd	Mom	
2003	The Animatrix	Mother (voice)	Segment: "The Second Renaissance"
2004	The SpongeBob SquarePants Movie	Karen Plankton, Old Lady (voices)	
2005	Sky High	Mrs. Timmerman	
2005	Lil' Pimp	Mom, Old Lady, Mary (voice)	
2005	Here Comes Peter Cottontail: The Movie	Mama Cottontail, Mother (voice)	
2006	Little Miss Sunshine	Cindy	
2006	Asterix and the Vikings	Walla-Female (voice)	English dub
2006	Barnyard	Snotty Boy's Mom (voice)	
2007	Happily N'Ever After	Stepsister, Mother, Witch (voice)	
2007	Elf Bowling the Movie: The Great North Pole Elf Strike	Grizelda Claus, Veronica Kim (voice)	
2009	World's Greatest Dad	Make-up Woman	
2015	The SpongeBob Movie: Sponge Out of Water	Karen, Various (voices) (voice)	
2019	Rocko's Modern Life: Static Cling	Nosey, additional voices	
2020	The SpongeBob Movie: Sponge on the Run	Karen (voice)	
2021	The Loud House Movie	Rita Loud, 1600's Rita (voice)	
2024	No Time to Spy: A Loud House Movie	Rita Loud, Computer Voice (voice)	
2024	Saving Bikini Bottom: The Sandy Cheeks Movie	Karen, Bonnie, Various (voice)	
2025	Plankton: The Movie	Karen, Various (voice)	
2025	A Loud House Christmas Movie: Naughty or Nice	Rita Loud, Astronaut #2 (voice)	
2025	The SpongeBob Movie: Search for SquarePants	Judgy Girl (voice)	

=== Television ===
Year	Title	Role	Notes
1992–1993	The Edge	Various characters	Main role; 20 episodes
1995	Rocko's Modern Life	Nosey (voice)	Episode: "Speaking Terms"
1995–1998	Mr. Show with Bob and David	Various	26 episodes
1996–1997	Seinfeld	Gail	2 episodes
1998–1999	Cow and Chicken	Various voices	2 episodes
1999–present	SpongeBob SquarePants	Karen Plankton, various characters (voice)	Main cast
2000–2003	The Powerpuff Girls	Additional characters (voice)	Recurring role; 22 episodes
2001	Johnny Bravo	Various voices	2 episodes
2003	Clifford's Puppy Days	Mrs. Sidarsky, Bebe (voice)	3 episodes
2003–2004	Stripperella	Giselle, Margo Van Winkle, and Enorma Ray (voice)	Main role; 13 episodes
2004–2005	The Grim Adventures of Billy & Mandy	Jason and his mom, Nerd Girl, Sperg's Mom (voice)	2 episodes
2004–2005	Duck Dodgers	Edna Wheely, Mrs. Wiggums, Unice (voice)	2 episodes
2005	What's New, Scooby-Doo?	Frida Flora (voice)	Episode: "Farmed and Dangerous"
2005	Codename: Kids Next Door	Billy's Mom, Mrs. Dirt (voice)	2 episodes
2005–2008	Camp Lazlo	Gretchen, Miss Mucus, Nina Neckley (voice)	Main role; 15 episodes
2005–present	American Dad!	Additional characters (voice)	Recurring role; 11 episodes
2005–2014	The Boondocks	Sarah Dubois / Various characters (voice)	Main role; 46 episodes
2007	The Batman	Socialite, Doctor (voice)	Episode: "Vertigo"
2007	WordGirl	Babysitter (voice)	Episode: "Tobey or Consequences"
2012–2018	Adventure Time	Maja, various characters (voice)	4 episodes
2014–2016	TripTank	Mom, Woman, Operator, Pierced Gypsy, Goddess on a Horse, Veronica, Sharleen, News Reporter, and Bride (voice)	Recurring role; 9 episodes
2015	W/ Bob & David	Various characters	Recurring role; 5 episodes
2016–present	The Loud House	Rita Loud, Griselda, Sam Sharp (1st time), Spunk E. Pigeon, Fenton, Kelly, various characters (voice)	Main role
2016–2018	Skylanders Academy	Roller Brawl (voice)	Recurring role
2016–2019	The Powerpuff Girls	Psychic Woman, Ms. Lacosi, Super Lice 1, Judge and Duplikate (voice)	Recurring role
2017–2019	Wacky Races	I.Q. Ickly, P.T. Barnstorm (voice)	Main role
2017–2023	Puppy Dog Pals	Cupcake, Jackie (voice)	Recurring role
2018	Rise of the Teenage Mutant Ninja Turtles	Cheery Tomato (voice)	Episode: "War and Pizza"
2018	Bobcat Goldthwait's Misfits & Monsters	Alice Faustini	Episode: "Devil in the Blue Jeans"
2019	Love, Death & Robots	Kali (voice)	Episode: "Blind Spot"
2019	Green Eggs and Ham	Various characters (voice)	4 episodes
2019–2020	Tigtone	Koledra-Scoptor, Rain-Bone, Horned Pegasus, Peasant 2 and Ugly Creature 2 (voice)	2 episodes
2020	The Casagrandes	Rita Loud (voice)	Episode: "Cursed!"
2020–2021	T.O.T.S.	Various characters (voice)	Recurring role; 6 episodes
2021–2024	Kamp Koral: SpongeBob's Under Years	Karen Plankton (voice)	Main role
2021–present	The Patrick Star Show	Squidina Star, Karen Plankton (voice)	Main role
2021–2022	Chicago Party Aunt	Bonnie (voice)	Recurring role
2025	A Man on the Inside	Holly Bodgemark	Recurring role; 7 episodes

=== Video games ===
Year	Title	Voice role	Notes	Source
2002	La Pucelle: Tactics	Culotte	English dub	
2003	Arc the Lad: Twilight of the Spirits	Paulette	English dub	
2003	Final Fantasy X-2	Incidental characters	English dub	
2004	EverQuest II	Generic Iksar Ghost Enemy, Generic Siren Enemy, Generic Valkyrie Enemy		
2005	SpongeBob SquarePants: Lights, Camera, Pants!	Karen Plankton		
2005	The SpongeBob SquarePants Movie: The Video Game	Karen		
2006	SpongeBob SquarePants: Creature from the Krusty Krab	Karen		
2006	Final Fantasy XII	Additional characters	English dub	
2006	Metal Gear Solid: Portable Ops	Female Soldier B	English dub	
2009	SpongeBob's Truth or Square	Karen, additional characters		
2010	Final Fantasy XIII	Cocoon Inhabitants	English dub	
2013	SpongeBob SquarePants: Plankton's Robotic Revenge	Karen, Rainchild		
2013	Lightning Returns: Final Fantasy XIII	Additional voices	English dub	
2022	Nickelodeon Kart Racers 3: Slime Speedway	Squidina Star		
2023	SpongeBob SquarePants: The Cosmic Shake	Karen, Citizens		
2025	Nicktoons & The Dice of Destiny	Karen, Barks		
2025	SpongeBob SquarePants: Titans of the Tide	Karen, Captain Goldie, Citizens, Kids		
