= Merysha Chandra =

Indonesian actress, voice actress, singer, model, narrator, and occupation

- Born: February 28, 1970 (age 56); Bandung, West Java, Indonesia
- Occupations: Actress, voice actress, singer, model, narrator, various others
- Years active: 1991–present

Merysha Chandra (born February 28, 1970) is an Indonesian actress, voice actress, singer, model, narrator, and various others who has been dubbing for foreign productions such as cartoons, anime and live action films into the Indonesian language. She can dub for young boys, as well as for various aged female roles.

== Voice roles ==
=== Dubbing ===
==== Television anime ====
- Doraemon – Shizuka Minamoto (2009–2013)
- Inazuma Eleven – Additional Voices
- Ninja Hattori-kun – Kanzo Hattori (Spacetoon)
- XX BOM Fighter – Additional Voices

==== Television animation ====
- SpongeBob SquarePants – SpongeBob SquarePants (2004–2006), (Season 1-Season 3), (Lativi) & (2008–2010), (Season 5-Season 6) (Global TV) and Sandy Cheeks (2006), (Season 1) (Global TV)
- The Amazing World of Gumball – Gumball Watterson
- The Penguins of Madagascar – Mort (Global TV)
- Kitty Is Not a Cat – Kitty (Global TV)

=== Live action films ===
- Harry Potter – Additional Voices (Aired on HBO dubbed)
