= Ripped Pants =

- SpongeBob SquarePants episode
- Title card
- Episode no.: Season 1 Episode 2b
- Directed by: Paul Tibbitt (storyboard director); Mark O'Hare (storyboard artist); Nicholas R. Jennings (art); Edgar Larrazábal (animation); Derek Drymon (creative)
- Written by: Paul Tibbitt; Peter Burns
- Narrated by: Tom Kenny
- Editing by: Peter Burns; Christopher Hink; Lynn Hobson
- Production code: 2515-106
- Original air date: July 17, 1999
- Running time: 11 minutes (without commercials)

Episode chronology
← Previous "Bubblestand"	Next → "Jellyfishing"
- SpongeBob SquarePants season 1

"Ripped Pants" is the second segment of the second episode of the first season of the American animated television series SpongeBob SquarePants. It originally aired on Nickelodeon in the United States on July 17, 1999. In this episode, SpongeBob SquarePants repeatedly rips his pants as a joke, which people initially find funny but later get annoyed with. He eventually realizes that his jokes have gone too far and attempts to regain his friends' trust.

The episode was written by Paul Tibbitt and Peter Burns, and the animation was directed by Edgar Larrazábal. Tibbitt also served as storyboard director, and Mark O'Hare served as storyboard artist. The premise of the episode is based on an embarrassing incident by series creator Stephen Hillenburg when he was a kid. "Ripped Pants" received positive reviews, with critics from the Los Angeles Times and Variety praising its ending musical number. Variety and /Film respectively placed it as the second and seventh-best episodes of SpongeBob SquarePants.

== Plot ==
At Goo Lagoon, an underwater beach in Bikini Bottom, SpongeBob is trying to impress Sandy Cheeks by going against Larry the Lobster in a weightlifting competition when SpongeBob accidentally rips his pants, causing Sandy and the beachgoers to laugh hysterically. SpongeBob is initially upset until a beachgoer exclaims how humorous the joke is, so he keeps using the joke to gain attention. While the joke was originally funny, it starts to die out and it goes too far after SpongeBob, during a surfing competition, pretends to drown before saying that he ripped his pants.

SpongeBob, now isolated for his fake drowning, is alone on the beach. He realizes that his jokes have driven others away, and believes that he is the "biggest loser" on the beach, until being confronted by three other beachgoers, who each think they are the biggest loser. SpongeBob then sings a heartfelt song about learning from his mistakes. The fish start to like SpongeBob, Sandy hears this and forgives SpongeBob upon realizing he has learned from his mistake. At the end, Larry asks SpongeBob if he can sign his pants. SpongeBob accidentally rips his underwear completely apart, which embarrasses SpongeBob once again.

== Voice cast ==
- Tom Kenny — SpongeBob SquarePants, French Narrator
- Carolyn Lawrence — Sandy Cheeks
- Doug Lawrence — Larry the Lobster

== Production ==
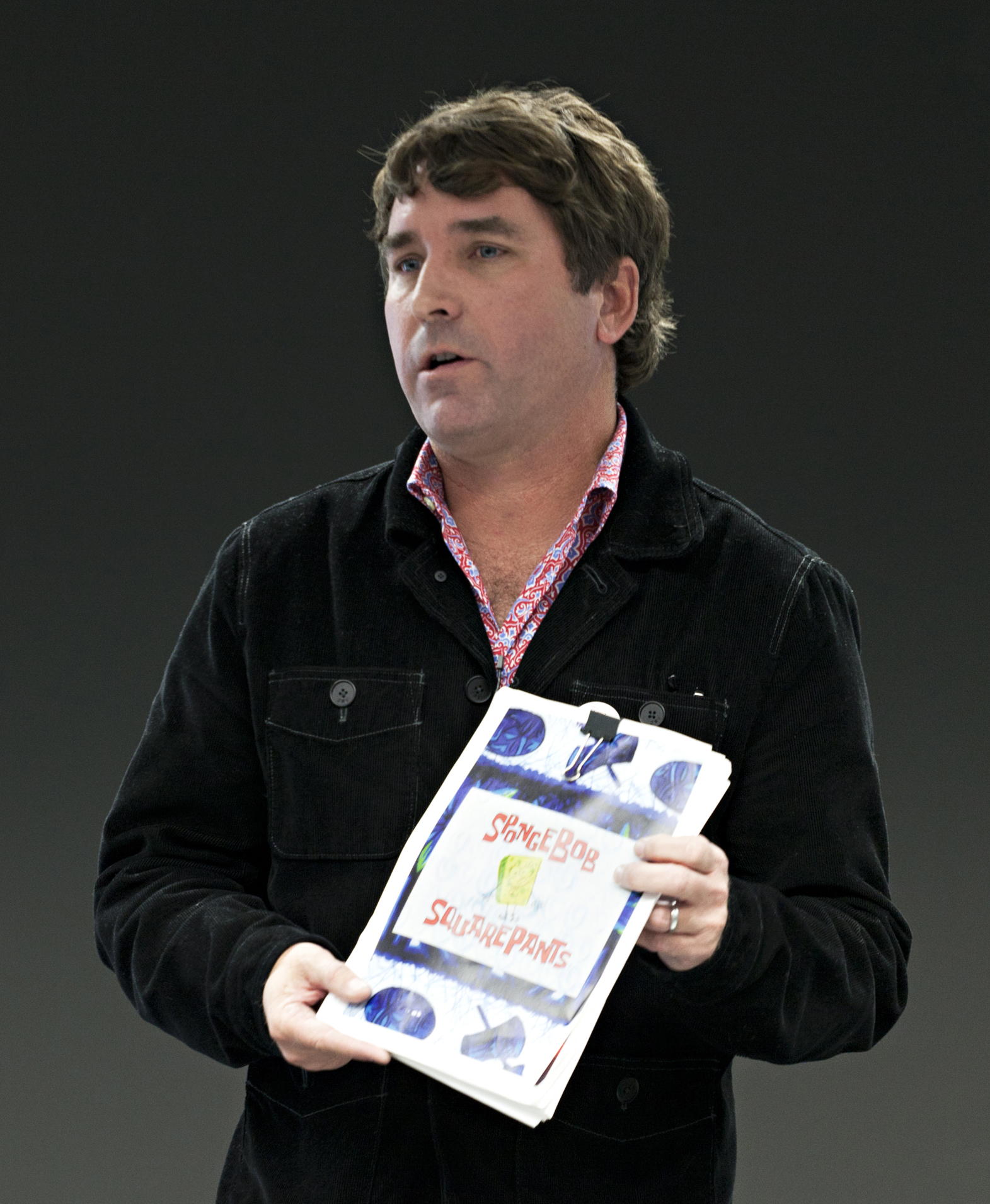
Creator of SpongeBob SquarePants, Stephen Hillenburg, had an embarrassing childhood incident that inspired this episode's plot.

"Ripped Pants" was written by Paul Tibbitt and Peter Burns, with Tibbitt also being the storyboard director. The storyboard artist was Mark O'Hare, and the animation was directed by Edgar Larrazábal. Derek Drymon served as creative director and Nicholas R. Jennings was the art director. Voice actor and writer-director Mr. Doug Lawrence revealed in an interview regarding the first season that the episode's plot is based on an embarrassing incident that Hillenburg experienced when he was a child.

Peter Burns, the story editor of the first 14 episodes of season 1, turned in a test concept of SpongeBob ripping his pants, which the creators really liked the idea of. Production executive-in-charge for the first season, Eric Coleman, described "Ripped Pants" as avoiding other cartoons' "loftier", more complex storytelling ambitions, instead the episode had a small-scale story with SpongeBob trying to connect with other characters. Coleman also called it one of his favorite episodes, and believed that the musical number at the end "kind of gave a glimpse of things to come," as later musical numbers were released. The original pitch bible included a plot titled "Mussel Beach", which featured SpongeBoy at the beach with Sandy, Larry the Lobster, and a song about lost love.

== Release ==
"Ripped Pants" first aired on Nickelodeon in the United States on July 17, 1999, with a TV-Y7 parental rating. The episode was originally paired with "Bubblestand," with both segments making up the second episode of the first season. The pairing of "Bubblestand" and "Ripped Pants" attracted 2.51 million viewers.

The episode was first released on home video as part of the VHS release Nautical Nonsense, and a scene from the episode appeared on the front cover as well. It was also released on the DVD counterpart, Nautical Nonsense and Sponge Buddies. The episode was also included on other DVD releases, such as Home Sweet Pineapple on January 19, 2005, and included in Absorbing Favorites on September 20, 2005. It was also included on multi-disc collection boxes, with "The First 100 Episodes" and "The Best 200 Episodes Ever".

== Reception ==
I think one of my favorite episodes is... "Ripped Pants," the one where SpongeBob rips his pants by mistake and gets a laugh out of it, and then overplays his hand by doing it... too many times, and people get bored with it, and he realizes that jokes have a lifespan.

— Tom Kenny, Backstage Pants

"Ripped Pants" has received positive reviews from critics, with both the episode and its eponymous song earning praise. Tom Kenny, the voice of SpongeBob SquarePants, cited "Ripped Pants" as one of his favorite episodes.

Lynne Heffley of the Los Angeles Times praised the segment's "sly humor" and "whimsical twist". Heffley lauded the choice of music as "positively inspired," noting that the plot follows SpongeBob going "overboard with a ripped pants joke". Both Maggie Dickman of Alternative Press and Caroline Siede of The A.V. Club discussed Quinton Reviews' video about the episode, with Quinton Reviews noting its parallels with contemporary meme culture, in which people can become minor celebrities through memes before their popularity fades.

Writing for The Washington Post, Michael Cavna included the segment among his top five favorite episodes of the series in 2009, naming the song in the episode as a "blueprint" for future musical numbers of SpongeBob. In 2021, Jordan Moreau, Katcy Stephan and David Viramontes of Variety ranked "Ripped Pants" as the second-best SpongeBob SquarePants episode, calling the song a homage to the work of the Beach Boys. In 2026, Mike Bedard of /Film ranked it as the seventh-best episode of SpongeBob SquarePants, writing that its combination of "good jokes, an amazing song, and an important lesson for kids at the end" is what the show should be about. Mike Jackson of DVD Verdict wrote on the Nautical Nonsense and Sponge Buddies DVD review that the episode is funny at first but soon it "gets old", until being saved by the "Beach Boys-esque ditty". Bill Treadway, also of DVD Verdict, on the SpongeBob SquarePants Season 1 DVD review, awarded "Ripped Pants" 4 out of 5 stars, opining that the episode is "one of the best with a great musical number".

"Ripped Pants" has been placed highly in two broadcast marathons. In November 2007, the episode was ranked as the sixth-greatest Nicktoon episode of all time during Nicktoons' four-day marathon event, "The 100 Greatest Nicktoon Episodes". In 2009, "Ripped Pants" was chosen by viewers on Nick.com as the No. 3 episode in Nickelodeon's July 2009 television milestone event "The Ultimate SpongeBob SpongeBash", a multi-day marathon celebrating the 10th anniversary of the series.

== See also ==
- List of SpongeBob SquarePants episodes
- SpongeBob SquarePants season 1
- SpongeBob SquarePants: Original Theme Highlights
