= Pizza Delivery (SpongeBob SquarePants) =

- SpongeBob SquarePants episode
- Title card
- Episode no.: Season 1 Episode 5a
- Directed by: Sherm Cohen; Sean Dempsey
- Written by: Sherm Cohen; Aaron Springer; Peter Burns
- Production code: 2515-107
- Original air date: August 14, 1999

Episode chronology
← Previous "Boating School"	Next → "Home Sweet Pineapple"
- SpongeBob SquarePants (season 1)

"Pizza Delivery" is the first segment of the fifth episode of the first season of the American animated television series SpongeBob SquarePants. It first aired on Nickelodeon in the United States on August 14, 1999. The segment was written by Sherm Cohen, Aaron Springer, and Peter Burns, and the animation was directed by Sean Dempsey. Cohen also functioned as storyboard director, and Springer worked as storyboard artist.

In the episode, the Krusty Krab receives a call from a customer ordering a pizza, and Mr. Krabs sends SpongeBob and Squidward to deliver it. When the two employees become stranded in the middle of a desert, they get into numerous predicaments. Along the way, SpongeBob tries to show Squidward the lifestyle of the pioneers.

In pitching the show to Nickelodeon, creator Stephen Hillenburg originally wanted the idea of having the characters on a road trip, inspired by the 1989 film Powwow Highway. The concept was later reworked for the story of the episode. The episode received critical acclaim, with most considering it one of the show's best episodes. In 2024, Rolling Stone named it one of the top 100 television episodes of all time.

== Plot ==
SpongeBob (right) beatboxes while he and Squidward (left) deliver the pizza on foot in the middle of a desert after losing their boatmobile

The Krusty Krab restaurant receives a call from a customer for a pizza, and Mr. Krabs sends Squidward and SpongeBob to deliver it. Squidward, who simply wants to go home, makes SpongeBob drive the boatmobile, who is still in boating school. When instructed to shift into reverse, he hesitates before backing up until the boat runs out of fuel, stranding the two of them in the desert. When Squidward kicks the boat in frustration, it accelerates on its own, leaving him and SpongeBob behind.

As they walk back to Bikini Bottom, Squidward is annoyed by SpongeBob's dedication to delivering the pizza, as he's more interested in returning to civilization. SpongeBob's devotion to the pizza gets them sucked into a tornado at one point, leaving them more lost than before. Throughout the journey, SpongeBob shows Squidward some pioneer tricks, such as hitchhiking, eating coral, telling where civilization is by looking at what direction algae points, and even using rocks as vehicles. Squidward does not believe SpongeBob until they end up driving the rock all the way to the customer's house.

However, when they finally deliver the pizza, the customer gets extremely angry that he did not get any soda, despite seemingly not ordering any, and refuses to pay for it, causing SpongeBob to cry. Angered by this, Squidward smashes the pizza in the customer's face in retaliation. He then tells SpongeBob the customer simply changed his mind, before asking him to take them home, but SpongeBob notes that they have enough time to go back to work, to Squidward's consternation.

== Production ==
"Pizza Delivery" was written by Sherm Cohen, Aaron Springer and Peter Burns, with Sean Dempsey serving as animation director. Cohen also functioned as storyboard director, and Springer worked as storyboard artist. Series creator Stephen Hillenburg's original idea for the series pitch was that the writers would write a storyboard for a possible episode and pitch it to Nickelodeon. Hillenburg wanted to write an episode with SpongeBob and Squidward on a road trip, inspired by the 1989 film Powwow Highway, with Derek Drymon describing the film's story as about "an innocent, kid-like character who is traveling with a curmudgeon". Eventually, the idea developed while they were working on it, but Hillenburg gave up the idea for the initial pitch. Instead, they used another idea for the pitch which was in the series pilot episode called "Help Wanted". Writers Aaron Springer and Sherm Cohen resurrected the road trip idea during the first season and used a lot of the ideas for "Pizza Delivery". After the completion of the pilot, "Pizza Delivery" was one of the first episodes to be worked on shortly after the series' greenlight, with the storyboarding phase taking place in May 1998.

== Release ==
"Pizza Delivery" originally aired on Nickelodeon in the United States on August 14, 1999, at 10:00am, with a TV-Y7 parental rating. The episode was released on the DVD compilation called SpongeBob SquarePants: Christmas on September 30, 2003. It was also included in SpongeBob SquarePants: The Complete 1st Season DVD released on October 28, 2003. The episode was included in the Game Boy Advance Video compilation cartridge Nicktoons Collection: Volume 1, released in June 2004, along with episodes of All Grown Up! and The Fairly OddParents. On September 22, 2009, "Pizza Delivery" was released on the SpongeBob SquarePants: The First 100 Episodes DVD, alongside all the episodes of seasons one through five. On April 29, 2014, "Pizza Delivery" was released on the "SpongeBob, You're Fired!" episode compilation DVD. "Pizza Delivery" was also included in a slim packaging reprint of the 1st season DVD, which released in 2012. It was reissued in a box set with season 2's slim release in 2018.

== Reception ==
=== Ratings ===
When this episode initially aired on Nickelodeon on August 14, 1999, at 10:00am alongside its sister episode "Home Sweet Pineapple," it was reported to have received 1.617 million viewers with kids aged 2–11, losing in that demographic to a rerun of Pokémon, which had 2.227 million by comparison. However, the episode beat out the rerun in total viewers, with a total of 2.471 million tuning to watch SpongeBob, while Pokémon had averaged 2.326 million viewers that day. This left both shows tied in the ratings they had competed for over the last five weeks, beginning when SpongeBob first aired on Saturday morning on July 17.

=== Critical response ===
"Pizza Delivery" received critical acclaim and is frequently cited as one of the show's best episodes. Rolling Stone ranked the episode #89 in their listing of the 100 Best TV Episodes of All Time, writing that "the absurdist humor that made SpongeBob SquarePants beloved across multiple generations is already at full strength in this early episode". Jordan Moreau, Katcy Stephan and David Viramontes of Variety ranked "Pizza Delivery" the third best episode of the show. Giving the episode 5 out of 5 stars, Bill Treadway of DVD Verdict said the episode is his "personal favorite of all the episodes", writing that "this one is loaded with enough unique twists and hilarious comedy to bear repeat viewings." In 2025, Mike Bedard of /Film ranked the episode No. 2 in their 15 Best SpongeBob episodes list. The writer called it "SpongeBob at its finest," as it showcases "the platonic ideals of all the main characters while delivering one brilliant joke after another."

Emily Estep of WeGotThisCovered.com ranked the episode No. 1 on her "Top 10 Episodes of SpongeBob SquarePants" list, writing that the episode "has the undervalued nostalgia of being episode five of the entire series and it benefits from the aforementioned chemistry of Spongebob and Squidward." She also praised the episode as "an in-depth look at their [SpongeBob and Squidward] relationship, and it set the tone for just how strange the show could be." Estep lauded the hitchhiking dances by SpongeBob, saying "These moves are amusing and charming, while Squidward's bitterness is easy to relate to." Priya Elan of The Guardian ranked the episode at No. 3 on his top five favorite SpongeBob "moments," while Andrew Firriolo of BuzzFeed deemed it the most memorable, saying that "Between the rock, the pioneers, and the Krusty Krab's pizza song, 'Pizza Delivery' is a treasure trove of funny moments." He also highlighted the friendship between SpongeBob and Squidward. In 2009, "Pizza Delivery" was chosen by viewers on Nick.com as the No. 1 episode during a television marathon called "The Ultimate SpongeBob SpongeBash".

Ed Gonzalez of Slant Magazine rated it "average" since it was "notable only for SpongeBob's last-minute meltdown, figuratively and literally", meanwhile, Joshua Olivieri of Screen Rant said that "It also ends with one of the best jokes in the series." As of 2023, the episode alongside its accompanying segment, "Home Sweet Pineapple", rank No. 9 in the highest rated SpongeBob SquarePants according to IMDb, with a 9.1 out of 10 user rating. In the iTunes collection "SpongeBob SquarePants: Tom Kenny's Top 20", Tom Kenny, the voice actor for SpongeBob, lists it as among his all-time favorite episodes. He writes in the description for the episode:

"The classic setup: SpongeBob and Squidward lost in the desert while delivering a pizza to a customer's home. Squidward just wants to get out of there, but SpongeBob sees his pizza delivery as a sacred oath between himself and the customer. I like when SpongeBob singing to himself—'The Krusty Krab pizza is the pizza' ...turns into a bizarre gospel jingle singer—'Krusty Kray -ya ya-yaaa-aaab!'"
