= Pearl Krabs =

Fictional animated SpongeBob SquarePants character

- SpongeBob SquarePants character
- First appearance: "Squeaky Boots"; SpongeBob SquarePants; September 17, 1999
- Created by: Stephen Hillenburg
- Designed by: Stephen Hillenburg
- Voiced by: Lori Alan
- Portrayed by: Jai'len Josey (Broadway)

In-universe information
- Species: Sperm whale
- Gender: Female
- Occupation: Assistant at the Bikini Bottom Mall
- Family: Mr. Krabs (father); Mrs. Krabs (mother)
- Relatives: Victor Krabs (grandfather); Betsy Krabs (grandmother); Redbeard Krabs (great-grandfather); Sally (great-aunt); Unnamed aunt; Krabs' nephews (cousins)

Pearl Krabs is a fictional character in Nickelodeon's animated television series SpongeBob SquarePants. She is voiced by actress Lori Alan and first appeared in the season one episode "Squeaky Boots" on September 17, 1999. She was created by marine biologist and animator Stephen Hillenburg, who was inspired to design a whale character while supervising whale watches at the Ocean Institute in Dana Point, California.

Pearl is an anthropomorphic adolescent sperm whale who lives in a hollow anchor with her father Eugene "Mr." Krabs, the greedy founder of the popular Krusty Krab restaurant. Pearl will inherit the restaurant and become its owner when she grows older. She is currently employed at the local shopping center, the Bikini Bottom Mall. The identity and whereabouts of Pearl's unseen mother have never been explained directly by the characters. While supplemental materials indicate her father married a whale who gave birth to Pearl, Hillenburg was strongly against revealing this in an episode.

Critical reception for Pearl has been largely positive. Her depiction as the child of a single parent has been praised by critics as an example of SpongeBob's ability to challenge social norms. She has been featured frequently in a variety of merchandise, such as plush toys and video games, and at amusement park attractions. She appears in the 2004 feature film The SpongeBob SquarePants Movie, the 2017 Broadway musical based on the series, in Kamp Koral: SpongeBob's Under Years as an infant, and as a young child in The Patrick Star Show.

== Role in SpongeBob SquarePants ==
Because she is a whale and most other characters are small tide pool organisms, Pearl is depicted as extraordinarily tall and heavy. Her size compared to the other characters is often used for visual gags; for example, she is able to shake the entire Krusty Krab when she jumps and can fill the entire building with tears when she cries. The floors of the Krabs' residence are equipped with drain plugs so the house can be emptied after Pearl cries or spouts water from her blowhole. Wherever she goes, she stomps loudly and causes the ground to shake slightly.

Mr. Krabs attempts to interest Pearl in working at the Krusty Krab—their family business—but she does not want to work there until she graduates from high school, believing it would deprive her of a social life. Despite this, she manages the Krusty Krab when Mr. Krabs cannot, and fills in for other employees when needed. Being a sperm whale, Pearl has the largest brain of any Bikini Bottom resident and is gifted in math. Mr. Krabs has tried to use this to his own advantage and wants Pearl to eventually become a bookkeeper for his restaurant.

Pearl's favorite activities are socializing at the Bikini Bottom Mall and using her father's credit card to buy anything that is totally "coral" (Bikini Bottom slang for "cool"). Mr. Krabs disapproves of Pearl's prodigious spending, but nonetheless pays for her items to avoid disappointing his daughter. Pearl is employed as an assistant at Grandma's Apron, a store for elderly residents on the ground floor of the shopping center. Beatrice, her boss at Grandma's Apron, was voiced by actress Betty White.

=== Fictional origin ===
The disparity in species between Pearl and her father has never been explained directly in an episode, but merchandise makers and production crew members have stated that Mr. Krabs was once married to a whale who gave birth to Pearl. A trivia book penned by former SpongeBob writer David Fain in 2000 states that Pearl "takes after her mother," implying that she is the biological offspring of Mr. Krabs and a whale. According to creative director Vincent Waller, Stephen Hillenburg received many letters requesting a Pearl origin story, but was still "very much against solving [the] mystery" of how she joined the Krabs family. A step outline for an episode focusing on her origin was written and started early development stages, but the episode has been shelved indefinitely because of Hillenburg's disapproval.

Pearl's name, and the decision to portray her as motherless, were an homage to the phrase mother-of-pearl, which refers to the inner layer of some sea-dwelling mollusk shells. Mr. Krabs uses this phrase when he is startled, in a similar vein to "Mother of God", as a reference to the absence of Pearl's mother. His use of the phrase only when he is dismayed or shocked has led some viewers to believe something tragic happened to Mrs. Krabs.

At Dragon Con in 2016, Lori Alan and Rodger Bumpass addressed Pearl's origins as their characters Pearl and Squidward. In the skit, Squidward asks Pearl if she is adopted. Pearl does not give a definite response, instead saying that she gets emotional over the topic. Later at the same event, the actors discussed the disappearance of Pearl's mother. Alan affirmed that Mrs. Krabs' whereabouts are secret, and Bumpass joked that she had been taken to an oceanarium, saying: "Two words: Sea World."

== Character ==
=== Creation and design ===
An early drawing of Pearl and Mr. Krabs from Hillenburg's series bible

Pearl was one of the first five characters Stephen Hillenburg created for SpongeBob. Her conceptualization is rooted in Hillenburg's tenure as a teacher at the Orange County Marine Institute in Dana Point, California. Screenwriter Allan Neuwirth describes the Marine Institute as Hillenburg's "first stop on the road to SpongeBob SquarePants," as it inspired the development of many of the series' characters; Hillenburg's decision to include a whale character was influenced by his regular supervision of whale watches, and a cetacean skeleton exhibit at the institute. Hillenburg's original sketch of Pearl in the show bible included flukes and pigtails, which were dropped from her final design. Mr. Krabs and Pearl had matching yellow and orange clothes initially, but they were given individualized colors before the production of the pilot episode.

Hillenburg made Pearl a different species from her father because he wanted each member of the main cast to be a different type of animal. When he was first developing the characters, Hillenburg wanted Pearl and Mr. Krabs to travel around town in a caravan boat with a whale-sized teardrop trailer connected to it; while this element did make it into the series, it was only used sparsely in season one. The decision to have Mr. Krabs and Pearl live in an anchor was made after production of the first season had begun. The original map of the show's setting, which Hillenburg showed Nickelodeon executives as part of his pitch to the network in 1997, did not include an anchor house, and instead labeled the Krusty Krab as both characters' residence.

Hillenburg originally planned for Pearl and Mr. Krabs to be mostly separate characters, with specific episodes dedicated to each character individually. This happened in several early episodes, such as "The Chaperone," but the writers found it more natural to include Mr. Krabs in Pearl-centric stories. Hillenburg considered this the biggest difference between the series and how he originally envisioned it. Animation historian Jerry Beck has stated that Pearl's breakout role was in "Bossy Boots," which he considers the episode that best established her as one of the series' stars.

=== Voice ===
Pearl's voice is provided by American actress Lori Alan in the series, both feature films, and the associated video games. During her audition for the role, she was shown an early drawing of Pearl with the other main characters. She noted how Pearl was much larger than the rest of the cast, and decided to reflect the character's size in her voice by making it deep and full in tone. She also aimed to make the voice invoke the sound of whales’ low vocalizations while also sounding "spoiled and lovable". In an interview with AfterBuzz TV, Alan said that she knew Pearl "had to sound somewhat like a child," but at the same time needed "an abnormally large voice".

Pearl's catchphrase "Daddy!" was developed early during production of the first season, but was not used in an episode until later on. A script that the main voice actors were reading from during a rehearsal had the line fully capitalized, with the first syllable extended ("daaaaddy!"), so Alan knew to put particular emphasis on the line when it was in a script. Rodger Bumpass, the voice of Squidward Tentacles, describes Alan's portrayal of Pearl as a "unique and wonderful take on how this teenager should be ... No one else has a teenager that sounds like Pearl."

== Reception ==
=== Critical response ===
Pearl's character has received popularity and critical acclaim. In a review of the first official trailer for The SpongeBob Movie: Sponge Out of Water, Victoria McNally of The Mary Sue said that Pearl was her favorite character, and she was disappointed not to see her in the movie's preview. She writes, "if they can manage to work Pearl into the plot somewhere, I'll take back everything I've already said about this film. Maybe she could get beached on the shore, I don't know. Pearl's the best." Joseph Foy, author of the novel SpongeBob SquarePants and Philosophy, felt that it was difficult not to sympathize with Pearl's situation since she believes she is "more important to her father than money," but "we, the viewing audience, know differently". DVD Talk's Paul Mavis wrote in his review of Legends of Bikini Bottom that he found Pearl "annoyingly funny". In 2013, José Antonio Gómez Marín of El Mundo said that he felt Pearl brings an easily recognizable youthful tone to the show.

Like Mr. Krabs, Pearl has also been considered a stereotyped character; Sharon Lamb and Lyn Mikel Brown wrote in their 2007 book Packaging Girlhood that Pearl exhibits the traits of an archetypal girly girl. A study by the federal office of gender equality in Mexico, El Instituto Nacional de las Mujeres, found that Pearl's roles sometimes rely on characteristics associated with stereotypes of women, such as vanity and materialism.

In an article for Complex, Debbie Encalada praised the SpongeBob series for challenging social norms; the portrayal of the Krabses as a single-parent family was specifically highlighted as an example of the show's "subversiveness by subtly challenging the idea of the nuclear family". Psychologist Steve Harriman covers the Krabs family dynamic in the 2005 Berkley Book Absorbing SpongeBob. He calls attention to the lack of explanation for the disparity between Pearl and Mr. Krabs' species, noting that it is only after watching several episodes that viewers realize the Krabs family is broken. He also questions the decision to focus on Patrick's family, rather than Pearl's, in the only episode dealing "head-on with a core pathology of family"—"I'm with Stupid". In his review of the third season, Bryan Pope of DVD Verdict called Mr. Krabs and Pearl (as well as Krabs' girlfriend Mrs. Puff, whom he mistook for the character's wife) one of "the most head-scratching family units [he had] ever come across".

=== Fan theories ===
The absence of Pearl's mother has caused much speculation among viewers since the series' debut. Various fan theories about how Pearl became Mr. Krabs' daughter have become popular on the internet. Jon Negroni, creator of "the Pixar Theory," theorized that Mr. Krabs' fear of fish hooks in the episode "Hooky" suggests a fish hook was involved in the death of Pearl's mother, who was presumably a whale like Pearl.

== In other media ==
Pearl has been featured in a variety of merchandise such as plush toys, video games, comics and trading cards. The Krabs family restaurant, the Krusty Krab, has been the basis for a Lego playset, and many replicas at attractions. A float modeled after the Krusty Krab, featuring a costumed mascot of Pearl that greeted guests and an animatronic Mr. Krabs, regularly appeared at Sea World's weekly "SpongeBob ParadePants" parade. A full-size replica of the building was built in Ramallah, Palestine in 2014. In January 2016, Nickelodeon's parent company Viacom filed a lawsuit against the operators of a similar for-profit "Krusty Krab" restaurant to be opened in Texas. A Texas federal judge ruled in January 2017 that the planned restaurant violated Viacom's rights to the SpongeBob property, thus halting its construction.

In 2011, the indie rock group Yo La Tengo performed a live version of Mr. Krabs and Pearl's commercial from the episode "As Seen on TV" at the El Rey Theatre in Los Angeles, California. Included as part of Yo La Tengo's first tour, it starred Ira Kaplan as Mr. Krabs and Laura Krafft as Pearl. Billy Gil of L.A. Record praised the performance in his review. An episode of the sketch comedy series Robot Chicken titled "Major League of Extraordinary Gentlemen" includes a skit that stars Mr. Krabs and Pearl. The segment, animated in stop motion like most other sketches on the program, features Mr. Krabs using crab legs as the secret ingredient for Krabby Patties. Before he is exposed for serving cannibal meals, Pearl is shown unsuspectingly eating the patties. Several tracks on The Best Day Ever, a 2006 soundtrack album, feature the vocal performance of Lori Alan as Pearl. The segment "Pearl Krabs aka Caller #5!" is a skit between Pearl and a disc jockey voiced by radio personality Jerry Blavat.

=== Broadway musical ===
In the 2017 Broadway musical based on SpongeBob, which premiered at the Palace Theatre in New York City, Pearl is played by Jai'len Christine Li Josey. Her attire in the musical was inspired by her animated counterpart; it includes a cheerleading uniform, an Afro styled into the shape of Pearl's whale head, and a pair of platform sneakers that replicate Pearl's signature loud stomping from the cartoon. In the production, Mr. Krabs plans to make her the Krusty Krab's new manager rather than SpongeBob. However, Pearl wants to become a rock band singer instead and is troubled by her father's disregard for her own hopes and dreams. She sings a duet with Mr. Krabs titled "Daddy Knows Best," an original composition written by Alex Ebert that highlights the two characters' differences.

Josey's performance as Pearl has been critically lauded, with some reviewers highlighting her as the breakout star of the musical. Entertainment Tonight named Josey one of the eight best Broadway debuts of 2017, writing that none of the musical's other debuts "were more impressive than Josey, who at 18, quite literally stormed the stage as the teenage sperm whale Pearl Krabs. Her looming presence was only matched by her stunning vocal performance." Josh Ferri of BroadwayBox.com included Pearl's "Daddy Knows Best" on a list of his 15 favorite Broadway songs of 2017, calling it "a rare star is born moment...this is for [Josey] what 'Miss Marmelstein' was for young Streisand." Jo Rosenthal of Vice wrote that "Josey nearly stole the entire show as Pearl, her voice eliciting roars of joy from the audience as she lamented the greed of her dad, Mr. Krabs." Casey Curtis of the New York Theatre Guide said that Josey's voice "was so beautifully strong and clear that it made me get misty-eyed." Vulture's Sara Holdren said, "Definitely try not to say 'daaamn' under your breath [during] 'Daddy Knows Best.' This whale can wail." Isabella Biedenharn of Entertainment Weekly called Josey's Pearl a "vocal powerhouse" and Siddhant Adlakha of Birth.Movies.Death. said that "every solo she gets is a moment to behold." Audience reception was similarly positive; in an analysis of reviews from children who attended the musical, Newsday reported that Pearl's character was "a part of the show that everyone seemed to enjoy" and that Josey's vocal performance "was an outstanding addition."

== See also ==
- List of individual cetaceans
