= SpongeBob SquarePants season 1 =

Season of television series

SpongeBob SquarePants
- Season 1
- DVD cover
- Showrunner: Stephen Hillenburg
- Starring: Tom Kenny; Bill Fagerbakke; Rodger Bumpass; Clancy Brown; Mr. Lawrence; Jill Talley; Carolyn Lawrence; Mary Jo Catlett; Lori Alan
- No. of episodes: 20 (41 segments)

Release
- Original network: Nickelodeon
- Original release: May 1, 1999 – March 3, 2001

Season chronology
- Next → Season 2

The first season of the American animated television series SpongeBob SquarePants, created by former marine biologist and animator Stephen Hillenburg, aired on Nickelodeon from May 1, 1999, to March 3, 2001, and consists of 20 half-hour episodes. The series chronicles the exploits and adventures of the title character and his various friends in the fictional underwater city of Bikini Bottom. The show features the voices of Tom Kenny, Bill Fagerbakke, Rodger Bumpass, Clancy Brown, Mr. Lawrence, Jill Talley, Carolyn Lawrence, Mary Jo Catlett, and Lori Alan. Among the first guest stars to appear on the show were Ernest Borgnine and Tim Conway voicing the superhero characters of Mermaid Man and Barnacle Boy, respectively.

Hillenburg initially conceived the show in 1994 and began to work on it shortly after the cancellation of Rocko's Modern Life in 1996. To voice the character of SpongeBob, Hillenburg approached Tom Kenny, who had worked with him on Rocko's Modern Life. The show was originally to be called SpongeBoy Ahoy!, but the name SpongeBoy was already in use for an art pencil product. Upon finding it out, Hillenburg decided to use the name "SpongeBob". He chose "SquarePants" as a family name as it referred to the character's square shape and it had a "nice ring to it".

The SpongeBob SquarePants: The Complete 1st Season DVD was released in Region 1 on October 28, 2003, Region 2 on November 7, 2005, and Region 4 on November 30, 2006. The pilot episode, "Help Wanted", was not included on the DVD due to copyright issues with the song "Livin' in the Sunlight, Lovin' in the Moonlight" by Tiny Tim, which appears in the episode, but was later released as a bonus feature on various series DVDs, including that of the third season. Several compilation DVDs that contained episodes from the season were released prior and after. The season received positive reviews from media critics upon release.

== Production ==
=== Development ===
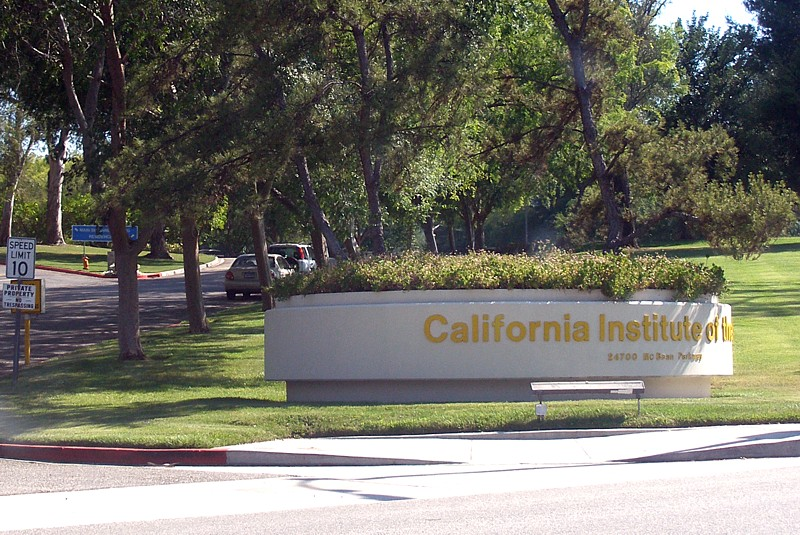
Stephen Hillenburg became an animator during his period of study at the California Institute of the Arts.

In the mid-1980s, SpongeBob SquarePants creator Stephen Hillenburg taught and studied marine biology at what is now the Orange County Ocean Institute. While Hillenburg was there, his love of the ocean began to influence his artistry. He created a precursor to SpongeBob: a comic book titled The Intertidal Zone used by the institute to teach visiting students about the animal life of tide pools. The comic starred various anthropomorphic sea lifeforms, many of which would evolve into SpongeBob SquarePants characters. Hillenburg tried to get the comic professionally published, but none of the companies he sent it to were interested. In 1987, Hillenburg left the institute to pursue his dream of becoming an animator. In 1992, Hillenburg began attending the California Institute of the Arts to study animation, having been accepted into the institute by Jules Engel, who was impressed with Hillenburg's previous work.

While attending animation school, Hillenburg received a job on the children's television series Mother Goose and Grimm, and worked on the series from 1991 to 1993. During his time at the California Institute of the Arts, he made his thesis film entitled Wormholes, which was funded by the Princess Grace Foundation and was later displayed at various animation festivals. In 1992, Joe Murray, who had just sold his show Rocko's Modern Life to Nickelodeon, met Hillenburg at an animation festival, and offered him a job as a director of the series.

By the time Rocko's Modern Life concluded in 1996, Hillenburg had risen to the rank of creative director and showrunner following Murray's departure from the show. Shortly following this, Hillenburg began developing SpongeBob SquarePants, using The Intertidal Zone as basis for the show following a discussion with Rocko writer Martin Olson, and worked with several Nickelodeon veterans and Rocko crew members, including creative director Derek Drymon, writers and directors Sherm Cohen and Dan Povenmire, writer Tim Hill, Martin Olson, animation director Alan Smart, and story editor Merriwether Williams. To voice the character of SpongeBob, Hillenburg approached Tom Kenny, who had worked with him on Rocko's Modern Life. Originally, Hillenburg wanted to use the name SpongeBoy—the character had no last name—and the series would have been called SpongeBoy Ahoy!. However, the Nickelodeon legal department discovered that the name SpongeBoy was already in use for an art themed pencil product. This was discovered after voice acting for the original seven-minute pilot was recorded in 1997. In September 1997, upon finding this out, Hillenburg decided that the character's given name still had to contain "Sponge" so viewers would not mistake the character for a "Cheese Man". Hillenburg decided to use the name "SpongeBob". He chose "SquarePants" as a family name as it referred to the character's square shape and it had a "nice ring to it".

The series was officially announced in December 1998, with thirteen episodes being planned at the time. The series was originally going to take place in a post-apocalyptic war that ravaged Earth, with Bikini Bottom being the only surviving place from said war. Although, this concept was later scrapped during the first season's development.

=== Cast ===
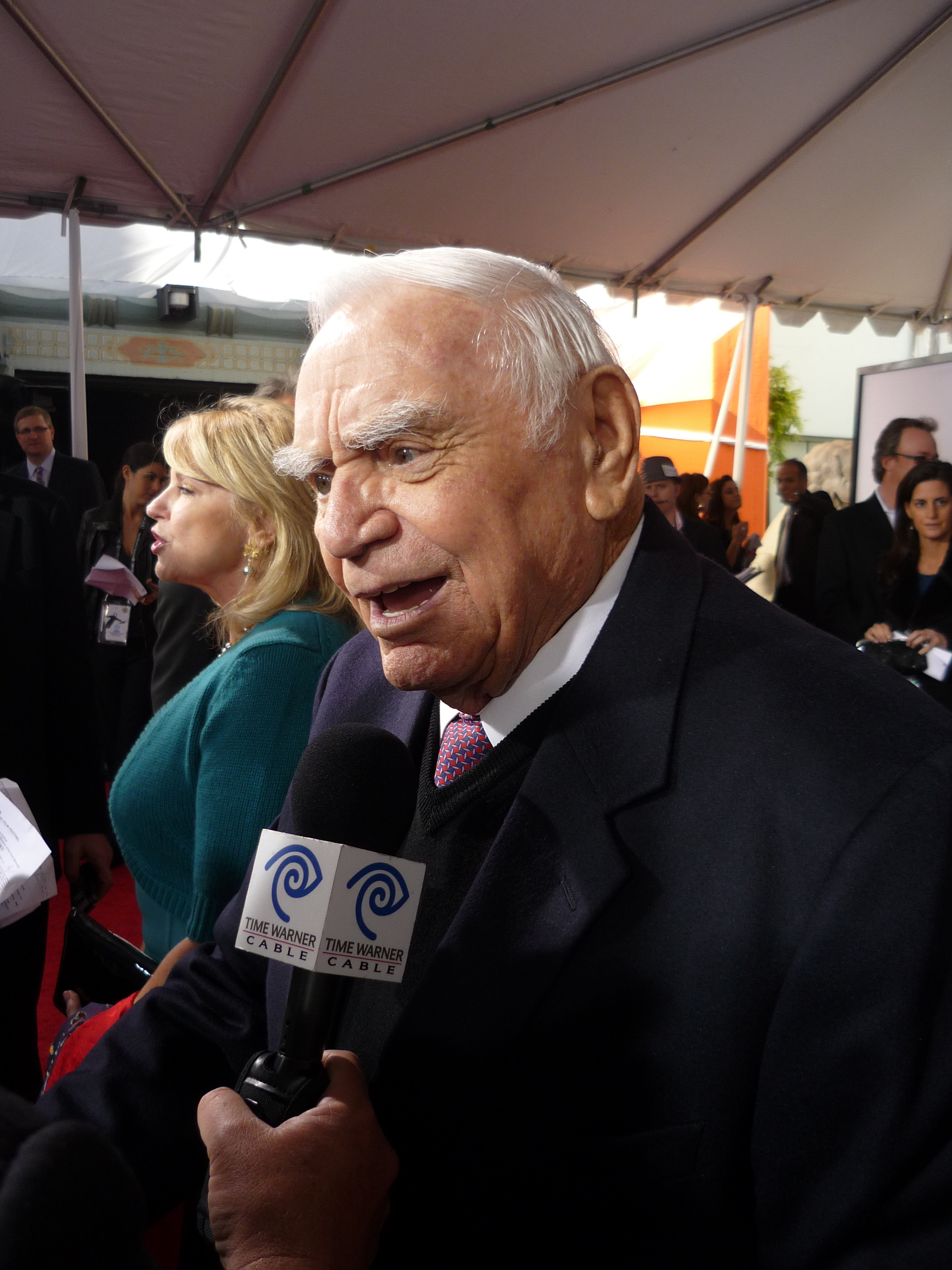
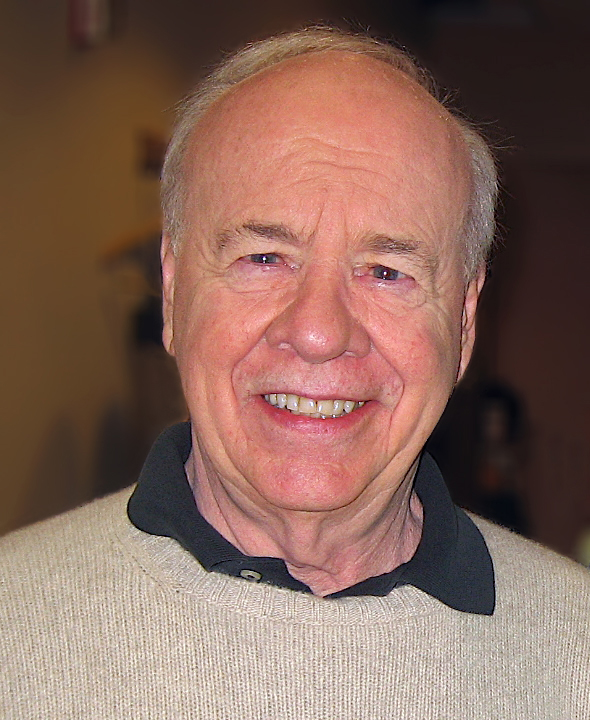
Ernest Borgnine (left) and Tim Conway (right) guest starred as the voices of Mermaid Man and Barnacle Boy, respectively, in the episode of the same name.

The first season featured Tom Kenny as the voice of the title character SpongeBob SquarePants and his pet snail Gary. SpongeBob's best friend, a starfish named Patrick Star, was voiced by Bill Fagerbakke, while Rodger Bumpass was the voice of Squidward Tentacles, an arrogant and ill-tempered octopus. Other members of the cast were Clancy Brown as Mr. Krabs, a miserly crab obsessed with money and SpongeBob's boss at the Krusty Krab; Mr. Lawrence as Plankton, a small green copepod and Mr. Krabs' business rival; Jill Talley as Karen, Plankton's sentient computer wife; Carolyn Lawrence as Sandy Cheeks, a squirrel from Texas; Mary Jo Catlett as Mrs. Puff, SpongeBob's boating school teacher; and Lori Alan as Pearl Krabs, a teenage whale who is Mr. Krabs' daughter.

While Hillenburg, Derek Drymon, and Tim Hill were writing the pilot "Help Wanted", Hillenburg was also conducting auditions to find voices for the show's characters. He had created the character of SpongeBob with Tom Kenny, in which he utilised Kenny's and other people's personalities to help create SpongeBob's personality. The voice of SpongeBob was originally used by Kenny for a minor female alligator character named Al in Rocko's Modern Life. Kenny forgot the voice initially, as he created it only for that single use. Hillenburg, however, remembered it when he was coming up with SpongeBob and used a video clip of the episode to remind Kenny of the voice. Kenny said that SpongeBob's high-pitched laugh was specifically aimed at being unique, stating that they wanted an annoying laugh in the tradition of Popeye and Woody Woodpecker. Hillenburg originally had Mr. Lawrence for the role of voicing Squidward. Drymon said, "We knew Doug from Rocko, where he was a storyboard director and where he also did the voice of Filburt. We were showing Doug the storyboard, and he started reading back to us in his Tony the Tiger/Gregory Peck voice. It was really funny, and we wound up having SpongeBob use a deep voice when he entered the Krusty Krab for the first time." Hillenburg loved the voice and decided to let Lawrence play a variety of incidental characters, including Plankton.

In addition to the regular cast members, episodes feature guest voices from many ranges of professions, including actors, musicians, and artists. Former McHale's Navy actors Ernest Borgnine and Tim Conway reunited for their first joint TV project in 33 years as guest actors portraying SpongeBob's favorite superheroes, Mermaid Man and Barnacle Boy, respectively. Borgnine said "We [he and Conway] played off each other. Tim's such a performer – a little more caustic than I am. We were making all sorts of noise. People outside the room were guffawing. We're supposed to be underwater, you know." They would reprise their role in the episode "Mermaid Man and Barnacle Boy II", which also guest starred Charles Nelson Reilly as their nemesis, the Dirty Bubble. In the episode "Scaredy Pants", a Halloween special, American band the Ghastly Ones had a special musical performance, while Brian Doyle-Murray voiced the Flying Dutchman. American country guitarist and singer Junior Brown made a vocal cameo, performing the song "Texas" in the episode of the same name. In "Neptune's Spatula", John O'Hurley appeared as King Neptune. John Lurie and Jim Jarmusch (who collaborated to make the films Stranger Than Paradise and Down by Law) made a cameo as themselves in the episode "Hooky" through excerpts from the Bravo series Fishing with John.

=== Writing ===
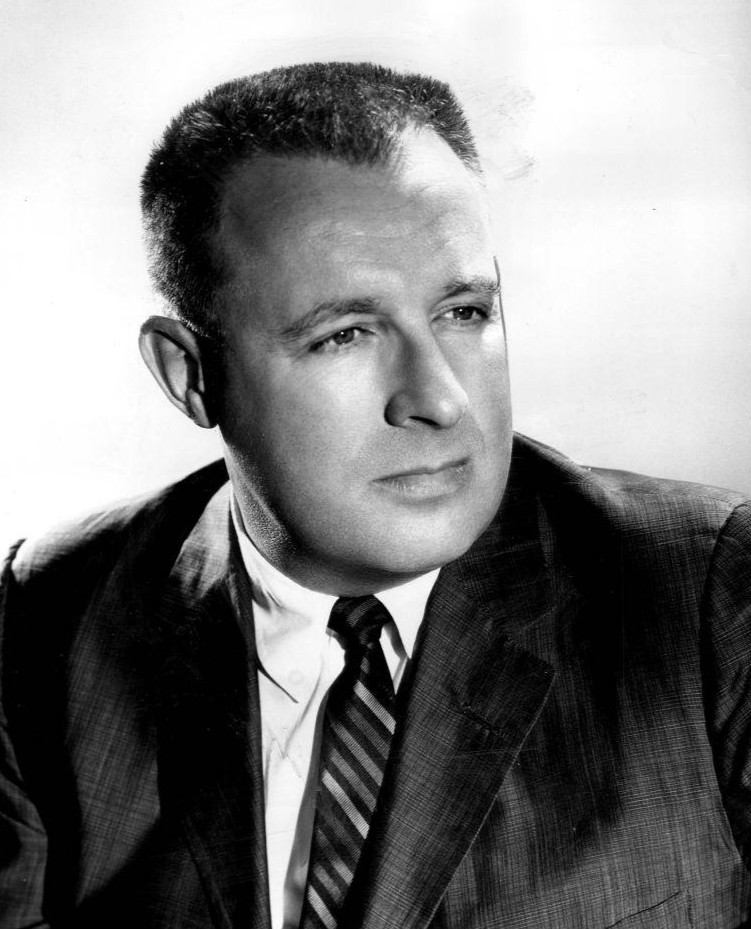
Ray Bradbury wrote the book Zen in the Art of Writing, which Merriwether Williams used to conceive an exercise for writing meetings that could generate ideas for possible episodes.

Prior to start of production on the show, Hillenburg decided early that he wanted SpongeBob SquarePants to be a storyboard-driven show, rather than script-driven. Storyboard-driven is an approach that required artists who could take a skeletal story outline and flesh it out with sight gags, dialogue and a structure that "would strike a balance between narrative and whimsy." Hillenburg originally wanted "a team of young and hungry people" to work on the show. The group, who worked with Hillenburg on Rocko's Modern Life before, consisted of Alan Smart, Nick Jennings, and Derek Drymon. Tim Hill was asked about if he want to work as story editor, but he was unavailable at the time. The crew got Peter Burns to work as story editor who developed the idea for the episode "Ripped Pants" about SpongeBob ripping his pants.

During the first season, the writing staff used most of the story ideas that were in Hillenburg's series bible and they had problems on how to generate new ideas. At one point, the writing staff went to the beach for inspiration for a possible episode. However, the day "was overcast and cold, so we [the writers] had to stay in the car." Drymon said "We didn't come up with too many ideas that day." Story editor Peter Burns left, and the crew had Merriwether Williams to overtake. Hillenburg said to Williams that "it was her responsibility to get us [the writers] to come up with new ideas." Drymon said "[It] is a tall order." Williams gave Drymon a book called Zen in the Art of Writing, written by Ray Bradbury, that catalogs a collection of essays about writing processes. One of the ways in the book to inspire plots was "to write nouns that interested him [Bradbury] on a note card and hang them in his office. He felt just having the word in his eyesight would get his mind working." Williams took this scheme and made it into "a writing exercise." In writing meetings, the staff would all enumerate 10 nouns on strips of paper and place them in a hat. The hat would be passed throughout and a writer would have a limited time to spawn an idea based on the noun he wrote. Drymon said "It would almost always start a discussion, and we wound up getting a lot of episodes out of it." Furthermore, Drymon said that Williams "really came up with a great addition to the process."

One time, Hillenburg came to Williams and said, "Why don't you go read a bunch of books about writing." Hillenburg wanted to keep the enthusiasm in the writing room, because, according to Williams, "sometimes it can be a slog." She went off, read more books about writing, and came up with two more exercises for writing meetings.

=== Animation and design ===
The animation was handled overseas in South Korea at Rough Draft Studios. In the first season, SpongeBob was animated using cel animation. The show switched over to digital ink and paint for its second season in 2000. Executive producer Paul Tibbitt, in 2009, said "[...] The first season of SpongeBob was done the old-fashioned way on cells, and every cell had to be part-painted, left to dry, paint some other colors. It's still a time-consuming aspect of the process now, but the digital way of doing things means it doesn't take long to correct." The season was storyboarded and written by Sherm Cohen, Derek Drymon, Steve Fonti, Stephen Hillenburg, Chuck Klein, Jay Lender, Chris Mitchell, Mark O'Hare, Aaron Springer, Paul Tibbitt, Ennio Torresan, Vincent Waller, and Erik Wiese. (Note: Information is taken from the opening and ending credits of each episode.)

When the crew began production on the pilot, they were tasked to design the stock locations where "[...] the show would return to again and again, and in which most of the action would take place, such as the Krusty Krab and SpongeBob's pineapple house." Hillenburg had a "clear vision" of what he wanted the show to look like. The idea was "to keep everything nautical" so the crew used lots of rope, wooden planks, ships' wheels, netting, anchors, and boilerplate and rivets.

The season marked the introduction of the "sky flowers" as the main background. It first appeared in the pilot and has since become a common feature throughout the series. When series background designer Kenny Pittenger was asked "What are those things?", he answered, "They function as clouds in a way, but since the show takes place underwater, they aren't really clouds." Since the show was influenced by tiki, the background painters have to use a lot of pattern. Pittenger said, "So really, the sky flowers are mostly a whimsical design element that Steve [Hillenburg] came up with to evoke the look of a flower-print Hawaiian shirt—or something like that. I don't know what they are either."

== Reception ==
The season was critically acclaimed. Three of its episodes won Best Sound Editing in Television Animation at the 2000 Golden Reel Awards. It consisted of the episodes "Mermaid Man and Barnacle Boy" and "Pickles" for Music, while the "Karate Choppers" won for the Sound. In 2001, "Rock Bottom" and "Arrgh!" also won the Golden Reel Awards for Best Sound Editing in Television Animation — Sound, while "Fools in April" and "Neptune's Spatula" were nominated for Best Sound Editing in Television Animation — Music.

In his review for the Variety, Noel Holston said "[The show] is smarter and freakier than most of the prime-time animated series that have popped up in the past year." Furthermore, most of the first season DVD reviews were positive towards the series as being one of the best American comedy shows. In a DVD review by Bill Treadway for DVD Verdict, he called the show "the best animated American comedy since The Simpsons, it is a claim I stand behind." Treadway said the show is "accessible to all" that "adults will enjoy the witty satire and sly in-jokes subtly inserted into every episode." He also mentioned that "children will love the bright colors, spunky pace, and lively characters" and that "parents will not have to worry about violence or crude humor." Jason Bovberg of DVD Talk called SpongeBob SquarePants "the coolest Saturday morning cartoon since the heyday of Warner Bros." In a separate review for the season's DVD release, Bovberg "highly recommended" the set and wrote "I love the show so much, I can't see any way around giving this one a recommendation." Bovberg was particular on the exclusion of the pilot episode "Help Wanted", saying "But why is 'Help Wanted' missing? I suppose I'll have to buy a "theme" disc down the road to secure that one. Sigh." Furthermore, he described it as "the only disappointment of the set." Ron J. Epstein, also from DVD Talk, said that the character of SpongeBob is "one of the strangest cartoon characters I have ever had the pleasure to watch." He said that "Unlike most cartoons today, SpongeBob SquarePants caters to both a child and an adult audience."

In his review for The Washington Post, Michael Cavna rewatched the pilot episode "Help Wanted" in 2009 and said "so much of the style and polish are already in place." He ranked the episode at No. 3 at his The Top Five SpongeBob Episodes: We Pick 'Em list. Nancy Basile of About.com said "[The] humor and optimistic essence of SpongeBob is evident even in this first episode."

== Episodes ==
The episodes are ordered below according to Nickelodeon's packaging order, and not their original production or broadcast order.

No. overall	No. in season	Title	Animation direction by	Written by	Original release date	Prod. code	U.S. viewers (millions)
1	1	"Help Wanted" (Note: Originally called "Pilot")	Alan Smart	Written by : Stephen Hillenburg, Derek Drymon, & Tim Hill; Storyboarded by : Derek Drymon; Stephen Hillenburg (director)	May 1, 1999	PILOT (1997 version); 2515–127 (1999 version)	2.96 2.14 (HH) (Note: (HH) denotes the amount of households that an episode was viewed in on premiere.)
1	1	"Reef Blower" (Note: Originally called "Pilot Extension," "1A extension," and "Reef Blowers")	Fred Miller & Tom Yasumi	Written by : Stephen Hillenburg, Derek Drymon, & Tim Hill; Storyboarded by : Jay Lender; Paul Tibbitt (director)	May 1, 1999	2515–126	2.96 2.14 (HH)
1	1	"Tea at the Treedome" (Note: Originally called "Tea at the Tree Dome")	Edgar Larrazabal; Tom Yasumi (Note: Later reruns, The Complete 1st Season DVD, The First 100 Episodes DVD, and 10 Happiest Moments DVD versions.)	Written by : Peter Burns, Mr. Lawrence, & Paul Tibbitt; Storyboarded by : Mark O'Hare; Paul Tibbitt (director)	May 1, 1999	2515–101	2.96 2.14 (HH)
"Help Wanted": An eccentric sea sponge named SpongeBob SquarePants attempts to get a job at a local fast food restaurant called the Krusty Krab, with encouragement from his best friend, a starfish named Patrick. Mr. Krabs, the owner of the restaurant, and Squidward Tentacles, a Krusty Krab employee and SpongeBob's next-door neighbor, consider SpongeBob unqualified for the job and send him on a fool's errand to return with a special mechanical spatula. Later, crowds of ravenous anchovies stop by the Krusty Krab and demand to be fed. SpongeBob somehow finds the spatula and utilizes it to fulfill the anchovies' hunger. He is then welcomed by Mr. Krabs as his new fry cook, much to Squidward's dismay. Note: Nickelodeon showcased the original version of this episode during a screening event in Austin, Texas, alongside the series premiere of CatDog between April 18–26, 1998. "Reef Blower": Wishing to keep his front yard clean, Squidward finds a small sea shell and throws it into SpongeBob's yard. SpongeBob notices the shell and decides to use his high powered electric "reef blower" to remove the shell from his yard. Squidward is unaware what havoc is to ensue because of his small act and how it will ruin his quiet day. This episode notably contains no dialogue. "Tea at the Treedome": SpongeBob meets and befriends a squirrel named Sandy Cheeks. Sandy invites SpongeBob over to her treedome for tea, but when he arrives, he is surprised to find that there is no water in the treedome. He tries to act like he is used to Sandy's air, despite needing water to breathe. Patrick later comes into the treedome, not knowing that there is no water in there. Sandy finds SpongeBob and Patrick dried up, so she gives them "water helmets" to solve the problem.
2	2	"Bubblestand" (Note: Originally called "Bubbles")	Tom Yasumi	Written by : Ennio Torresan, Erik Wiese, Stephen Hillenburg, Derek Drymon & Tim Hill; Storyboarded by : Erik Wiese; Ennio Torresan (director)	July 17, 1999	2515–105	2.51 (Note: This episode also received 1.9 million viewers with children aged 2 through 11.)
2	2	"Ripped Pants"	Edgar Larrazabal	Written by : Paul Tibbitt & Peter Burns; Storyboarded by : Mark O'Hare; Paul Tibbitt (director)	July 17, 1999	2515–106	2.51
"Bubblestand": One day, SpongeBob builds and opens a stand for blowing bubbles, charging 25 cents per bubble, much to Squidward's dismay. Patrick comes to the stand and asks to try it out but fails miserably. SpongeBob offers to teach him and shows off his particular bubble-blowing technique that allows the user to blow bubbles into various shapes and sizes. Squidward attempts to impress them by blowing a bubble without SpongeBob's method, but fails. Eventually, he blows an enormous bubble by utilizing all of the techniques SpongeBob had taught Patrick and screaming at the bubble wand in anger. SpongeBob and Patrick congratulate Squidward, who thanks them and walks back into his house. However, the gigantic bubble engulfs Squidward's house, unearthing it and sending it up in the air. "Ripped Pants": While at Goo Lagoon, SpongeBob accidentally rips his pants while trying to impress Sandy, causing everyone to laugh hysterically. SpongeBob leaves feeling embarrassed and sad, but a fish compliments him for the good laugh, making him realize the comedic potential of his accidental stunt, causing him to continue to repeatedly rip his pants intentionally as a joke. The joke is initially enjoyed by the residents of Goo Lagoon, but it soon becomes old and eventually goes too far when SpongeBob pretends to die while surfing, driving the beachgoers away, including Sandy. Later, he meets the three "biggest losers on the beach", and they ask SpongeBob what happened to him. SpongeBob tells his story and apologizes through a song, winning back Sandy and the rest of the beachgoers.
3	3	"Jellyfishing" (Note: Originally called "Jelly Fishing")	Alan Smart	Written by : Steve Fonti, Chris Mitchell, Peter Burns & Tim Hill; Storyboarded by : Chris Mitchell; Steve Fonti (director)	July 31, 1999	2515–103	2.89 2.24 (HH)
3	3	"Plankton!" (Note: Originally called "Deep Cover")	Edgar Larrazabal	Written by : Ennio Torresan, Erik Wiese & Mr. Lawrence; Storyboarded by : Erik Wiese; Ennio Torresan (director)	July 31, 1999	2515–114	2.89 2.24 (HH)
"Jellyfishing": SpongeBob and Patrick take Squidward, who is recovering from a bicycle accident in a full body cast, on a "jellyfishing" trip (a sport involving the capture of jellyfish). When they arrive in the Jellyfish Fields, a jellyfish stings Squidward, so he goes after it for revenge. He manages to catch the jellyfish, and bangs his net triumphantly against a queen jellyfish. The queen jellyfish chases after him, attacking him with a massive sting off screen, which SpongeBob, Patrick and the jellyfish all witness. The next day, the bandaged SpongeBob and Patrick go to the now life-support-bound Squidward's house to apologize, only to be chased away by the jellyfish caught by Squidward. As Squidward laughs about it, he is discovered and stung by the queen jellyfish again. "Plankton!": It is mass chaos at the Krusty Krab when Plankton, Mr. Krabs' business rival, tries to steal the Krabby Patty formula for his own restaurant, the Chum Bucket. At night, Plankton attempts to make friends with SpongeBob by asking him for a Krabby Patty, but he loudly and boldly refuses and runs back home. Later that night, Plankton enters SpongeBob's head through a pore and makes his way to SpongeBob's brain. He attaches a mind control device to the brain and bends SpongeBob to his will, forcing him to walk to the Krusty Krab, get a Krabby Patty, and bring it to the Chum Bucket, where he intends to force SpongeBob to drop the Krabby Patty into an analyzer revealing the ingredients of whatever is to put into it. SpongeBob feels sorry for letting down the Krabby Patty, and his appetizing description of the sandwich causes a hungry Plankton to leap out of SpongeBob's head towards the sandwich. He lands in his own analyzer and becomes trapped in his computer Karen. SpongeBob then leaves as Plankton begs for him to return with the Patty.
4	4	"Naughty Nautical Neighbors" (Note: Originally called "Friendly Fire")	Fred Miller	Written by : Sherm Cohen, Aaron Springer & Mr. Lawrence; Storyboarded by : Aaron Springer; Sherm Cohen (director)	August 7, 1999	2515–116	2.83 2.07 (HH)
4	4	"Boating School"	Tom Yasumi	Written by : Ennio Torresan Jr., Erik Wiese & Mr. Lawrence; Storyboarded by : Erik Wiese; Ennio Torresan Jr. (director)	August 7, 1999	2515–104	2.83 2.07 (HH)
"Naughty Nautical Neighbors": Squidward plays a cruel prank on SpongeBob and Patrick, destroying their friendship. They then fight over who is Squidward's best friend. Squidward invites them to a dinner party to repair their friendship. "Boating School": SpongeBob has to go to Boating School, but has failed his driving test 37 times. He shares this info with Patrick, who decides to secretly give SpongeBob instructions during the test via walkie-talkie. Upon realizing that he has been cheating, SpongeBob goes into hysterics and drives wildly all over the course, while his driving teacher Mrs. Puff (Mary Jo Catlett) tries desperately to stop him. SpongeBob refuses to listen, causing him to crash the boat and fail the test again.
5	5	"Pizza Delivery"	Sean Dempsey	Written by : Sherm Cohen, Aaron Springer & Peter Burns; Storyboarded by : Aaron Springer; Sherm Cohen (director)	August 14, 1999	2515–107	2.47
5	5	"Home Sweet Pineapple" (Note: Originally called "Home")	Tom Yasumi	Written by : Ennio Torresan Jr., Erik Wiese & Mr. Lawrence; Storyboarded by : Erik Wiese; Ennio Torresan Jr. (director)	August 14, 1999	2515–124	2.47
"Pizza Delivery": The Krusty Krab receives a call from a customer ordering a pizza, so Mr. Krabs decides to have Squidward and SpongeBob deliver it. While on the way delivering the pizza, SpongeBob and Squidward get stranded in a desert, and Squidward tries to eat the pizza. Squidward becomes increasingly annoyed over SpongeBob's survival skills, but is impressed when SpongeBob manages to use a rock to return home. When they finally reach the customer's house, the customer gets angry that he did not get the drink he supposedly also ordered. SpongeBob cries because the customer does not take the pizza. Angered that the customer made SpongeBob cry and after all they went through to deliver the pizza, Squidward knocks on the door and throws the pizza in the customer's face. As they leave, SpongeBob tells Squidward that it is time to return to work, and the latter groans in displeasure when it's revealed the house they delivered to is across the street from the Krusty Krab. "Home Sweet Pineapple": A horde of hungry nematodes come to town and consume SpongeBob's pineapple house (and other things). After this happens, SpongeBob reluctantly plans to move back in with his parents, though he will miss his old house and friends dearly. Squidward is delighted by the thought of SpongeBob moving. Nevertheless, SpongeBob attempts to stay with Patrick, only for the arrangement to become unsuitable. Squidward refuses to allow SpongeBob to stay with him. On the day he is supposed to leave town, SpongeBob finds a small pebble left from his house, and buries it where his house used to be. SpongeBob begins to cry, and his tears are absorbed by the pebble (which is actually a seed), causing his pineapple house to grow back.
6	6	"Mermaid Man and Barnacle Boy" (Note: Originally called "The Return of Mermaid Man and Barnacle Boy")	Sean Dempsey	Written by : Paul Tibbitt, Mark O'Hare & Mr. Lawrence; Storyboarded by : Mark O'Hare; Paul Tibbitt (director)	August 21, 1999	2515–119	2.94 2.17 (HH)
6	6	"Pickles"	Tom Yasumi	Written by : Steve Fonti, Chris Mitchell & Peter Burns; Storyboarded by : Chris Mitchell & Jay Lender; Steve Fonti (director)	August 21, 1999	2515–111	2.94 2.17 (HH)
"Mermaid Man and Barnacle Boy": SpongeBob and Patrick want to meet their favorite retired superheroes, Mermaid Man and Barnacle Boy, who are now elderly and living in a retirement home. They try to bring them out of retirement, much to the annoyance of the superheroes, who only want their TV repaired. SpongeBob and Patrick go through various antics to help them out of retirement and eventually succeed when the two heroes treat them as villains and use their superpowers to force them away from the retirement home. SpongeBob and Patrick then go home and watch The New Adventures of Mermaid Man & Barnacle Boy on TV, which consists of the two playing checkers and complaining that their telephone needs to be fixed. "Pickles": Bubble Bass, a picky overweight bass and an old rival of SpongeBob, comes to the Krusty Krab for a Krabby Patty. Bubble Bass says SpongeBob forgot the pickles, and SpongeBob, shocked by this, loses his confidence. Mr. Krabs is worried about losing money, so he approaches SpongeBob to explain to him that if he remembers how to make a Krabby Patty, he will be back in order. It takes days, but SpongeBob eventually learns how to make a Krabby Patty properly again. When Bubble Bass comes again to challenge SpongeBob, he again says that SpongeBob forgot the pickles. However, SpongeBob is absolutely sure that he had put pickles in the Krabby Patty. He then grabs Bubble Bass' tongue to reveal to everyone in the Krusty Krab that Bubble Bass had hidden the pickles under his tongue all along. Embarrassed by the revelation, Bubble Bass quickly runs away. The customers cheer for SpongeBob's return, but not for Squidward taking his place when he was gone.
7	7	"Hall Monitor"	Edgar Larrazabal	Written by : Chuck Klein, Jay Lender & Mr. Lawrence; Storyboarded by : Jay Lender; Chuck Klein (director)	August 28, 1999	2515–108	3.08 2.12 (HH)
7	7	"Jellyfish Jam" (Note: Originally called "Jellyfish Jamboree")	Fred Miller	Written by : Ennio Torresan, Jr., Erik Wiese & Peter Burns; Storyboarded by : Erik Wiese; Ennio Torresan, Jr. (director)	August 28, 1999	2515–118	3.08 2.12 (HH)
"Hall Monitor": Mrs. Puff makes SpongeBob a hall monitor for the day. SpongeBob takes this to mean the whole town as well and patrols the town, but it results in chaos. SpongeBob invites Patrick to help him patrol as a deputy. They learn that a maniac has been causing trouble around town. Eventually, SpongeBob sees a wanted poster for himself and realizes that he is the maniac. The police arrive to arrest him, and Mrs. Puff appears to explain the situation to them, saying that he is her responsibility. The police interpret this as taking responsibility for the crimes, and she is arrested for the following six months. "Jellyfish Jam": SpongeBob brings home a wild jellyfish and throws a big dance party. However, the wild jellyfish becomes addicted to the tune of the dance music, and continues through the night before inviting more jellyfish to come to the party, which lasts for 18 hours and annoys Squidward. The next morning, SpongeBob wakes up to find his living room filled with hundreds of dancing jellyfish and attempts to make them leave, but he ends up breaking the music record-player, causing the jellyfish to become angry. After his pet snail Gary calms them down by clicking his eyes together and producing a beat, SpongeBob uses Gary to lead the Jellyfish back to Jellyfish Fields.
8	8	"Sandy's Rocket"	Tom Yasumi	Written by : Sherm Cohen, Aaron Springer & Peter Burns; Storyboarded by : Aaron Springer; Sherm Cohen (director)	September 17, 1999	2515–110	2.40
8	8	"Squeaky Boots" (Note: Originally called "The Squeaky Boots")	Fred Miller	Written by : Steve Fonti, Chris Mitchell & Mr. Lawrence; Storyboarded by : Chris Mitchell; Steve Fonti (director)	September 17, 1999	2515–102	2.40
"Sandy's Rocket": SpongeBob and Patrick sneak onto Sandy's rocket ship one night. When they do, Patrick accidentally starts the engine but they crash-land back in Bikini Bottom. Thinking they are on the moon, they capture everyone (including Sandy) believing they are aliens. Eventually, SpongeBob believes that Patrick is an alien. SpongeBob starts the rocket to return home, and when it reaches the moon, the rocket crashes on top of it. SpongeBob looks out the window and realizes his mistake as the captured "aliens" like a word with him. "Squeaky Boots": Mr. Krabs gives his daughter Pearl a pair of old boots as a cheap birthday present, but when she refuses to take them, he gives them to SpongeBob, claiming that the boots are the boots of a true fry cook. SpongeBob enjoys the boots and the high-pitched, "squeaky" sounds they make, but the noises that the boots make begin to annoy Mr. Krabs, eventually to the point that he cannot stand the sounds anymore. Because of this, Mr. Krabs steals the boots and buries them underneath the Krusty Krab, reminiscent of The Tell-Tale Heart. The next day, SpongeBob comes to work crying because he could not find the boots. Mr. Krabs, feeling guilty, begins going crazy and hearing everything as squeaks, and eventually confesses that he stole the boots, then proceeding to fry the boots in a deep fryer and eat them.
9	9	"Nature Pants"	Sean Dempsey	Written by : Paul Tibbitt, Mark O'Hare & Peter Burns; Storyboarded by : Mark O'Hare; Paul Tibbitt (director)	September 11, 1999	2515–120	2.54
9	9	"Opposite Day"	Tom Yasumi	Written by : Chuck Klein, Jay Lender & Mr. Lawrence; Storyboarded by : Jay Lender; Chuck Klein (director)	September 11, 1999	2515–112	2.54
"Nature Pants": SpongeBob decides that he wants to live in the wild with jellyfish, so he quits his job at the Krusty Krab and leaves his old life to live in Jellyfish Fields. Mr. Krabs is confident that he will return within a day, but Patrick and Sandy have a set-up picnic to try to convince SpongeBob to move back. SpongeBob resists every effort to get him to come home but soon finds out that living among the jellyfish is not quite as he had dreamed. He realizes that he had a great life that he gave up, so he returns home. When he gets home he is surprised by his friends who forgive and hug him, only for them to start itching from the poisonous sea urchins that SpongeBob picked up whilst living amongst jellyfish. "Opposite Day": Squidward plans to move out of Bikini Bottom after being annoyed by SpongeBob and Patrick. However, he is warned by the real estate broker that if his home is surrounded by bad neighbors, the house cannot be sold. Squidward tells SpongeBob that it is "Opposite Day", and that everyone must act opposite to how they usually act. SpongeBob later tells Patrick about Opposite Day. When Squidward is busy and the real estate broker arrives, SpongeBob and Patrick both pretend to be Squidward, giving her a tour of the house, while describing it negatively and doing the opposite of what she asks. Then, the real Squidward arrives and begs the broker to sell his house, but, feeling deceived, she refuses, leaving Squidward stuck where he is. In response, Squidward tries to run over the duo with a bulldozer, while sarcastically saying "Happy Opposite Day."
10	10	"Culture Shock"	Edgar Larrazabal	Written by : Paul Tibbitt, Mark O'Hare & Mr. Lawrence; Storyboarded by : Mark O'Hare; Paul Tibbitt (director)	September 18, 1999	2515–122	2.41
10	10	"F.U.N." (Note: Originally called "My Fair Plankton")	Fred Miller	Written by : Sherm Cohen, Aaron Springer & Peter Burns; Storyboarded by : Aaron Springer; Sherm Cohen (director)	September 18, 1999	2515–121	2.41
"Culture Shock": The Krusty Krab has a lack of customers, and Mr. Krabs tells Squidward and SpongeBob that the Krusty Krab needs ideas to bring in some more. Squidward suggests a talent show at the Krusty Krab, and Mr. Krabs agrees. When the night of the show arrives, it isn't very successful, but Squidward promises Mr. Krabs that he saved "the best for last". The final act features Squidward dancing to various genres of music, but the audience quickly hates it. They begin throwing tomatoes at him, making Squidward leave the stage. SpongeBob goes onstage and begins cleaning the mess, which the audience enjoys, making the show a success in the end. "F.U.N.": After another failed attempt by the evil Plankton to steal a Krabby Patty, SpongeBob comes to the conclusion that the reason why Plankton is evil is because he is just lonely and needs a friend. After SpongeBob befriends Plankton, the two engage in a variety of friendship activities. Unfortunately, Mr. Krabs must show SpongeBob Plankton's true colors.
11	11	"MuscleBob BuffPants" (Note: Originally called "Pump It Up")	Edgar Larrazabal	Written by : Ennio Torresan, Jr., Erik Wiese & Mr. Lawrence; Storyboarded by : Erik Wiese; Ennio Torresan, Jr. (director)	October 2, 1999	2515–123	2.61
11	11	"Squidward the Unfriendly Ghost" (Note: Originally called "Squid's House of Wax")	Fred Miller	Written by : Sherm Cohen, Aaron Springer & Peter Burns; Storyboarded by : Aaron Springer; Sherm Cohen (director)	October 2, 1999	2515–115	2.61
"MuscleBob BuffPants": SpongeBob orders fake arms with inflatable muscles to impress everyone. When Sandy sees him, she decides to enroll the both of them in a competition, where each contestant must throw an anchor the farthest they can. SpongeBob realizes that the competition would expose the fact that his "muscles" are fake. At the competition, every contestant heaves their anchors far, but with his fake muscles, SpongeBob cannot even lift his anchor. He inflates his arms to strengthen himself, but instead they explode, revealing him as a fraud. "Squidward the Unfriendly Ghost": SpongeBob and Patrick think Squidward is dead after ruining his self-replica and that the real Squidward is a ghost. Squidward decides to take advantage of their mistake by telling them that he will spare them if they accept all of his commands. SpongeBob and Patrick decide that since Squidward is a vengeful spirit, they need to have Squidward put to rest. Squidward eventually admits his charade, but SpongeBob and Patrick believe that Squidward is simply in denial about his death. SpongeBob blows a giant bubble that engulfs Squidward and sends him floating up to the sky.
12	12	"The Chaperone" (Note: Originally called "Chaperone")	Sean Dempsey	Written by : Sherm Cohen, Aaron Springer & Peter Burns; Storyboarded by : Aaron Springer; Sherm Cohen (director)	March 8, 2000	2515–113	3.23
12	12	"Employee of the Month"	Sean Dempsey	Written by : Paul Tibbitt & Mr. Lawrence; Storyboarded by : Mark O'Hare, Ennio Torresan Jr. & Erik Wiese; Paul Tibbitt (director)	March 8, 2000	2515–125	3.23
"The Chaperone": SpongeBob is asked by Mr. Krabs to take Pearl to her school prom after she was dumped by her boyfriend. When they arrive, SpongeBob clumsily ruins Pearl's experience, making him break down. Feeling sorry for him, Pearl attempts to console him and restore his confidence. Pearl and SpongeBob perform a dance, which everyone else soon begins doing. However, this results in many injuries and mass destruction. An angry mob forms and throws Pearl and SpongeBob out of the building. As SpongeBob walks Pearl home, he apologizes, and Pearl says that even though it was a disaster, it was really fun. "Employee of the Month": SpongeBob has always been the best employee of the Krusty Krab, but Squidward decides that he wants the Employee of the Month Award for a change. The two argue about the award and set several traps for each other as they both desperately try to reach the Krusty Krab first. They get there at the same time, just as Mr. Krabs opens the doors. They begin overworking themselves in an attempt to impress him, doing more harm than good, scaring Mr. Krabs out of his wits in the process. They then try to make as many Krabby Patties as possible, eventually causing the Krusty Krab to explode and much to the joy of the customers, it starts raining Krabby Patties.
13	13	"Scaredy Pants"	Sean Dempsey	Written by : Paul Tibbitt & Peter Burns; Storyboarded by : Mark O'Hare; Paul Tibbitt (director)	October 28, 1999	2515–109	2.68
13	13	"I Was a Teenage Gary" (Note: Originally called "Critical Condition")	Edgar Larrazabal	Written by : Steve Fonti, Chris Mitchell & Mr. Lawrence; Storyboarded by : Chris Mitchell; Steve Fonti (director)	October 28, 1999	2515–117	2.68
"Scaredy Pants": SpongeBob is tired of always getting scared on Halloween and being called "Scaredy Pants", so he decides to dress like the Flying Dutchman to get revenge. For his costume, SpongeBob realizes that a real ghost has a round head, and that he has a square one. Patrick shaves SpongeBob's head, making it round. The real Flying Dutchman appears and explains to the people how offended he is by people dressing up as him for Halloween, and that SpongeBob's costume is the worst of all. He takes off SpongeBob's costume, which reveals that his brain is exposed as a result of Patrick's shaving. Subsequently, everyone runs away, including the Dutchman, leaving SpongeBob satisfied to have finally succeeded in scaring everyone, even Patrick. "I Was a Teenage Gary": SpongeBob trusts Squidward to take good care of Gary while he is at a jellyfishing convention. However, Squidward neglects him and Gary ends up falling sick. SpongeBob calls the veterinarian, who gives him a syringe filled with snail plasma. Squidward accidentally injects the serum into SpongeBob's nose, causing SpongeBob to turn into a snail. The transformed SpongeBob approaches Squidward, who, in the process of running away in fear, accidentally injects himself with the serum, and thus turns into a snail as well. The three snails are last seen meowing a song on a fence at night, which annoys Patrick. Hoping for them to "clam up", Patrick throws a boot that misses everyone except for Squidward, who is hit and knocked off the fence.
14	14	"SB-129" (Note: Originally called "SpongeBob 3000" or "How I Learned to Stop Worrying and Love the Sponge")	Tom Yasumi	Written by : Aaron Springer, Erik Wiese & Mr. Lawrence; Storyboarded by : Erik Wiese; Aaron Springer (director)	December 31, 1999	2515–129	1.52
14	14	"Karate Choppers"	Tom Yasumi	Written by : Aaron Springer, Erik Wiese & Merriwether Williams; Storyboarded by : Erik Wiese; Aaron Springer (director)	December 31, 1999	2515–135	1.52
"SB-129": After being invited by SpongeBob and Patrick to go jellyfishing, Squidward refuses and wants to be away from them. He hides inside of the Krusty Krab's freezer, getting trapped in there. Two thousand years later, the freezer finally rusts open and Squidward finds himself in the future. Attempting to get back home using a time machine, he accidentally goes too far back in time. After meeting prehistoric versions of SpongeBob and Patrick, he successfully gets the time machine working again, only to break it "mid-flight". As a result, he experiences "a surreal realm of nothingness". Suddenly realizing his loneliness, he attempts to escape and lands in the time machine room. He begs it to return to the present, which it does. However, he finds that he is now famous for inventing jellyfishing after having shown it to prehistoric SpongeBob and Patrick. "Karate Choppers": SpongeBob is constantly practicing karate with Sandy, but he gets increasingly paranoid of Sandy's attacks, which is affecting his job at the Krusty Krab. Mr. Krabs orders SpongeBob to stop doing karate after attacking the customers and threatening to fire him. When Sandy does karate, she refuses to listen to SpongeBob, and Mr. Krabs ultimately fires SpongeBob and he runs around bawling as a result of his job loss due to karate. Sandy admits to Mr. Krabs it was actually her fault for not listening and tells him to give SpongeBob another chance, in which Mr. Krabs does so under the condition of no more karate. They attempt to forget karate and go to the park instead. However, while slicing sandwiches, they begin doing karate again, which is seen by Mr. Krabs. SpongeBob gives Mr. Krabs permission to fire him. However, Mr. Krabs finds out that karate chops can replace knives, so he doesn't fire SpongeBob and instead hires Sandy to slice Krabby Patties alongside SpongeBob, which earns him more money.
15	15	"Sleepy Time" (Note: Originally called "Sleepytime")	Edgar Larrazabal	Written by : Paul Tibbitt, Ennio Torresan Jr. & Mr. Lawrence; Storyboarded by : Paul Tibbitt & Ennio Torresan Jr. (also directors)	January 17, 2000	2515–141	2.89
15	15	"Suds"	Edgar Larrazabal	Written by : Paul Tibbitt, Ennio Torresan Jr. & Mr. Lawrence; Storyboarded by : Paul Tibbitt & Ennio Torresan Jr. (also directors)	January 17, 2000	2515–132	2.89
"Sleepy Time": When SpongeBob goes to sleep, he gains the ability of astral projection (because of Mrs. Puff) and ventures into his friends' dreams. After a journey to his friends' dreams, SpongeBob then goes back to his own dream. When he wakes up, everyone is in his room, upset that he messed up their dreams except for Patrick, who only wanted a quarter. "Suds": SpongeBob tries to fall asleep but fails. He decides that eating a seanut butter and jellyfish jelly sandwich would help, but he accidentally leaves his refrigerator door open after falling asleep. The open refrigerator gives him a bad case of a sickness similar to the common cold called the suds, causing him to sneeze bubbles out of his pores. Unfortunately, Patrick foolishly tells SpongeBob that going to the doctor is a terrifying experience. SpongeBob asks Patrick to cure him, but he only makes his condition worse. Sandy then takes SpongeBob to a real doctor, who prescribes the "sponge treatment", involving SpongeBob being used to clean dishes, a car, a man's back, a human foot, and the floor. The treatment cures SpongeBob completely and he is given a free lollipop. Patrick wants his own lollipop, so he fakes having the symptoms of the suds and gets the painful "starfish treatment" in which he is used to clean a cactus and a toilet.
16	16	"Valentine's Day"	Fred Miller	Written by : Chuck Klein, Jay Lender & Merriwether Williams; Storyboarded by : Jay Lender; Chuck Klein (director)	February 14, 2000	2515–128	2.75
16	16	"The Paper" (Note: Originally called "Lemons Out of Lemonade")	Fred Miller	Written by : Chuck Klein, Jay Lender & Mr. Lawrence; Storyboarded by : Jay Lender; Chuck Klein (director)	February 14, 2000	2515–134	2.75
"Valentine's Day": SpongeBob and Sandy set up a Valentine's Day treat for Patrick, a hot-air balloon made completely of chocolate, at a Valentine's Day-themed park. Unfortunately, their plan is delayed, as the balloon is attacked by scallops. SpongeBob gives Patrick a handshake in order to keep the balloon a surprise. Patrick nearly goes insane with rage, but just before he attacks everybody, SpongeBob's treat for Patrick arrives, and Patrick becomes friends with SpongeBob and Sandy again. "The Paper": SpongeBob plays around with a gum wrapper Squidward threw on his yard, using his imagination to have fun and do amazing things with the paper. Squidward becomes jealous and attempts to take it back so that he can have fun too; however, SpongeBob refuses to give it back, as he promised not to. Squidward desperately begs SpongeBob for the paper, and is not successful until he agrees to trade everything he owns. However, Squidward does not have fun with the paper, and realizes that it is completely worthless.
17	17	"Arrgh!" (Note: Originally called "Argh!")	Sean Dempsey	Written by : Sherm Cohen, Vincent Waller & Merriwether Williams; Storyboarded by : Vincent Waller; Sherm Cohen (director)	March 15, 2000	2515–130	3.08 2.14 (HH)
17	17	"Rock Bottom" (Note: Originally called "The Bus" or "The Wrong Bus")	Tom Yasumi	Written by : Paul Tibbitt, Ennio Torresan & David Fain; Storyboarded by : Paul Tibbitt & Ennio Torresan (also directors)	March 15, 2000	2515–138	3.08 2.14 (HH)
"Arrgh!": SpongeBob, Patrick, and Mr. Krabs play a board game based on the legend of the Flying Dutchman, which involves an in-game treasure hunt. Mr. Krabs likes the game so much that he wants to go on a real treasure hunt. In their hunt, SpongeBob and Patrick find the treasure, but Mr. Krabs says that all of the treasure belongs to him. They begin fighting over the chest, and their arguing wakes up the Flying Dutchman, who appears and congratulates SpongeBob and Patrick for digging it up for him. He takes the treasure, but gives them two gold coins. Mr. Krabs asks for a reward, but receives only a tiny plastic treasure chest. "Rock Bottom": When a delightful day at the glove-themed amusement park called Glove World is over, SpongeBob and Patrick take the wrong bus when they are trying to go home and end up in the abyssal zone of Rock Bottom. Patrick gets on a bus to go home and accidentally leaves SpongeBob behind. SpongeBob makes several unsuccessful attempts to get on a bus. Meanwhile, he meets a friendly-looking anglerfish, who has SpongeBob's balloon from Glove World. The creature blows up the balloon, ties it to SpongeBob's wrist, and allows him to float up the cliff and back to Bikini Bottom.
18	18	"Texas"	Sean Dempsey	Written by : Sherm Cohen, Vincent Waller & David Fain; Storyboarded by : Vincent Waller; Sherm Cohen (director)	March 22, 2000	2515–139	3.10 2.11 (HH)
18	18	"Walking Small" (Note: Originally called "Walking Tall")	Sean Dempsey	Written by : Aaron Springer, Erik Wiese & Mr. Lawrence; Storyboarded by : Erik Wiese; Aaron Springer (director)	March 22, 2000	2515–133	3.10 2.11 (HH)
"Texas": Sandy is homesick and wishes she were back in Texas, singing a song about how much she misses home. SpongeBob attempts to cheer her up by organizing a Texas-themed surprise party at the Krusty Krab. SpongeBob and Patrick go to Sandy's house to ask her to come to the Krusty Krab with them, but she tells them that she is leaving Bikini Bottom to go back to Texas. SpongeBob and Patrick mock Texas and the intelligence of Texans, causing Sandy to chase them. The two lure Sandy back to the Krusty Krab, where the party is. Sandy realizes how much her underwater friends care about her, and that Bikini Bottom has become her true home, deciding to stay. "Walking Small": At Goo Lagoon, Plankton arrives to turn the beach into the future site of a Chum Bucket branch, demanding that everyone leave the beach. However, no one listens to him due to how small he is. He concludes that he needs someone big to help clear the beach for him, and encounters SpongeBob. Plankton decides to trick SpongeBob into being assertive in order to get the things that he wants. After a series of cruel and nasty actions by SpongeBob, everyone leaves the beach. Plankton then reveals his true intentions to SpongeBob, making him very upset. SpongeBob defeats Plankton by becoming "aggressively nice", performing kind actions that attract the people back to the beach. Plankton leaves the beach, disgusted by the overwhelming amount of kindness.
19	19	"Fools in April" (Note: Originally called "April Fools")	Fred Miller	Written by : Aaron Springer, Erik Wiese & Merriwether Williams; Storyboarded by : Erik Wiese; Aaron Springer (director)	April 1, 2000	2515–140	1.78
19	19	"Neptune's Spatula" (Note: Originally called "The Spatula and the Stove")	Fred Miller	Written by : Chuck Klein, Jay Lender & David B. Fain; Storyboarded by : Jay Lender; Chuck Klein (director)	April 1, 2000	2515–137	1.78
"Fools in April": At the Krusty Krab, SpongeBob pulls numerous playful and harmless pranks on people. Squidward gets so annoyed that he pulls his own cruel and nasty prank on SpongeBob in retaliation. It ends poorly as SpongeBob runs for home, physically and emotionally hurt and the customers sympathize with SpongeBob and disown Squidward. Squidward goes to see SpongeBob to apologize, but finds it impossible to say that he is sorry to him. He is able to say it by putting a bubble over his head so that SpongeBob cannot actually hear his apology. Squidward walks away, saying that his conscience is clear, but is confronted by memories of what he did. He goes back and genuinely apologizes to SpongeBob. Suddenly, SpongeBob fully opens his front door, revealing that everyone else is inside behind him and witnessed Squidward's apology. Squidward states that he was fooling them as well before running away to his house while laughing maniacally. "Neptune's Spatula": While at the Fry Cook Museum, SpongeBob pulls a legendary spatula out of a bucket of grease, summoning King Neptune. King Neptune is unconvinced of SpongeBob's skills and challenges SpongeBob to prove his ability, as he is not pleased to find that SpongeBob is the one destined to be his eternal fry cook. At the competition, King Neptune makes 1,000 burgers in the time it takes SpongeBob to make just one, winning the challenge. However, when Neptune shares his patties with the audience, they find that they taste terrible. Neptune is angered by this and tastes SpongeBob's patty, and finds it to be delicious. SpongeBob is declared the winner, but when he finds out that his friends cannot come with him to Atlantis, he refuses to go. He instead arranges for Neptune to be a trainee under him at the Krusty Krab.
20	20	"Hooky"	Edgar Larrazabal	Written by : Sherm Cohen, Vincent Waller & Merriwether Williams; Storyboarded by : Vincent Waller; Sherm Cohen (director)	February 23, 2001	2515–136	2.17
20	20	"Mermaid Man and Barnacle Boy II" (Note: Originally called "25 Words or Less")	Tom Yasumi	Written by : Chuck Klein, Jay Lender & Mr. Lawrence; Storyboarded by : Jay Lender; Chuck Klein (director)	March 3, 2001	2515–131	2.54
"Hooky": Mr. Krabs comes into the Krusty Krab warning everybody of the fishing hooks appearing in the waters surrounding Bikini Bottom. Patrick encourages SpongeBob to play on them with him, thinking it's a "carnival" and they are not dangerous. Mr. Krabs catches the two playing on the hooks, and tells them that if they get caught, they could be eaten, or turned into gift shop knick-knacks, or be packed in a tuna can. Mr. Krabs makes SpongeBob and Patrick promise to never play with the hooks again. The next day, SpongeBob tries to avoid the hooks, but gives into temptation and ends up getting caught on one. He runs to the Krusty Krab for help. The hook ends up removing SpongeBob's clothes in front of Pearl and her friends, and he runs naked to his house, humiliated by the incident. As it turns out, Squidward was the one fishing on Mr. Krabs' order in order to teach SpongeBob a lesson. Patrick, who had been caught on a hook earlier, returns home in a tuna can. "Mermaid Man and Barnacle Boy II": In a contest, SpongeBob wins a conch shell that can summon Mermaid Man and Barnacle Boy in emergencies. However, he abuses this privilege, constantly calling the superheroes to help with everyday tasks. Eventually, the two heroes are exhausted, and SpongeBob apologizes, explaining that he just wanted to spend time with them. As a result, they let SpongeBob join them on their daily patrol, but he ends up doing several accidental things, annoying them. At a diner, Mermaid Man and Barnacle Boy decide to "ditch" SpongeBob by asking him to search for their theme song on the jukebox while they flee the restaurant. Outside, however, they are attacked and trapped by their arch nemesis, the Dirty Bubble. SpongeBob comes outside to tell them and sees their predicament. He asks the Dirty Bubble for his autograph, saying that he is his favorite supervillain, and "accidentally" pops the Dirty Bubble with a pencil tip, saving the day.

== DVD release ==
The DVD boxset for season one was released by Paramount Home Entertainment and Nickelodeon in the United States and Canada in October 2003, two years after it had completed broadcast on television. The DVD release features bonus materials including audio commentaries, featurettes, and music videos. The pilot episode "Help Wanted" was excluded in the DVD release due to copyright issues. According to Derek Drymon, the episode was not included because Nickelodeon did not want to pay Tiny Tim's estate for the DVD rights. However, on the German release of the season one DVD, the episode "Help Wanted" actually is included. "Help Wanted" was later released on the SpongeBob SquarePants: The Complete 3rd Season DVD as a bonus feature on September 27, 2005. It was also released on the SpongeBob SquarePants: The First 100 Episodes DVD, alongside all the episodes of seasons one through five. The DVD included a featurette called "Help Wanted" the Seven Seas Edition that featured "Help Wanted" in numerous languages. The episode was also a bonus feature in the series DVD called SpongeBob SquarePants: 10 Happiest Moments that was released on September 14, 2010. Upon release, the DVD set was quickly sold out at Best Buy and was selling "briskly" at online retailers, including Amazon.com, Barnes & Noble and Walmart. In 2012, the DVD was released in slim packaging.

SpongeBob SquarePants: The Complete 1st Season
Set details			Special features
20 episodes (excluding "Help Wanted"); 3-disc set; 1.33:1 aspect ratio; Languages: English (Dolby Digital 2.0)			Audio commentaries for "Plankton!" and "Karate Choppers"; Featurettes: The Origin of SpongeBob SquarePants; Recollections From the First Season Crew; Everybody's Talking: The Voices Behind SpongeBob SquarePants; Drawing the Goo Lagoon; SpongeBob's Life Strategies; The Bikini Bottom's Up Tour; In the Key of Seas: Krusty Krab Karaoke; Music videos; Violent Femmes Sing SpongeBob; SpongeBob Scaredy Pants Music Video; SpongeBob Dancin' Pants Music Video
Release dates			Audio commentaries for "Plankton!" and "Karate Choppers"; Featurettes: The Origin of SpongeBob SquarePants; Recollections From the First Season Crew; Everybody's Talking: The Voices Behind SpongeBob SquarePants; Drawing the Goo Lagoon; SpongeBob's Life Strategies; The Bikini Bottom's Up Tour; In the Key of Seas: Krusty Krab Karaoke; Music videos; Violent Femmes Sing SpongeBob; SpongeBob Scaredy Pants Music Video; SpongeBob Dancin' Pants Music Video
Region 1	Region 2	Region 4	Audio commentaries for "Plankton!" and "Karate Choppers"; Featurettes: The Origin of SpongeBob SquarePants; Recollections From the First Season Crew; Everybody's Talking: The Voices Behind SpongeBob SquarePants; Drawing the Goo Lagoon; SpongeBob's Life Strategies; The Bikini Bottom's Up Tour; In the Key of Seas: Krusty Krab Karaoke; Music videos; Violent Femmes Sing SpongeBob; SpongeBob Scaredy Pants Music Video; SpongeBob Dancin' Pants Music Video
October 28, 2003	November 7, 2005	November 30, 2006	Audio commentaries for "Plankton!" and "Karate Choppers"; Featurettes: The Origin of SpongeBob SquarePants; Recollections From the First Season Crew; Everybody's Talking: The Voices Behind SpongeBob SquarePants; Drawing the Goo Lagoon; SpongeBob's Life Strategies; The Bikini Bottom's Up Tour; In the Key of Seas: Krusty Krab Karaoke; Music videos; Violent Femmes Sing SpongeBob; SpongeBob Scaredy Pants Music Video; SpongeBob Dancin' Pants Music Video
