= Lori Alan =

American actress

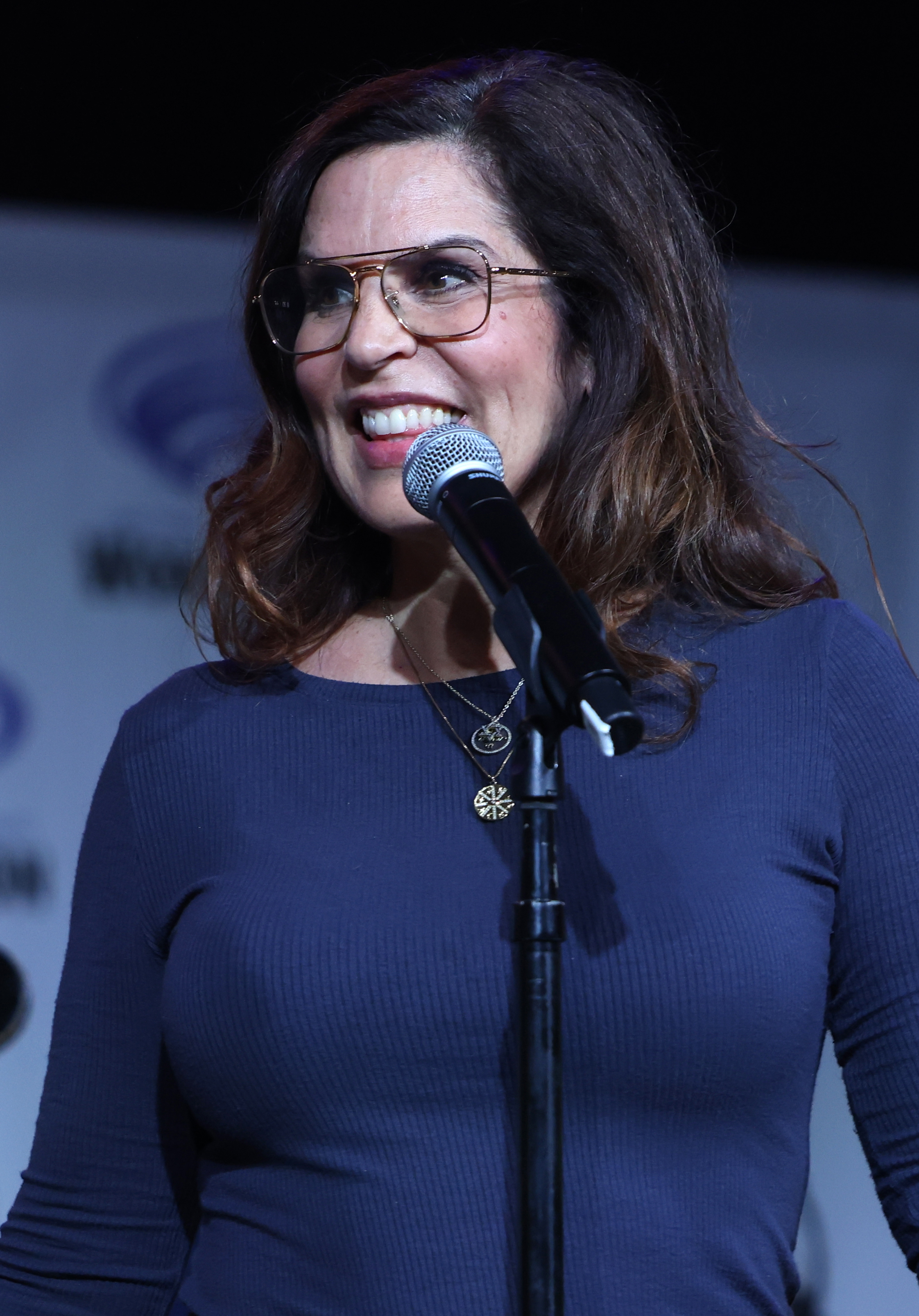
- Alan in 2025
- Born: July 18, 1966 (age 60); Potomac, Maryland, U.S.
- Education: New York University (BFA)
- Occupation: Actress
- Years active: 1990–present
- Spouse: Marc Katz (m. 2023)
- Website: www.lorialan.com

Lori Alan (born July 18, 1966) is an American actress. She has played a long-running role as Pearl Krabs from the animated television series SpongeBob SquarePants. She also voiced Diane Simmons from Family Guy, the Invisible Woman from Fantastic Four, and the Boss in the Metal Gear video game series.

== Early years ==
Alan had a mixed-faith family: her mother is a Southern Baptist and her father is Jewish.

Her father, Eliot, and her mother, Martha, were performers and supported her choice to be an actress. She started acting at age five, making her television debut in a Shakey's Pizza commercial.

She graduated from Winston Churchill High School in Potomac, attended Emerson College, and graduated cum laude from New York University's Tisch School of the Arts.

== Career ==
Alan's early experience included performing off-Broadway and as a member of the improv group the Groundlings.

Alan has done vocal work for over three decades. Her process of getting to the authentic personality of the character she is providing the voice for is to improvise and trust her own choices, something she learned at her first voice acting job.

Alan voices Pearl Krabs on SpongeBob SquarePants, Sue Richards (the Invisible Woman) on Marvel Comics' The Fantastic Four, newsreader-turned-murderer Diane Simmons on Family Guy, and the Boss in the Metal Gear series. Lori has done voices in feature films: Monsters University, Toy Story 3, Despicable Me 2, WALL-E, Inside Out, and the SpongeBob SquarePants film series. She has also voiced roles for Henry Hugglemonster, Cow and Chicken, Animaniacs, and Futurama. Her rendition of The Boss was rated as one of the top 25 "Greatest Acting Performances in Video Games" by Complex.

In 2005, she joined Warren Beatty, Rob Reiner, Kurtwood Smith and Jason George to help voice commercials against proposals made by California governor Arnold Schwarzenegger.

In 2014, she won a Voice Arts Award (VAA) for outstanding body of work and outstanding national television commercial.

Alan's on-camera roles include Desperate Housewives, Ray Donovan, Comedy Central's Workaholics, Bones, Southland, CSI, 90210, Law & Order: LA, Law & Order and many more. On stage credits include The Pee-wee Herman Show, solo show Lori Alan: The Musical, Queen Celia in the hit musical Sneaux!, and the award-winning musical Reefer Madness. Her 1999 performance in Reefer Madness as a "Reefer Madam" was praised by the Los Angeles Times.

She revisited her role in the Reefer Madness tenth Anniversary Cast in 2015. Her vocals on the song "The Stuff" was considered both sultry and comical by Broadway World.

== Personal life ==
Alan is active in animal rescue and welfare causes. She has spoken out against animal cruelty and has campaigned for the meat charity World Protection for Dogs and Cats in the Meat Trade. She is also on the board of Pickle Pants Rescue, an animal rescue organization in Los Angeles.

== Filmography ==
=== Film ===
Year	Title	Role	Notes
1994	Holy Matrimony	Cleopatra	
1994	The Rockford Files: "I Still Love L.A."	Karen Kupfer	Television film
1995	Boys on the Side	Girl with Attitude	
1995	Father of the Bride Part II	Wife Mrs. Habib	
1996	The Oz Kids Toto Lost in New York	Mother and Wife (voice)	Direct-to-video film
1996	The Oz Kids Virtual Oz	Auntie Scraps (voice)	Direct-to-video film
1996	The Oz Kids Underground Adventure	Auntie Scraps (voice)	Direct-to-video film
1996	Garage Sale	Gwen	Short film
1996	Larry & Steve	Cindy (voice)	Short film
1996	Larry & Steve	Loudspeaker (voice)	Short film
2001	The Fluffer	Harmony	
2004	Comic Book: The Movie	Anita Levine	Direct-to-video film
2004	The SpongeBob SquarePants Movie	Pearl Krabs (voice)	
2005	Family Guy Presents Stewie Griffin: The Untold Story	Diane Simmons (voice)	Direct-to-video film
2008	WALL-E	Axiom Passenger #8	
2008	Tokyo Mater	Additional Voices	Short film
2009	Cloudy with a Chance of Meatballs	Additional Voices	
2009	Divorce Sale	Hot Chick	Short film
2010	Pee-Wee Gets an iPad!	Chairry (voice)	Short film
2010	Pee-Wee Gets an iPad!	Magic Screen (voice)	Short film
2010	Toy Story 3	Mrs. Anderson (voice)	
2013	Monsters University	Bus Driver (voice)	
2013	Despicable Me 2	Additional Voices	
2013	Dean Slater: Resident Advisor	Mrs. Harris	
2013	Meet My Rapist	Mom	Short film
2015	The SpongeBob Movie: Sponge Out of Water	Pearl Krabs (voice)	
2015	Inside Out	Mom's Sadness (voice)	
2015	Minions	Additional Voices	
2015	Riley's First Date?	Mom's Sadness (voice)	Short film
2017	Tom and Jerry: Willy Wonka and the Chocolate Factory	Mrs. Teevee (voice)	Direct-to-video film
2017	Despicable Me 3	Additional Voices	
2019	Toy Story 4	Mrs. Anderson (voice)	
2020	The SpongeBob Movie: Sponge on the Run	Pearl Krabs (voice)	Scene deleted
2025	Plankton: The Movie	Pearl Krabs (voice)	
2025	The SpongeBob Movie: Search for SquarePants	Pearl Krabs (voice)	Uncredited role
2026	Hoppers	Mabel's Mother (voice)	
2026	Toy Story 5	Mrs. Anderson (voice)	

=== Television ===
Year	Title	Role	Notes
1990	Law & Order	Martha	Episode: "Kiss the Girls and Make Them Die"
1993	Phenom	Beverly	Episode: "Answered Prayers"
1994	Dave's World	The T.A.	Episode: "Family Membership"
1994	SWAT Kats: The Radical Squadron	Lt. Felina Feral (voice)	6 episodes
1995	The George Carlin Show	Nurse	Episode: "George Tells the Truth"
1995	Ned and Stacey	Theresa	Episode: "Reality Check"
1995	Buford's Got a Gun	Estelle	Television short
1994–1996	The Fantastic Four	Invisible Woman (voice)	27 episodes
1996	Boston Common	Liz	3 episodes
1996	Aaahh!!! Real Monsters	Mom, Girl (voice)	Episode: "Eye Full of Wander/Lifestyles of the Rich and Scary"
1996	Touched by an Angel	Rachel Carson	Episode: "Into the Light"
1997	The Angry Beavers	Porcupine, Skunk (voice)	Episode: "Enter the Daggett/Bugaboo"
1997	Cow and Chicken	Winney (voice)	Episode: "Chicken's First Kiss"
1997	What a Cartoon!	Cindy (voice)	Episode: "Larry & Steve"
1997–1999, 2001	Hey Arnold!	Brooke Lloyd, School Secretary, Chocolate Woman, Police Officer Pudney, Announcer (voice)	5 episodes
1998	Animaniacs	Sharon Stone (voice)	Episode: "Hooray for North Hollywood"
1999–2002, 2005–2010	Family Guy	Diane Simmons, additional voices	63 episodes
1999	Johnny Bravo	Production Assistant, Robot Walla (voice)	Episode: "Karma Krisis/A Star Is Bruised/The Prince and the Pinhead"
1999	The Kids from Room 402	Nurse Pitts (voice)	Episode: "Son of Einstein"
1999	The Brothers Flub	Additional voices	
1999–present	SpongeBob SquarePants	Pearl Krabs, additional voices	Main role
2000	PB&J Otter	Dr. Molar Fox (voice)	Episode: "Butter's First Check-Up/The Legend of Ponce de L'Otter"
2001	Will and Grace	Jean	Episode: "Coffee & Commitment"
2002	The Tick	District Attorney	Episode: "The Tick vs. Justice"
2002	Charmed	Cynthia	Episode: "Lost and Bound"
2002	Sabrina, the Teenage Witch	Sabrina's Car (voice)	Episode: "Driving Mr. Goodman"
2002	Rocket Power	Game Voice (voice)	Episode: "Sim Sammy/Otto Hangs 11"
2002	3-South	Felicity, Various (voice)	2 episodes
2003	Friends	Sonya	Episode: "The One Where Monica Sings"
2003	Good Morning, Miami	Loretta	Episode: "Mutt and Jake"
2003	Six Feet Under	Macy's Saleswoman	Episode: "The Eye Inside"
2004	ChalkZone	Brain (voice)	Episode: "Skrawl's Brain"
2004	The Wild Thornberrys	Elder's Daughter (voice)	Episode: "Eliza Unplugged"
2005	The Grim Adventures of Billy & Mandy	Librarian, Rosella, Girl #2 (voice)	Episode: "Duck!"
2005	Stroker and Hoop	Leslie, Helena St. Chloe-Butz, Coed, Grandma, Reporter, Woman, Porche, Tour Guide, Sunshine (voice)	3 episodes
2005	CSI: Crime Scene Investigation	Valerie Esposito	Episode: "Still Life"
2006	W.I.T.C.H.	Brenda (voice)	Episode: "U is for Undivided"
2007	Cory in the House	Mrs. Flowers	4 episodes
2007–2009	Rick & Steve: The Happiest Gay Couple in All the World	Ivory, Nerds, Dr. Joy, Various Characters, Dixie, Nerd, Eunice, Mail Lady (voice)	7 episodes
2008	Days of Our Lives	Java Café Patron	Episode: "Episode #1.10942"
2009	Chuck	Judy Roberts	Episode: "Chuck Versus the First Kill"
2009	Chowder	Lady #2, Lady #6, Lady #8 (voice)	Episode: "Won Ton Bombs"
2009	Southland	D.A. Deborah Janowitz	3 episodes
2009	The Closer	Kathy Weber	Episode: "Strike Three"
2010–2011	Mater's Tall Tales	Additional voices	4 episodes
2010	The Hard Times of RJ Berger	Linda Robbins	2 episodes
2010	90210	Realtor	Episode: "Holiday Madness"
2010	Futurama	Additional voices	
2010	Fanboy & Chum Chum	Additional voices	
2011	BlackBoxTV	Joanna Haywood	Episode: "The Family Circus"
2011	McCracken Live!	Lauren Hanson	Episode: "The Pilot Lot"
2011	Law & Order: LA	Robbi Nathan	Episode: "Benedict Canyon"
2011	Workaholics	Betsy Russ	Episode: "6 Hours Til Hedonism II"
2011–2012	Toy Story Toons	Bonnie's Mom / Tae-Kwon Doe (voice)	Main role
2012	School Board	Susan	4 episodes
2012	Bones	Gina Carson	Episode: "The Gunk in the Garage"
2013	Rolling with Dad	Brenda Stickle	Television short
2013	Ray Donovan	Darlene	Episode: "Road Trip"
2013	Mighty Med	Mrs. Gleason	2 episodes
2013	Doc McStuffins	Gloria the Gorilla	Episode: "You Crack Me Up"
2013	Toy Story of Terror!	Bonnie's Mom (voice)	Television special
2013–2014	Henry Hugglemonster	Momma (voice)	43 episodes
2014	Castle	Ms. Papen	Episode: "Smells Like Teen Spirit"
2014	Acting Dead	Zombietologist	2 episodes
2014	Grey's Anatomy	Ellen Weaver	Episode: "Don't Let's Start"
2014	Toy Story That Time Forgot	Bonnie's Mom (voice)	Television special
2015	Natasha	Natasha's Mother	Episode: "A Finale"
2015	The League	Mrs. Shtotelman	Episode: "Deflategate"
2015–2017	Nicky, Ricky, Dicky & Dawn	Ms. Bing	2 episodes
2016	Son of Zorn	Laseron (voice)	Episode; "Return to Orange County"
2017	Colony	Elaine	Episode; "Eleven.Thirteen"
2018	A.P. Bio	Didi	2 episodes
2018	The Adventures of Kid Danger	Police Dispatcher, Carol, additional voices	2 episodes
2019	Shameless	Stacy Baer	
2020	Archibald's Next Big Thing	Gale St. Salty / Walker (voice)	Episode; "The Royal Strutters/Impromptu Cruise"
2021–2024	Kamp Koral: SpongeBob's Under Years	Baby Pearl (voice)	13 episodes
2021–present	The Patrick Star Show	Pearl Krabs, additional voices	4 episodes
2021	Curb Your Enthusiasm	Young Larry's Mom Rose	Episode: "Man Fights Tiny Woman"
2023	Pokémon Concierge	Watanabe	English dub
2025	Bat-Fam	Livewire (voice)	

=== Web ===
Year	Title	Role	Notes
2010	Hollywood is Like High School with Money	Iris Whitaker	9 episodes

=== Video games ===
Year	Title	Role	Notes
1995	Shannara	Lessa	
2004	Metal Gear Solid 3: Snake Eater	The Boss	
2005	Area 51	Additional voices	
2006	Metal Gear Solid 3: Subsistence	The Boss	
2006	Family Guy Video Game!	Diane Simmons	
2008	CSI: NY	Amy Yablans, Olivia Moretti, Eloise Stanwick-Lourdes	
2009	Marvel: Ultimate Alliance 2	Newscaster	
2010	Metal Gear Solid: Peace Walker	The Boss/The Boss AI Pod	
2012	Kinect Rush: A Disney-Pixar Adventure	Bonnie's Mom	
2015	Metal Gear Solid V: The Phantom Pain	The Boss AI Pod	
2023	SpongeBob SquarePants: The Cosmic Shake	Pearl Krabs	
2025	Nicktoons & The Dice of Destiny	Pearl Krabs	
2025	SpongeBob SquarePants: Titans of the Tide	Pearl Krabs, Kids	
2026	Screamer	Quinn Connolly	
2026	Grand Theft Auto VI	The Local Population	
