= SpongeBob SquarePants season 7 =

Season of television series

SpongeBob SquarePants
- Season 7
- DVD cover
- Showrunner: Paul Tibbitt
- Starring: Tom Kenny; Bill Fagerbakke; Rodger Bumpass; Clancy Brown; Mr. Lawrence; Jill Talley; Carolyn Lawrence; Mary Jo Catlett; Lori Alan
- No. of episodes: 26 (50 segments)

Release
- Original network: Nickelodeon
- Original release: July 19, 2009 – June 11, 2011

Season chronology
- ← Previous; Season 6 Next → Season 8

The seventh season of the American animated television series SpongeBob SquarePants, created by marine biologist and animator Stephen Hillenburg, began airing on Nickelodeon in the United States on July 19, 2009, and ended on June 11, 2011. It contained 26 half-hour episodes, with a miniseries titled Legends of Bikini Bottom. The series chronicles the exploits and adventures of the title character and his various friends in the fictional underwater city of Bikini Bottom.

The season was executive produced by series creator Hillenburg and writer Paul Tibbitt, who also acted as the showrunner. In 2011, Legends of Bikini Bottom, an anthology series consisting of episodes from the season, was launched. A number of guest stars appeared on the season's episodes. Several compilation DVDs that contained episodes from the season were released. The SpongeBob SquarePants: Complete Seventh Season DVD was released in Region 1 on December 6, 2011, Region 2 on September 17, 2012, and Region 4 on September 12, 2012.

The series won the 2010 Kids' Choice Awards in the category of Favorite Cartoon. The episode "That Sinking Feeling" was nominated at the 63rd Primetime Emmy Awards for Outstanding Short-format Animated Program. Furthermore, at the 38th Annie Awards, the show won for Best Animated Television Production for Children.

== Production ==
The season aired on Nickelodeon, which is owned by Viacom, and was produced by United Plankton Pictures and Nickelodeon Animation Studio. The season's executive producers were series creator Stephen Hillenburg and Paul Tibbitt, who also acted as the series' showrunner. On March 13, 2008, during the broadcast of the sixth season, the network renewed the show for a seventh season, with 26 episodes in order. Cyma Zarghami, president of Nickelodeon & MTVN Kids and Family Group, said, "The strength of the Nickelodeon brand comes from how we embrace everything important to kids, and how we are with them virtually everywhere they want us to be. Our open philosophy to give audiences access to everything they love, and our commitment to making relevant and innovative content, have put us at the top of cable, VOD and online. Nickelodeon has strong momentum as a brand and as a business, and we have a great foundation built on great talent and relationships with some of the best creative leaders in our industry."

In a statement, Brown Johnson, president of animation for Nickelodeon, said, "We are thrilled to be making another season of SpongeBob SquarePants–a series we hope to make for a long time." On July 19, 2009, the season premiered with "Tentacle-Vision" and "I Heart Dancing". The former was written by Luke Brookshier, Nate Cash and Derek Iversen, with Alan Smart serving as animation director. "I Heart Dancing" was written by Casey Alexander, Zeus Cervas, Mr. Lawrence, and was directed by Tom Yasumi. "Growth Spout", "Stuck in the Wringer", "Someone's in the Kitchen with Sandy", and "The Inside Job" also premiered on the same day as part of the Ultimate SpongeBob Sponge Bash marathon, that celebrate the series' tenth anniversary including the premiere of ten brand new episodes.

In 2011, Nickelodeon debuted an anthology series, Legends of Bikini Bottom, of six seventh-season episodes in the show. It was released on January 27, 2011, on the online social networking service Facebook before it aired on the cable channel Nickelodeon. "Trenchbillies" was the first episode to air on Facebook and was written by Aaron Springer and Richard Pursel, with Andrew Overtoom serving as animation director. Nickelodeon said on January 27 that SpongeBob SquarePants has more than 16 million "friends" on Facebook. The decision of airing the series online was aimed at attracting "the young and the restless hooked to the internet and the social media." In a press release, Brown Johnson said, "The anthology format of Legends of Bikini Bottom provides a great opportunity to try something new where we can give SpongeBob's 16 million fans on Facebook a first look, in addition to new content on-air". Each episode was available for two weeks on Facebook. The other four called "Sponge-Cano!", "The Main Drain", "The Monster Who Came to Bikini Bottom" and "Welcome to the Bikini Bottom Triangle" premiered on Nickelodeon in an hour-long special on January 28, 2011.

Animation was handled overseas in South Korea at Rough Draft Studios. Animation directors credited with episodes in the seventh season included Andrew Overtoom, Alan Smart, and Tom Yasumi. Episodes were written by a team of writers, which consisted of Casey Alexander, Steven Banks, Luke Brookshier, Nate Cash, Zeus Cervas, Sean Charmatz, Derek Iversen, Mr. Lawrence, Dani Michaeli, Richard Pursel, and Aaron Springer. The season was storyboarded by Alexander, Brookshier, Cash, Cervas, Charmatz, and Springer. (Note: Information is taken from the opening credits of each episode.)

== Cast ==
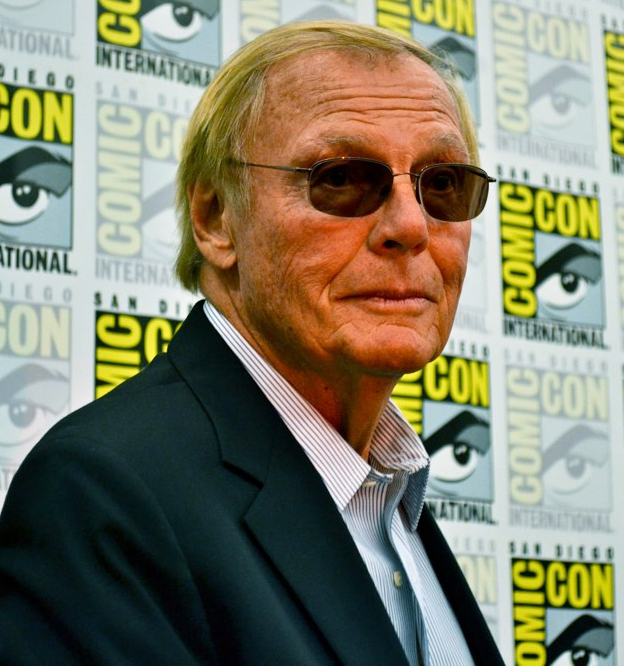
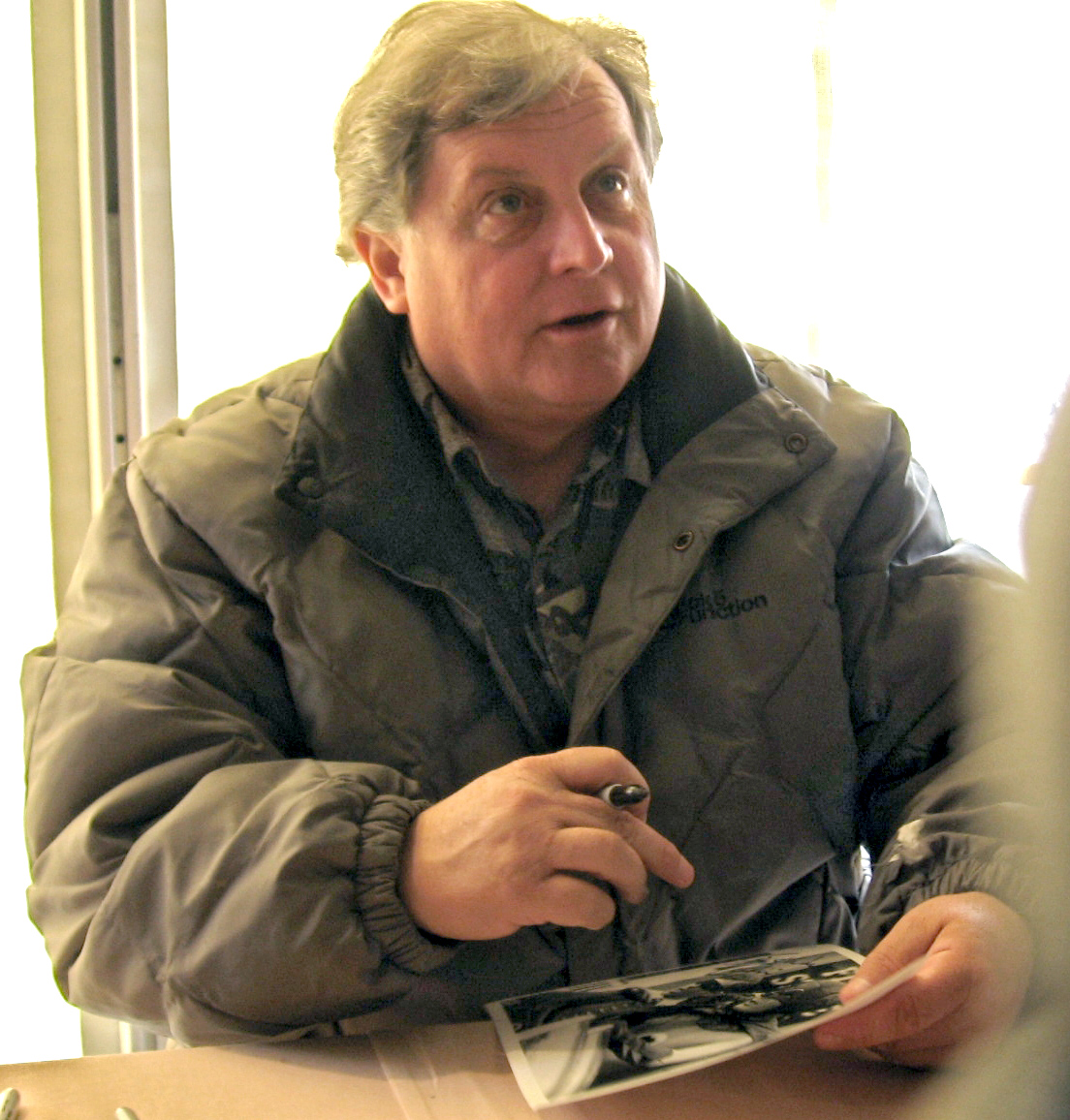
In the seventh season episode "Back to the Past", the young Mermaid Man and Barnacle Boy were voiced by Adam West and Burt Ward, the original Batman and Robin, respectively.

The seventh season featured Tom Kenny as the voice of the title character SpongeBob SquarePants and his pet snail Gary. SpongeBob's best friend, a starfish named Patrick Star, was voiced by Bill Fagerbakke, while Rodger Bumpass played the voice of Squidward Tentacles, an arrogant and ill-tempered octopus. Other members of the cast were Clancy Brown as Mr. Krabs, a miserly crab obsessed with money who is SpongeBob's boss at the Krusty Krab; Mr. Lawrence as Plankton, a small green copepod and Mr. Krabs' business rival; Jill Talley as Karen, Plankton's sentient computer sidekick; Carolyn Lawrence as Sandy Cheeks, a squirrel from Texas; Mary Jo Catlett as Mrs. Puff, SpongeBob's boating school teacher; and Lori Alan as Pearl, a teenage whale who is Mr. Krabs' daughter.

In addition to the regular cast members, episodes feature guest voices from many ranges of professions, including actors, musicians, and artists. For instance, in the episode "Back to the Past", Ernest Borgnine and Tim Conway returned, reprising their respective roles as Mermaid Man and Barnacle Boy. The episode is also guest starred by the original Batman series stars Adam West as the young Mermaid Man and Burt Ward as the young Barnacle Boy. Borgnine and Conway later voiced their recurring roles in the episode "The Bad Guy Club for Villains". Brian Doyle-Murray also reprised his role as the Flying Dutchman for "The Curse of Bikini Bottom". Comedian and actress Laraine Newman voices the character of Plankton's grandma in "Gramma's Secret Recipe". In the anthology series Legends of Bikini Bottom, actresses Amy Sedaris and Ginnifer Goodwin guest star. Sedaris appears in the episode "Trenchbillies" as the voice of Ma Angler. Goodwin also guest stars as the voice of a purple-haired mermaid in the episode "Welcome to the Bikini Bottom Triangle". She lends her voice to a teenage mermaid who steals from others through Bikini Bottom's version of the Bermuda Triangle. In "The Curse of Hex", Saturday Night Live's Kristen Wiig guest stars as the voice of Madame Hagfish. Marion Ross voiced her recurring role as Grandma SquarePants, SpongeBob's grandmother, in "The Abrasive Side".

== Episodes ==
The episodes are ordered below according to Nickelodeon's packaging order, and not their original production or broadcast order.

No. overall	No. in season	Title	Animation direction by	Written by	Original release date	Prod. code	U.S. viewers (millions)
Episodes 1–13
127	1	"Tentacle-Vision"	Alan Smart	Written by : Luke Brookshier, Nate Cash, and Derek Iversen; Storyboarded by : Luke Brookshier and Nate Cash (directors)	July 19, 2009	223–704	5.17
127	1	"I ♥ Dancing" "I Heart Dancing"	Tom Yasumi	Written by : Casey Alexander, Zeus Cervas, and Mr. Lawrence; Storyboarded by : Casey Alexander and Zeus Cervas (directors)	July 19, 2009	223–703	2.89
"Tentacle-Vision": Squidward becomes the star of his own talk show, but everyone else wants to join in and they ruin the set. In the end, the show gets restructured into a televised house party, without Squidward. "I ♥ Dancing": Squidward is envious when he learns that SpongeBob is invited to a dance audition, and deliberately overworks him so that he can take his place. Squidward passes the audition, but is then given to a production led by his arch rival Squilliam Fancyson, who clearly plans to overwork him just as he did to SpongeBob.
128	2	"Growth Spout"	Andrew Overtoom	Written by : Aaron Springer and Richard Pursel; Storyboarded by : Aaron Springer (director)	July 19, 2009	223–705	4.95
128	2	"Stuck in the Wringer"	Alan Smart	Written by : Zeus Cervas, Sean Charmatz, and Derek Iversen; Storyboarded by : Zeus Cervas and Sean Charmatz (directors)	July 19, 2009	223–701	5.37
"Growth Spout": As Pearl goes through her growth spurt one night, her hunger gets worse. Mr. Krabs tries to find enough food to feed his daughter. Wanting to save money, he raids his friends' houses to see if there is any food he can steal that can satisfy Pearl. "Stuck in the Wringer": After slipping on a bar of soap, SpongeBob gets wedged in his wringer. His condition only gets worse when Patrick, who fails to understand the situation, uses "Forever Glue" to permanently trap SpongeBob inside it. SpongeBob tries to go about his usual day, but as a result falls upon hardships.
129	3	"Someone's in the Kitchen with Sandy"	Tom Yasumi	Written by : Casey Alexander, Zeus Cervas, and Dani Michaeli; Storyboarded by : Casey Alexander and Zeus Cervas (directors)	July 19, 2009	223–706	5.09
129	3	"The Inside Job"	Andrew Overtoom	Written by : Luke Brookshier, Nate Cash, and Mr. Lawrence; Storyboarded by : Luke Brookshier and Nate Cash (directors)	July 19, 2009	223–702	5.17
"Someone's in the Kitchen with Sandy": As part of yet another Krabby Patty secret formula stealing scheme, Plankton purloins Sandy's fur to impersonate her and trick SpongeBob to give him the formula. Meanwhile, Sandy, who is naked, searches for the culprit around the town. She finds her fur and Plankton at the Krusty Krab where she is arrested for public nudity. "The Inside Job": Plankton tries to launch himself into Mr. Krabs to try to find the secret formula but ends up in SpongeBob instead, so he searches through him, such as his heart and brain, to find where it is kept.
130	4	"Greasy Buffoons"	Tom Yasumi	Written by : Aaron Springer and Derek Iversen; Storyboarded by : Aaron Springer (director)	November 27, 2009	223–709	4.25
130	4	"Model Sponge"	Tom Yasumi	Written by : Casey Alexander, Zeus Cervas, and Mr. Lawrence; Storyboarded by : Casey Alexander and Zeus Cervas (directors)	November 27, 2009	223–712	4.25
"Greasy Buffoons": After emptying the Krusty Krab's grease trap, Mr. Krabs illegally dumps it behind the Chum Bucket, which starts a greasy war between Mr. Krabs and Plankton to increase the taste of their food with greasy entrées. "Model Sponge": After overhearing Mr. Krabs talking on the phone, SpongeBob thinks that he has been fired from his job at the Krusty Krab. As a result, SpongeBob tries a career at being a model in a kitchen sponge commercial.
131	5	"Keep Bikini Bottom Beautiful"	Alan Smart	Written by : Luke Brookshier, Nate Cash, and Dani Michaeli; Storyboarded by : Luke Brookshier and Nate Cash (directors)	January 2, 2010	223–713	4.28
131	5	"A Pal for Gary"	Andrew Overtoom	Written by : Casey Alexander, Zeus Cervas, and Richard Pursel; Storyboarded by : Casey Alexander and Zeus Cervas (directors)	January 2, 2010	223–708	4.28
"Keep Bikini Bottom Beautiful": Squidward is sentenced to do community service and clean up garbage after getting caught by the police in an act of littering. However, his arch-rival Squilliam distracts him by boasting about his progress and a statue depicting himself. "A Pal for Gary": Thinking that Gary is lonely when he is at work, SpongeBob gets his pet a playmate but ignores a dangerous warning about it. Whenever SpongeBob is not present, the new pet terrorizes Gary, and SpongeBob thinks Gary is being mean to it as a result.
132	6	"Yours, Mine, and Mine"	Andrew Overtoom	Written by : Luke Brookshier, Nate Cash, and Steven Banks; Storyboarded by : Luke Brookshier and Nate Cash (directors)	September 11, 2010	223–711	4.53
132	6	"Kracked Krabs"	Alan Smart	Written by : Luke Brookshier, Nate Cash, and Mr. Lawrence; Storyboarded by : Luke Brookshier and Nate Cash (directors)	September 11, 2010	223–707	4.53
"Yours, Mine, and Mine": SpongeBob buys a meal for himself and Patrick to share, and gets a special toy called "Patty Pal" along with it. However, as SpongeBob soon finds out, Patrick's idea of sharing is that SpongeBob buys something for the two of them, and Patrick keeps that something all for himself. "Kracked Krabs": When Mr. Krabs is nominated at the Cheapest Crab Awards, SpongeBob goes with him to the Cheapest Crab Convention for the award ceremony.
133	7	"The Curse of Bikini Bottom"	Andrew Overtoom	Written by : Luke Brookshier, Nate Cash, and Mr. Lawrence; Storyboarded by : Luke Brookshier and Nate Cash (directors)	October 24, 2009	223–717	4.95
133	7	"Squidward in Clarinetland"	Tom Yasumi	Written by : Casey Alexander, Zeus Cervas, and Dani Michaeli; Storyboarded by : Casey Alexander and Zeus Cervas (directors)	March 24, 2010	223–718	3.68
"The Curse of Bikini Bottom": When SpongeBob and Patrick anger the Flying Dutchman by accidentally shaving off his beard, he turns SpongeBob and Patrick into ghosts until his beard grows back in 1000 years. At first, they have much fun as ghosts, but eventually realize the hardships of "living without souls." Upon learning that the Dutchman is only upset that he can't go on a date due to the loss of his beard, SpongeBob and Patrick decide to help him look good for the date. "Squidward in Clarinetland": At the Krusty Krab, Squidward demands Mr. Krabs to provide him a locker to place his clarinet. Mr. Krabs is forced to grant him his request, but Squidward must also share the locker with SpongeBob. Eventually, Squidward's clarinet goes missing and he learns that SpongeBob took it. He chases SpongeBob around the locker, and travels through different dimensions to track down SpongeBob and get his clarinet back.
134	8	"SpongeBob's Last Stand"	Andrew Overtoom and Tom Yasumi	Written by : Aaron Springer, Steven Banks, and Derek Iversen; Storyboarded by : Aaron Springer (director)	April 22, 2010 (Note: This episode was first released on the SpongeBob's Last Stand DVD on March 16, 2010.)	223–714	4.76
134	8	"SpongeBob's Last Stand"	Andrew Overtoom and Tom Yasumi	Written by : Aaron Springer, Steven Banks, and Derek Iversen; Storyboarded by : Aaron Springer (director)	April 22, 2010	223–715	4.76
SpongeBob and Patrick learn that Plankton is building a new highway that will destroy the Jellyfish Fields. As a result, they protest against its construction. SpongeBob discovers that it is another scheme to steal the Krabby Patty formula.
135	9	"Back to the Past"	Alan Smart	Written by : Casey Alexander, Zeus Cervas, and Dani Michaeli; Storyboarded by : Casey Alexander and Zeus Cervas (directors)	February 15, 2010	223–710	3.63
135	9	"The Bad Guy Club for Villains"	Alan Smart	Written by : Casey Alexander, Zeus Cervas, and Dani Michaeli; Storyboarded by : Casey Alexander and Zeus Cervas (directors)	February 15, 2010	223–724	3.63
"Back to the Past": SpongeBob and Patrick go back in time to see their favorite superheroes, Mermaid Man and Barnacle Boy, as young adults. However, they accidentally alter history and make Man Ray the ruler of Bikini Bottom. "The Bad Guy Club for Villains": SpongeBob and Patrick watch Mermaid Man and Barnacle Boy fight villains and criminals in a lost episode of a show within a show called The Adventures of Mermaid Man & Barnacle Boy.
136	10	"A Day Without Tears"	Tom Yasumi	Written by : Aaron Springer and Steven Banks; Storyboarded by : Aaron Springer (director)	March 22, 2010	223–721	3.64
136	10	"Summer Job"	Alan Smart	Written by : Casey Alexander, Zeus Cervas, and Derek Iversen; Storyboarded by : Casey Alexander and Zeus Cervas (directors)	March 23, 2010	223–716	3.27
"A Day Without Tears": SpongeBob spends one entire morning crying over the littlest things, annoying Squidward. So Squidward bets SpongeBob that he cannot go a single day without crying. If Squidward wins, SpongeBob will have to do his chores for a year, and if SpongeBob wins the bet, Squidward has to come to SpongeBob's house for a sleepover. Squidward tries to cheat and force SpongeBob crying, but he manages to resist every single time, and wins the bet. "Summer Job": When trying to escape from SpongeBob during the start of summer break, Mrs. Puff accidentally wrecks the Krusty Krab's front doors. To pay off the damage she caused, she is forced to work through her vacation by assisting SpongeBob in the kitchen.
137	11	"One Coarse Meal"	Andrew Overtoom	Written by : Casey Alexander, Zeus Cervas, and Mr. Lawrence; Storyboarded by : Casey Alexander and Zeus Cervas (directors)	March 25, 2010	223–722	4.19
137	11	"Gary in Love"	Andrew Overtoom	Written by : Casey Alexander, Zeus Cervas, and Derek Iversen; Storyboarded by : Casey Alexander and Zeus Cervas (directors)	February 6, 2010	223–720	5.52
"One Coarse Meal": When Mr. Krabs discovers that Plankton is afraid of whales, he uses it to his advantage with his daughter, Pearl. However, when his daughter refuses, Mr. Krabs disguises himself as Pearl to torment his rival, leaving SpongeBob to defend him over it. "Gary in Love": When SpongeBob takes Gary to a "snail park," Gary meets another snail named Mary and falls in love with her. When at home, Gary thinks about and misses Mary, so he sneaks out to find her. Meanwhile, SpongeBob discovers that Gary is missing, and searches for him.
138	12	"The Play's the Thing"	Tom Yasumi	Written by : Luke Brookshier, Nate Cash, and Steven Banks; Storyboarded by : Luke Brookshier and Nate Cash (directors)	March 26, 2010	223–723	3.25
138	12	"Rodeo Daze"	Alan Smart	Written by : Luke Brookshier, Nate Cash, and Richard Pursel; Storyboarded by : Luke Brookshier and Nate Cash (directors)	February 6, 2010	223–719	5.52
"The Play's the Thing": Squidward performs a play at the Krusty Krab, but must serve the customers and act on stage simultaneously. "Rodeo Daze": When Sandy receives a letter that she is invited to a rodeo, she leaves and heads to Texas. However, SpongeBob thinks the rodeo is too dangerous for Sandy, so he tries to save her by bringing all of Bikini Bottom to Texas.
139	13	"Gramma's Secret Recipe"	Alan Smart	Written by : Aaron Springer and Dani Michaeli; Storyboarded by : Aaron Springer (director)	July 6, 2010	223–725	3.62
139	13	"The Cent of Money"	Andrew Overtoom	Written by : Casey Alexander, Zeus Cervas, and Dani Michaeli; Storyboarded by : Casey Alexander and Zeus Cervas (directors)	July 7, 2010	223–731	2.49
"Gramma's Secret Recipe": Plankton tricks SpongeBob by pretending that he is his great-grandmother in order to get the Krabby Patty secret formula. "The Cent of Money": SpongeBob is walking his pet snail, Gary, and coins start sticking to Gary's shell. When Mr. Krabs learns this, he uses Gary to steal coins from others all around town. In the end, it is revealed that Gary ate SpongeBob's very powerful Mermaid Man and Barnacle Boy fridge magnet.
Legends of Bikini Bottom
140	14	"The Monster Who Came to Bikini Bottom"	Andrew Overtoom	Written by : Aaron Springer and Dani Michaeli; Storyboarded by : Aaron Springer (director)	January 28, 2011 (Note: This episode was first released on the SpongeBob SquarePants: Legends of Bikini Bottom DVD on November 16, 2010.)	223–743	6.05
140	14	"Welcome to the Bikini Bottom Triangle"	Alan Smart	Written by : Luke Brookshier, Nate Cash, and Dani Michaeli; Storyboarded by : Luke Brookshier and Nate Cash (directors)	January 28, 2011	223–742	6.05
"The Monster Who Came to Bikini Bottom": Patrick accidentally creates a monster after contaminating a coral group with radioactive waste. While Patrick befriends "Rarrg", the other citizens of Bikini Bottom try to drive it away. "Welcome to the Bikini Bottom Triangle": SpongeBob discovers that Mr. Krabs, along with a few other things, has gone missing. While SpongeBob and Squidward investigate, they get accidentally sucked into an alternate realm called the "Bikini Bottom Triangle." There, they discover a quintet of mermaids, who steal various items and stockpile them in the island.
141	15	"The Curse of the Hex"	Tom Yasumi	Written by : Aaron Springer and Richard Pursel; Storyboarded by : Aaron Springer (director)	June 11, 2011	223–745	4.45
141	15	"The Main Drain"	Alan Smart	Written by : Luke Brookshier, Nate Cash, and Mr. Lawrence; Storyboarded by : Luke Brookshier and Nate Cash (directors)	January 28, 2011	223–746	6.00
"The Curse of the Hex": After being forbidden to order at the Krusty Krab at closing time, an evil hagfish known as Madame Hagfish curses the restaurant. The next day, unnatural events occur at the restaurant, which concerns Mr. Krabs. He and SpongeBob set out to find the hagfish in hope that she will lift the curse. "The Main Drain": Mr. Krabs warns SpongeBob and Patrick about a "Main Drain," a drain at the bottom of the ocean that once destroyed Bikini Bottom. Curious, SpongeBob and Patrick set out to find the drain.
142	16	"Trenchbillies"	Andrew Overtoom	Written by : Aaron Springer and Richard Pursel; Storyboarded by : Aaron Springer (director)	January 27, 2011 (Facebook); January 29, 2011 (Nickelodeon)	223–741	6.55
142	16	"Sponge-Cano!"	Tom Yasumi	Written by : Casey Alexander, Zeus Cervas, and Derek Iversen; Storyboarded by : Casey Alexander and Zeus Cervas (directors)	January 28, 2011	223–744	6.00
"Trenchbillies": After falling off a cliff, SpongeBob and Patrick are held prisoners by a backward gang of trench-dwelling hillbillies called "trenchbillies," led by their matriarch Ma Angler. The two are sentenced to a series of challenges, which they must complete in order to be set free. "Sponge-Cano!": Squidward, who dubs himself as "the most miserable person in Bikini Bottom", complains about everything around him, when a more serious problem arises in the form of a volcanic eruption. A mysterious dolphin warrior predicts that they must sacrifice "the most miserable person" to stop the volcano, and Squidward tries to take back his statement.
Episodes 17–26
143	17	"The Great Patty Caper"	Tom Yasumi and Alan Smart	Written by : Casey Alexander, Zeus Cervas, Steven Banks, and Dani Michaeli; Storyboarded by : Casey Alexander and Zeus Cervas (directors)	November 11, 2010	223–727	6.10
143	17	"The Great Patty Caper"	Tom Yasumi and Alan Smart	Written by : Casey Alexander, Zeus Cervas, Steven Banks, and Dani Michaeli; Storyboarded by : Casey Alexander and Zeus Cervas (directors)	November 11, 2010	223–728	6.10
Discovering that the Krusty Krab has run out of Krabby Patties, Mr. Krabs sends SpongeBob to get the ingredient from a storage vault that he accesses by train. However, the key goes missing, and SpongeBob must find out what happened to it.
144	18	"That Sinking Feeling"	Andrew Overtoom	Written by : Luke Brookshier, Nate Cash, and Mr. Lawrence; Storyboarded by : Luke Brookshier and Nate Cash (directors)	July 8, 2010	223–729	2.72
144	18	"Karate Star"	Tom Yasumi	Written by : Casey Alexander, Zeus Cervas, and Derek Iversen; Storyboarded by : Casey Alexander and Zeus Cervas (directors)	July 9, 2010	223–730	3.46
"That Sinking Feeling": When SpongeBob and Patrick keep running across Squidward's front yard, he forbids them from playing in it. As a result, SpongeBob and Patrick dig tunnels between their two houses, playing under Squidward's house, and accidentally sink it as a result. "Karate Star": After Patrick saves SpongeBob from choking, SpongeBob decides to reward him by giving him karate lessons. Patrick goes out of control with his karate chopping, destroying the town.
145	19	"Buried in Time"	Andrew Overtoom	Written by : Nate Cash, Sean Charmatz, and Mr. Lawrence; Storyboarded by : Nate Cash and Sean Charmatz (directors)	September 18, 2010	223–726	4.74
145	19	"Enchanted Tiki Dreams"	Alan Smart	Written by : Aaron Springer, Sean Charmatz, and Richard Pursel; Storyboarded by : Aaron Springer and Sean Charmatz (directors)	June 19, 2010	223–732	3.72
"Buried in Time": Mr. Krabs creates a time capsule from a tartar sauce container. SpongeBob, Patrick, and Squidward accidentally get locked in the time capsule, which gets buried underground and will not be seen again for 50 years. "Enchanted Tiki Dreams": Squidward is annoyed by SpongeBob and Patrick and wants to live in his own world where he can relax in peace. As a result, SpongeBob and Patrick promise to make up for him, so they build a tiki world for Squidward.
146	20	"The Abrasive Side"	Tom Yasumi	Written by : Luke Brookshier, Nate Cash, and Mr. Lawrence; Storyboarded by : Luke Brookshier and Nate Cash (directors)	November 27, 2010	223–734	4.54
146	20	"Earworm"	Alan Smart	Written by : Casey Alexander, Zeus Cervas, and Derek Iversen; Storyboarded by : Casey Alexander and Zeus Cervas (directors)	November 27, 2010	223–733	4.54
"The Abrasive Side": SpongeBob has trouble saying "no" to people and misses out going to Glove World with Patrick because everyone takes advantage of his day off, so Gary orders an "abrasive side" for him. However, the abrasive side causes him to start acting rude to his friends without knowing. "Earworm": SpongeBob gets an earworm with a song called "Musical Doodle," and starts acting crazy. Patrick, Mr. Krabs, Sandy, and Squidward tries to play other catchy tunes to save SpongeBob.
147	21	"Hide and Then What Happens?"	Andrew Overtoom	Written by : Aaron Springer and Dani Michaeli; Storyboarded by : Aaron Springer (director)	August 9, 2010	223–735	4.38
147	21	"Shellback Shenanigans"	Andrew Overtoom	Written by : Aaron Springer and Richard Pursel; Storyboarded by : Aaron Springer (director)	September 18, 2010	223–738	4.74
"Hide and Then What Happens?": During a game of hide-and-seek, SpongeBob travels across the world to find Patrick, not knowing he's where'd he least expect. "Shellback Shenanigans": Plankton gets Gary away on a vacation as part of another plan to steal the Krabby Patty formula. While Gary is away, Plankton disguises himself as Gary to trick SpongeBob in order to obtain the formula. Unfortunately, it causes SpongeBob to believe "Gary" is terminally ill, experiencing a trip to the hospital.
148	22	"The Masterpiece"	Tom Yasumi	Written by : Casey Alexander, Zeus Cervas, and Steven Banks; Storyboarded by : Casey Alexander and Zeus Cervas (directors)	October 2, 2010	223–736	3.99
148	22	"Whelk Attack"	Tom Yasumi	Written by : Luke Brookshier, Nate Cash, and Richard Pursel; Storyboarded by : Luke Brookshier and Nate Cash (directors)	October 2, 2010	223–739	3.99
"The Masterpiece": Squidward sculpts a giant statue of Mr. Krabs to attract customers to the Krusty Krab. "Whelk Attack": Giant sea whelks invade Bikini Bottom and terrorize the residents.
149	23	"You Don't Know Sponge"	Alan Smart	Written by : Luke Brookshier, Nate Cash, and Derek Iversen; Storyboarded by : Luke Brookshier and Nate Cash (directors)	August 9, 2010	223–737	4.38
149	23	"Tunnel of Glove"	Alan Smart	Written by : Casey Alexander, Zeus Cervas, and Dani Michaeli; Storyboarded by : Casey Alexander and Zeus Cervas (directors)	February 12, 2011	223–740	5.01
"You Don't Know Sponge": SpongeBob and Patrick take a quiz about each other to test their friendship. When Patrick gets all the answers wrong, SpongeBob tries to search for a new friend. "Tunnel of Glove": Pearl is forced to go on the "Tunnel of Glove" ride with SpongeBob, much to her dismay. While they are on the ride, it malfunctions, which only makes Pearl angrier. Patrick unintentionally makes their condition inside the ride worse while looking for SpongeBob.
150	24	"Krusty Dogs"	Tom Yasumi	Written by : Aaron Springer and Dani Michaeli; Storyboarded by : Aaron Springer (director)	October 9, 2010	223–748	4.58
150	24	"The Wreck of the Mauna Loa"	Andrew Overtoom	Written by : Casey Alexander, Zeus Cervas, and Derek Iversen; Storyboarded by : Casey Alexander and Zeus Cervas (directors)	October 9, 2010	223–747	4.58
"Krusty Dogs": SpongeBob invents the "Krusty Dog" out of leftover Krabby Patty ingredients. It becomes very successful, which makes Mr. Krabs to remove the Krabby Patties from the menu. SpongeBob becomes upset and tries to sabotage the Krusty Dogs and bring back the patties. "The Wreck of the Mauna Loa": SpongeBob and Patrick accidentally find the wreck of a lost ship called the Mauna Loa. They decide to make it their "secret hideout." However, Mr. Krabs overhears the two and discovers the ship. Realizing that the ship is actually an abandoned amusement park, Mr. Krabs turns the ship into an amusement ride to make profit, but he ends up being arrested due to the ride being considered dangerous.
151	25	"New Fish in Town"	Andrew Overtoom	Written by : Aaron Springer and Derek Iversen; Storyboarded by : Aaron Springer (director)	January 15, 2011	223–751	4.71
151	25	"Love That Squid"	Alan Smart	Written by : Casey Alexander, Zeus Cervas, Sean Charmatz, and Richard Pursel; Storyboarded by : Casey Alexander, Zeus Cervas, and Sean Charmatz (directors)	February 12, 2011	223–749	5.01
"New Fish in Town": A new fish named Howard moves into the neighborhood, and Squidward wants to befriend him. Howard hates "jelly-fishing bubble-blowers," so Squidward tries to keep SpongeBob and Patrick away from him at all costs. "Love That Squid": At the Krusty Krab, Squidward meets another octopus named Squilvia and falls in love with her. However, he is nervous to attend their first date, so he seeks SpongeBob to help him. SpongeBob suggests that Squidward go on a "practice date" with him, but Squidward gets annoyed by his antics.
152	26	"Big Sister Sam"	Tom Yasumi	Written by : Casey Alexander, Zeus Cervas, and Richard Pursel; Storyboarded by : Casey Alexander and Zeus Cervas (directors)	January 15, 2011	223–752	4.71
152	26	"Perfect Chemistry"	Alan Smart	Written by : Luke Brookshier, Nate Cash, and Mr. Lawrence; Storyboarded by : Luke Brookshier and Nate Cash (directors)	February 26, 2011	223–750	4.78
"Big Sister Sam": Patrick's older sister Sam comes to Bikini Bottom to visit Patrick. Squidward has a feud with Sam, and the two go back and forth fighting. Even SpongeBob finds himself in the middle of the conflict when he tries to get the Star siblings and Squidward to stop their fighting. "Perfect Chemistry": Plankton tries to use Sandy's new invention in an attempt to steal the Krabby Patty formula (without her knowing). However, SpongeBob becomes jealous when he believes there is a bond between their love of science.

== Reception ==
The series has received recognition, including the 2010 Kids' Choice Awards for Favorite Cartoon. The series also won the same category at the succeeding year's Kids' Choice Awards and at the 2010 and 2011 Indonesia Kids' Choice Awards. At the Kids' Choice Awards Mexico 2010 and Kids' Choice Awards Argentina 2011, the show was nominated for Favorite Cartoon, but did not win. The episode "That Sinking Feeling" was nominated at the 63rd Primetime Emmy Awards for Outstanding Short-format Animated Program. Furthermore, at the 38th Annie Awards, the show won for Best Animated Television Production for Children, while the crew members, Jeremy Wakefield, Sage Guyton, Nick Carr and Tuck Tucker, won the Music in a Television Production category. SpongeBob SquarePants also won at the 2011 ASCAP Film and Television Awards for Top Television Series. At the 2010 and 2011 TP de Oro, the series won the Best Children and Youth Program category.

The season received mixed to negative reviews, with certain episodes being panned by critics and audiences alike. In his review of the seventh season for DVD Talk, Ian Jane wrote that the series "is one of those rare animated shows that can be enjoyed equally as much by both adults and children." He described the concept of the show as "utterly ludicrous." He cited the episodes "SpongeBob's Last Stand" and "Tentacle-Vision" as "interesting stand outs," while the episodes "The Inside Job", "Back to the Past", "Gary in Love", and "The Abrasive Side" as "memorable episodes this time around." However, Jane said that the season is not as good as the previous seasons, writing "It's not that this more recent material isn't fun, because it is, but by this point in time storylines are beginning to get a little repetitive and as such, the series doesn't seem quite as fresh and original as it once did." Jane "recommended" the DVD set, writing "This latest collection of episodes is not a high point in the series but it's still decent enough family friendly entertainment, even if it does get too repetitive for its own good."

Josh Rode of DVD Verdict said that the season "has its moments", but is "by far the least consistently funny season of the venerable cartoon." Rode also said that the characters of SpongeBob SquarePants and Patrick Star "have become the least engaging parts of the show, which is a problem since they dominate screen time." He perceived that Patrick "has been dumbed down too far." As for the character of SpongeBob, he criticized his changing voice that has become "more nasal over the years." He described the character "like a happy, fun-loving, not-overly-intelligent sponge," but said that "[He] has entirely lost the naïveté which has long been the basis of his charm."

== DVD release ==
The DVD boxset for season seven was released by Paramount Home Entertainment in the United States and Canada in December 2011, six months after the season had completed broadcast on television. The DVD release features bonus materials, including "animated shorts."

SpongeBob SquarePants: Complete Seventh Season
Set details			Special features
26 episodes; 4-disc set; 1.33:1 aspect ratio; Languages: English (Dolby Digital 5.1)			Animated shorts for: "Back to the Past"; "SpongeBob's Last Stand"; "Legends of Bikini Bottom"; "The Great Patty Caper"
Release dates			Animated shorts for: "Back to the Past"; "SpongeBob's Last Stand"; "Legends of Bikini Bottom"; "The Great Patty Caper"
Region 1	Region 2	Region 4	Animated shorts for: "Back to the Past"; "SpongeBob's Last Stand"; "Legends of Bikini Bottom"; "The Great Patty Caper"
December 6, 2011	September 17, 2012	September 9, 2012	Animated shorts for: "Back to the Past"; "SpongeBob's Last Stand"; "Legends of Bikini Bottom"; "The Great Patty Caper"
