= The Great Patty Caper =

- SpongeBob SquarePants episode
- Promotional artwork for the episode depicting SpongeBob and Patrick pursuing Plankton for the key to the safe deposit box where the Krabby Patty formula is kept.
- Episode no.: Season 7 Episode 17
- Directed by: Alan Smart (animation and supervising); Tom Yasumi (animation); Casey Alexander (storyboard); Zeus Cervas (storyboard)
- Written by: Casey Alexander; Zeus Cervas; Steven Banks; Dani Michaeli
- Production code: 223-727/223-728
- Original air date: November 11, 2010
- Running time: 22 minutes (without commercials)

Episode chronology
← Previous "Legends of Bikini Bottom: Sponge-Cano!"	Next → "That Sinking Feeling"
- SpongeBob SquarePants (season 7)

"The Great Patty Caper", also known as "Mystery with a Twistery" and "Krabby Patty No More", is the 17th episode of the seventh season and the 143rd overall episode of the American animated television series SpongeBob SquarePants. The episode originally aired on Nickelodeon in the United States on November 11, 2010. The series follows the adventures of the title character in the underwater city of Bikini Bottom. In the episode, the key to the vault holding the Krabby Patty recipe gets lost and SpongeBob must locate it before the recipe is lost forever.

The episode was a television special written by Casey Alexander, Zeus Cervas, Steven Banks and Dani Michaeli, and the animation was directed by supervising director, Alan Smart and Tom Yasumi. "The Great Patty Caper" became available on the DVD of the same name on March 8, 2011. Upon release, the episode drew 6.6 million viewers, making it the top animated telecast of 2010, and was met with positive reviews.

== Plot summary ==
At the Krusty Krab, SpongeBob goes into the freezer to get Krabby Patties, only to discover that none are left. He and Mr. Krabs try to make more, but Plankton comes out of the vault with the formula. Mr. Krabs catches him and sends the formula to a bank, before realizing that he needs it back to make more Krabby Patties. He gives SpongeBob the key to the vault in which the recipe is hidden, and he and Patrick board a train to the bank for the safe deposit box. Eventually, the key is stolen and SpongeBob and Patrick must find the culprit. Just then, Plankton walks up and Patrick searches him but finds him clean. The duo stops the train and uncover multiple thieves, none of which hold the key.

SpongeBob begins crying when Patrick reveals that he has found the key, which was in SpongeBob's pants. They board the train again, and Plankton steals the key and throws them out of a window. They fly back onto the train to pursue him, but Plankton disconnects the coaches and tender of the train, leaving SpongeBob and Patrick in the engine. Patrick tries to stop it, but destroys the brakes and causes the engine to go faster. Patrick stops the engine by throwing a boulder on the track, causing it to flip over and nearly collide with a retirement home. Next, Patrick accidentally breaks the throttle. Meanwhile, Plankton is seen trying to steal the formula but is stopped by Mr. Krabs. The engine crashes into the bank, and Mr. Krabs has to pay for the damages.

== Production ==
"The Great Patty Caper" was written by Casey Alexander, Zeus Cervas, Steven Banks and Dani Michaeli, with supervising director, Alan Smart and Tom Yasumi serving as animation directors. Alexander and Cervas also functioned as storyboard directors. The episode originally aired on Nickelodeon in the United States on November 11, 2010, with a TV-Y7 parental rating.

The episode was branded by Nickelodeon as a television special called "Mystery with a Twistery" in which:

"Mr. Krabs sends the Krabby Patty recipe to a far away vault for safe keeping so that Plankton can’t get to it. But when Mr. Krabs forgets the recipe himself he gives SpongeBob the key to the vault and sends him on a journey across the ocean to retrieve it. Things go bad when the key goes missing aboard the Oceanic Express train and SpongeBob must identify the culprit and get the key back before the Krabby Patty recipe is missing forever!"

"The Great Patty Caper" was released on a DVD compilation of the same name on March 8, 2011, by Paramount Home Entertainment. The DVD includes the episode itself, "Growth Spout", "Stuck in the Wringer", "Someone's in the Kitchen With Sandy", "The Inside Job", "Greasy Buffoons", and the "Model Sponge". On December 6, 2011, "The Great Patty Caper" was released on the SpongeBob SquarePants: Complete Seventh Season DVD, alongside all episodes of the seventh season. On June 4, 2019, "The Great Patty Caper" was released on the SpongeBob SquarePants: The Next 100 Episodes DVD, alongside all the episodes of seasons six through nine.

== Reception ==
Upon release, "The Great Patty Caper" ranked as basic cable's top entertainment telecast for its release week with total viewers, drawing 6.1 million viewers. The episode also ranked as the week's number-one telecast with kids 2–11 on broadcast and basic cable. The premiere ranked as the top program for Thursday, November 11, night with all children and tween demographics, posting double- and triple-digit gains for Nickelodeon. The special also averaged 1.4/1.6 million in the adults demographics ranging from 18 to 49, drawing more adult viewers than TBS' Conan for the night. The episode had a total of 6.6 million viewers (+122%), making it as the year's top animated telecast with kids 2–11.

The episode received mostly positive reviews. Nancy Basile of About.com gave the episode a 3.5 out of 5 rating, saying "'Plankton Chugs Along' would have been better at regular episode length rather than stretching it to a special. With some of the slower, duller parts edited out, the whole episode would come off as clever, slick and fast-paced funny." Sandy Angulo Chen of Common Sense Media gave the episode 3/5 stars and wrote "There's still no hidden educational purpose to the series, but it does expose kids to plot structure, character development, predictability, and the various ways that humor is used in a story."

Paul Mavis of DVD Talk positively reacted to the episode and said the episode "is certainly one of the more energetic entries I've seen from the series in some time." Mavis added "'Plankton Chugs Along' picks up a good head of steam to a satisfying conclusion (SpongeBob as an old geezer is also foolproof)," but was disappointed "that someone didn't exploit the obvious Agatha Christie Murder on the Orient Express-flavored train sequence by having SpongeBob adorned as Poirot or even Miss Marple as he went about his inept sleuthing (SpongeBob in drag is always a solid winner)."

Marty Shaw of BSC Kids, on the ratings, said "SpongeBob SquarePants has been on the air since 1999 and the November 11th episode was the eight show of the eight season. What exactly does that mean? With 6.102 million viewers watching, it means that the adventures of SpongeBob SquarePants never get old." Billy Gil of the Home Media Magazine said "'Plankton Chugs Along' is one of the better SpongeBob episodes in recent memory[...]"
