= Carla Jimenez =

American actress

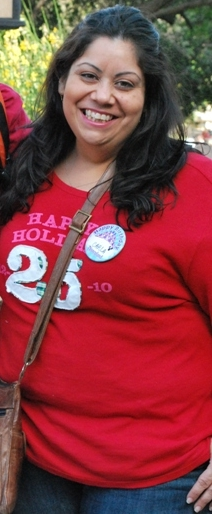
- Occupation: Actress
- Years active: 2002–present

Carla Jimenez is an American television and film actress.

== Career ==
She has had roles in series such as Lincoln Heights, My Name Is Earl and Little Britain USA, and has appeared in films including Miss March (2009) and Phat Girlz (2006).

Jimenez has appeared in Nacho Libre, Lady in the Water, and Accepted. In 2003, Jimenez appeared as a character named Virginia, in the independent cult film My Life with Morrissey by Andrew Overtoom. She was a recurring character on the ABC TV shows Desperate Housewives, Better Off Ted and Last Man Standing. She also played the recurring role of Rosa on Raising Hope.

Jimenez has also appeared in the Netflix sitcom Fuller House, playing an adoption agent for Jesse and Becky. She played Alba, the Pembertons' maid, on FOX's The Mick.

== Personal life ==
Jimenez is of Mexican heritage.

== Filmography ==
=== Film ===
Year	Title	Role	Notes
2003	My Life with Morrissey	Virginia	Direct-to-video
2003	Titillating Steven	Maryanne	
2006	Phat Girlz	Plus Size Shopper #3	
2006	Nacho Libre	Candidia	
2006	Lady in the Water	Perez de la Torre Sister #2	
2006	Accepted	Shoe Store Manager	
2006	The Dead Girl	Ashley's Caretaker	
2009	Miss March	Nurse Juanita	
2012	Act of Valor	Screaming Mom	
2012	White Frog	Mrs. Rodriguez	
2014	Murder of a Cat	Rosalita	
2014	Squatters	Georgia	
2014	The Purge: Anarchy	Deranged Woman	
2016	Pup Star	Ida	
2017	Puss in Book: Trapped in an Epic Tale	Señora Zapata	Voice; short
2019	Spies in Disguise	Geraldine	
2020	Friendsgiving	Nurse Julie	
2022	Steppin' Into The Holiday	Marissa	HBO Max release
2024	Micro Budget	Jasmine	
2024	Carved	Barb	Hulu release

=== Television ===
Year	Title	Role	Notes
2002, 2003	Strong Medicine	Annie / Becky	2 episodes
2003	Russians in the City of Angels	Lucinda	Episode: "Srok"
2003	ER	Eloise	2 episodes
2003	The District	Louise	Episode: "Acceptable Losses"
2005	Malcolm in the Middle	Attendant	Episode: "No Motorcycles"
2005	Wanted	Woman with Dog	Episode: "Rubbing One Out"
2005	Half & Half	Jackie	Episode: "The Big State of the Reunion Episode"
2006	The Shield	Calida	Episode: "Extraction"
2006	Pepper Dennis	Audience Member #4	Episode: "Saving Venice"
2006	My Name Is Earl	Penelope	Episode: "Jump for Joy"
2006	CSI: Crime Scene Investigation	Juror #1	Episode: "Post Mortem"
2006, 2008	Everybody Hates Chris	Nurse	2 episodes
2007	Days of Our Lives	Nurse	Episode #1.10544
2007	In Case of Emergency	Concession Cashier	Episode: "Disorder in the Court"
2007	Nick Cannon Presents: Short Circuitz	Latina Woman	Episode #1.4
2007	Entourage	Nurse	Episode: "The Dream Team"
2007	Shark	Jury Foreperson	Episode: "Gangster Movies"
2008	Black Widow	Rosa	Television film
2008	Night Life	Nanny	Television film
2008	Little Britain USA	Helen Fisher	2 episodes
2008	Dexter	Nurse	Episode: "Turning Biminese"
2008	Lincoln Heights	Maria Rodriguez	3 episodes
2008	Ernesto	Lupita	Television film
2009	Eleventh Hour	Latina Nurse	Episode: "Pinocchio"
2009	The Closer	Crowd Member #6	Episode: "Half Load"
2009	Hannah Montana	Opera Singer	Episode: "Judge Me Tender"
2009–2010	Better Off Ted	Patricia / Lab Worker #2	4 episodes
2010	Justified	Mrs. Pena	Episode: "Long in the Tooth"
2010	Hawthorne	Woman	Episode: "The Match"
2010	Sons of Anarchy	Clinic Admin	Episode: "Lochan Mor"
2010	Desperate Housewives	Carmen Sanchez	4 episodes
2011	Bones	Lucy Rodriguez	Episode: "The Bikini in the Soup"
2011	Harry's Law	Xenia Torres	2 episodes
2011–2014	Raising Hope	Rosa	12 episodes
2012	GCB	Lupe	Episode: "Hell Hath No Fury"
2013	Archer	Mercedes Moreno	Episode: "Coyote Lovely"
2013	The Secret Life of the American Teenager	Kathy's Family's Maid	Episode: "It's a Mirace"
2013	Community	Cashier	Episode: "Heroic Origins"
2013	Anger Management	Kim	Episode: "Charlie and Kate's Dirty Pictures"
2013	Super Clyde	Adriana	Television film
2013	Sean Saves the World	Consuela	Episode: "Shut Your Parent Trap"
2013–2015	Last Man Standing	Blanca	8 episodes
2014	Growing Up Fisher	Janice	5 episodes
2014	Devious Maids	Esperanza	Episode: "Proof"
2014	Bad Teacher	Lupe	Episode: "Life Science"
2014	Jennifer Falls	Lupe	Episode: "School Trouble"
2015	2 Broke Girls	Raquel	Episode: "And the Gym and Juice"
2015	The King of 7B	Juana	Television film
2015–2018	The Adventures of Puss in Boots	Señora Zapata	31 episodes; voice
2016	Young & Hungry	Martina	Episode: "Young & Therapy"
2016	The Mindy Project	Rosa	Episode: "Under the Texan Sun"
2016	Fuller House	Mrs. Lopez	Episode: "Glazed and Confused"
2016	Internity	Tracey Wiggins	Episode: "Pilot"
2017	Santa Clarita Diet	Esther	Episode: "How Much Vomit?"
2017	Gay of Thrones	Carla Jimenez	Episode: "The Kween's Juicefast"
2017–2018	The Mick	Alba	Main Cast
2018–2020	Single Parents	Lil	3 episodes
2019	Life in Pieces	Sherri	2 episodes
2020	A Million Little Things	Elena	Episode: "Daisy"
2022	Better Things	Carla	Episode: "F*ck Anatoly's Mom
2022	Holiday Harmony	Zachael	Television film (Lifetime)
2023	The Good Doctor	Daphne Garcia	Episode: “The Blip”
2023	Freeridge		Episode: "Karmic Coincidence"
2024	Grotesquerie	Jill	Episode: "In Dreams"
