= Legends of Bikini Bottom =

Anthology series in the animated series SpongeBob SquarePants

- Promotional artwork for the series depicting SpongeBob (bottom right) and Patrick (bottom left) in a cave with Madame Hagfish (upper left), Ma Angler (center), and the teenage mermaid (upper right) by the wall.
- Also known as: SpongeBob and the Legends of Bikini Bottom
- Starring: Tom Kenny; Bill Fagerbakke; Rodger Bumpass; Clancy Brown; Mr. Lawrence; Jill Talley; Lori Alan
- Country of origin: United States
- Original language: English
- No. of seasons: 1
- No. of episodes: 6

Original release
- Network: Nickelodeon
- Release: January 28 – June 11, 2011

Legends of Bikini Bottom is an anthology series of six episodes in the American animated television series SpongeBob SquarePants, as part of its seventh season. As the name suggests, the episodes have plots involving things like monsters, magic, and mythical creatures. The episode called "Trenchbillies" first premiered on the online social networking service Facebook on January 27, 2011, before airing on Nickelodeon on January 29, 2011. The four others, titled "Sponge-Cano!", "The Main Drain", "The Monster Who Came to Bikini Bottom" and "Welcome to the Bikini Bottom Triangle" premiered on Nickelodeon as part of an hour-long special on January 28, 2011. The decision to air the series online was aimed at attracting "the young and the restless hooked to the internet and the social media."

In addition to the regular series cast, Amy Sedaris, Ginnifer Goodwin and Kristen Wiig were guest stars. Tie-in promotions were made with Burger King, which released a toy line based on the series. Legends of Bikini Bottom became available on a DVD of the same name on November 16, 2010, alongside the episode called "The Curse of the Hex". The series received positive reviews from media critics upon release. On Paramount+, all six episodes are grouped together into a single episode.

The concept of the episode "Sponge-Cano!" was recycled into a musical based on the series that premiered in 2017 to universal acclaim.

== Episodes ==
No. overall	No. in season	Title	Directed by	Written by	Original release date
1	14a (140a)	"The Monster Who Came to Bikini Bottom"	Andrew Overtoom (Animation); Aaron Springer (Storyboard); Alan Smart (Supervising)	Aaron Springer and Dani Michaeli	January 28, 2011
Patrick accidentally creates a monster after contaminating a coral group with radioactive waste. While Patrick befriends "Rarrg", the other citizens of Bikini Bottom try to drive it away.
2	14b (140b)	"Welcome to the Bikini Bottom Triangle"	Alan Smart (Animation/Supervising); Luke Brookshier & Nate Cash (Storyboard)	Luke Brookshier, Nate Cash and Dani Michaeli	January 28, 2011
SpongeBob discovers that Mr. Krabs, along with a few other things, has gone missing. While SpongeBob and Squidward investigate, they get accidentally sucked into an alternate realm called the "Bikini Bottom Triangle." There, they discover a quintet of mermaids, who steal various items and stockpile them in the island.
3	15a (141a)	"The Curse of the Hex"	Tom Yasumi (Animation); Aaron Springer (Storyboard); Alan Smart (Supervising)	Aaron Springer and Richard Pursel	June 11, 2011
After being forbidden to order at the Krusty Krab at closing time, an evil hagfish known as Madame Hagfish curses the restaurant. The next day, unnatural events occur at the restaurant, which concerns Mr. Krabs. He and SpongeBob set out to find the hagfish in hope that she will lift the curse.
4	15b (141b)	"The Main Drain"	Alan Smart (Animation/Supervising); Luke Brookshier & Nate Cash (Storyboard)	Luke Brookshier, Nate Cash and Mr. Lawrence	January 28, 2011
Mr. Krabs warns SpongeBob and Patrick about a "Main Drain," a drain at the bottom of the ocean that once destroyed Bikini Bottom. Curious, SpongeBob and Patrick set out to find the drain.
5	16a (142a)	"Trenchbillies"	Andrew Overtoom (Animation); Aaron Springer (Storyboard); Alan Smart (Supervising)	Aaron Springer and Richard Pursel	January 27, 2011 (Facebook); January 29, 2011 (Nickelodeon)
After falling off a cliff, SpongeBob and Patrick are held prisoners by a backward gang of trench-dwelling hillbillies called "trenchbillies," led by their matriarch Ma Angler. The two are sentenced to a series of challenges, which they must complete in order to be set free.
6	16b (142b)	"Sponge-Cano!"	Tom Yasumi (Animation); Casey Alexander & Zeus Cervas (Storyboard); Alan Smart (Supervising)	Casey Alexander, Zeus Cervas and Derek Iversen	January 28, 2011
Squidward, who dubs himself as "the most miserable person in Bikini Bottom", complains about everything around him, when a more serious problem arises in the form of a volcanic eruption. A mysterious dolphin warrior predicts that they must sacrifice "the most miserable person" to stop the volcano, and Squidward tries to take back his statement.

== Production ==
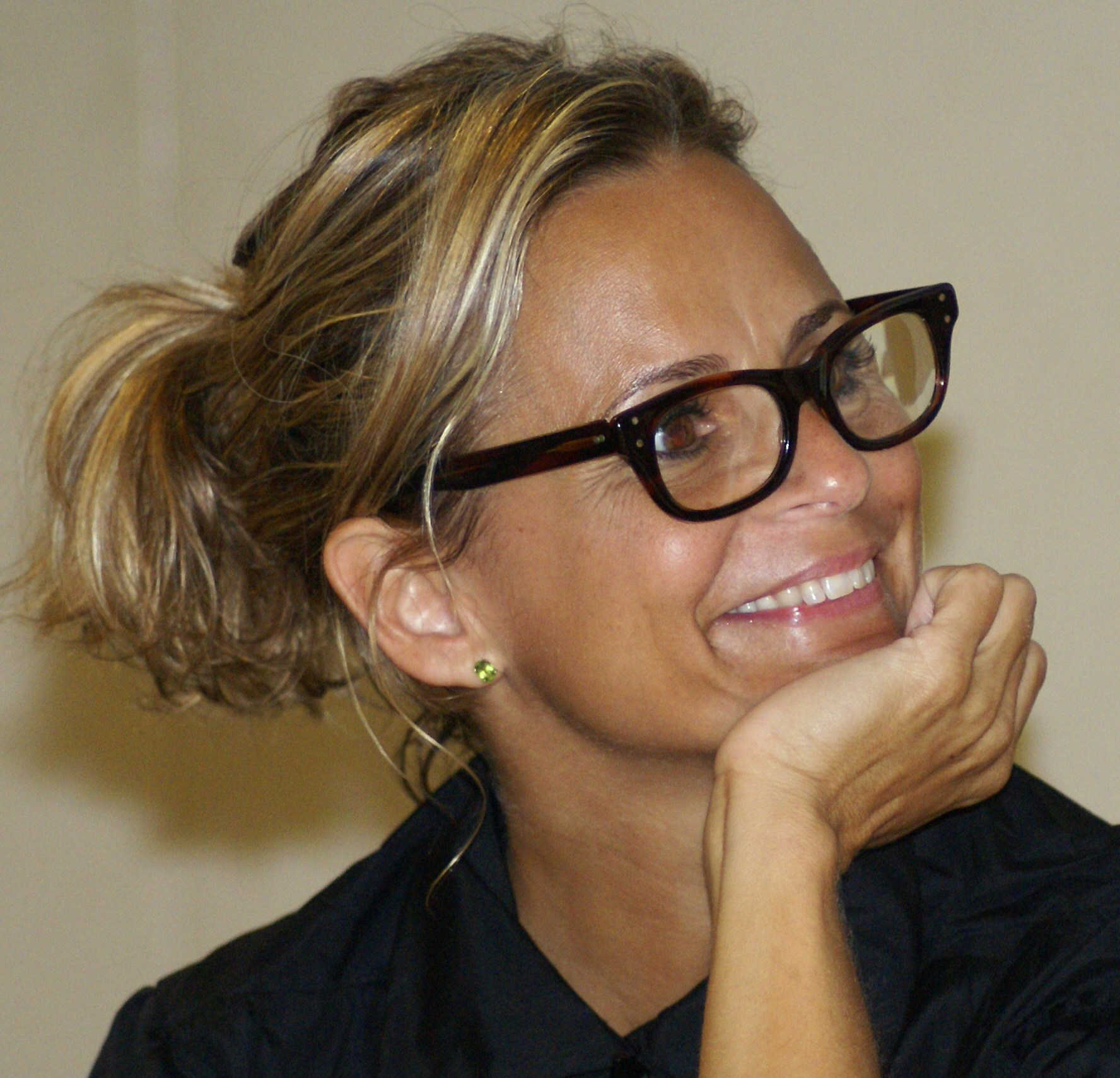
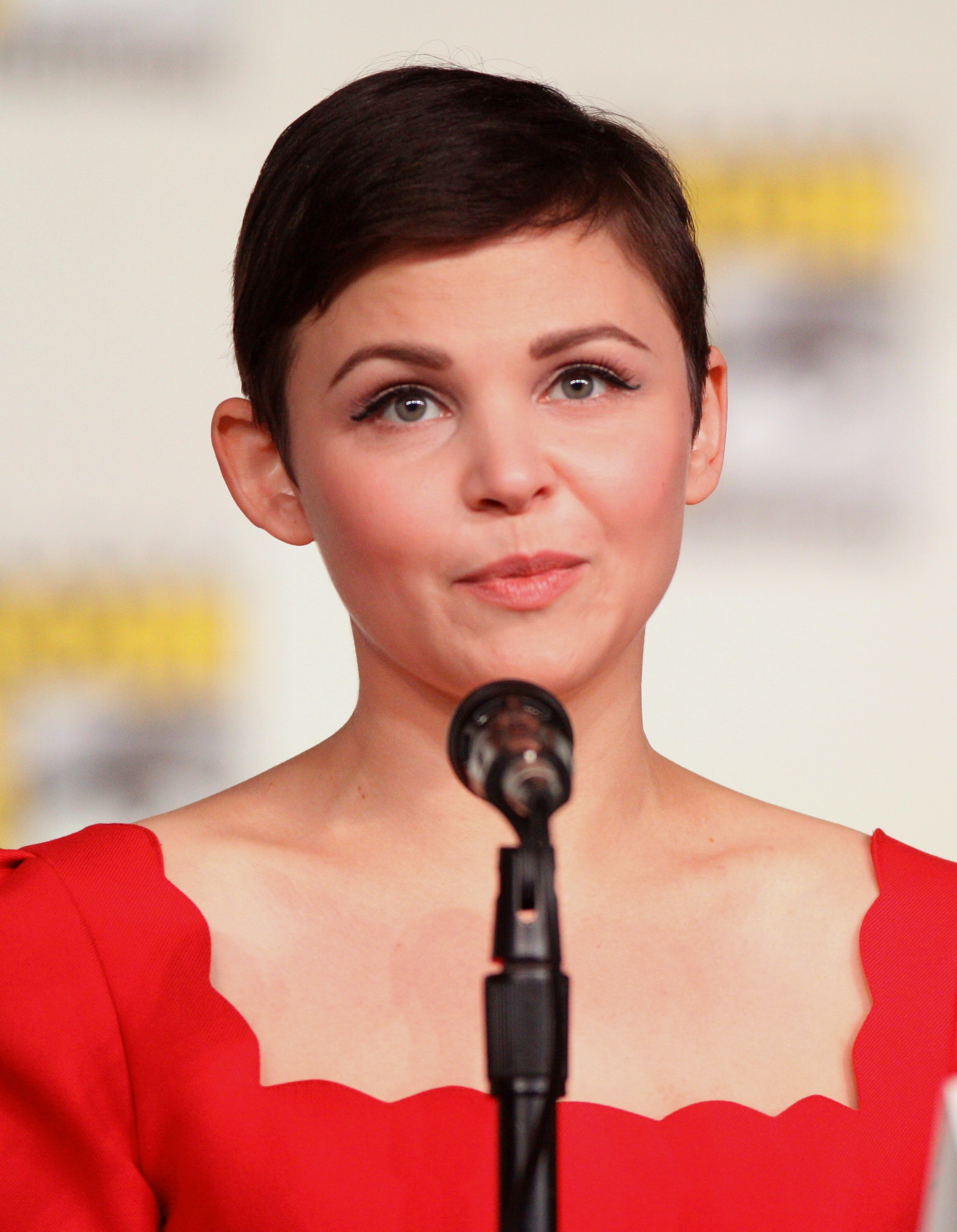
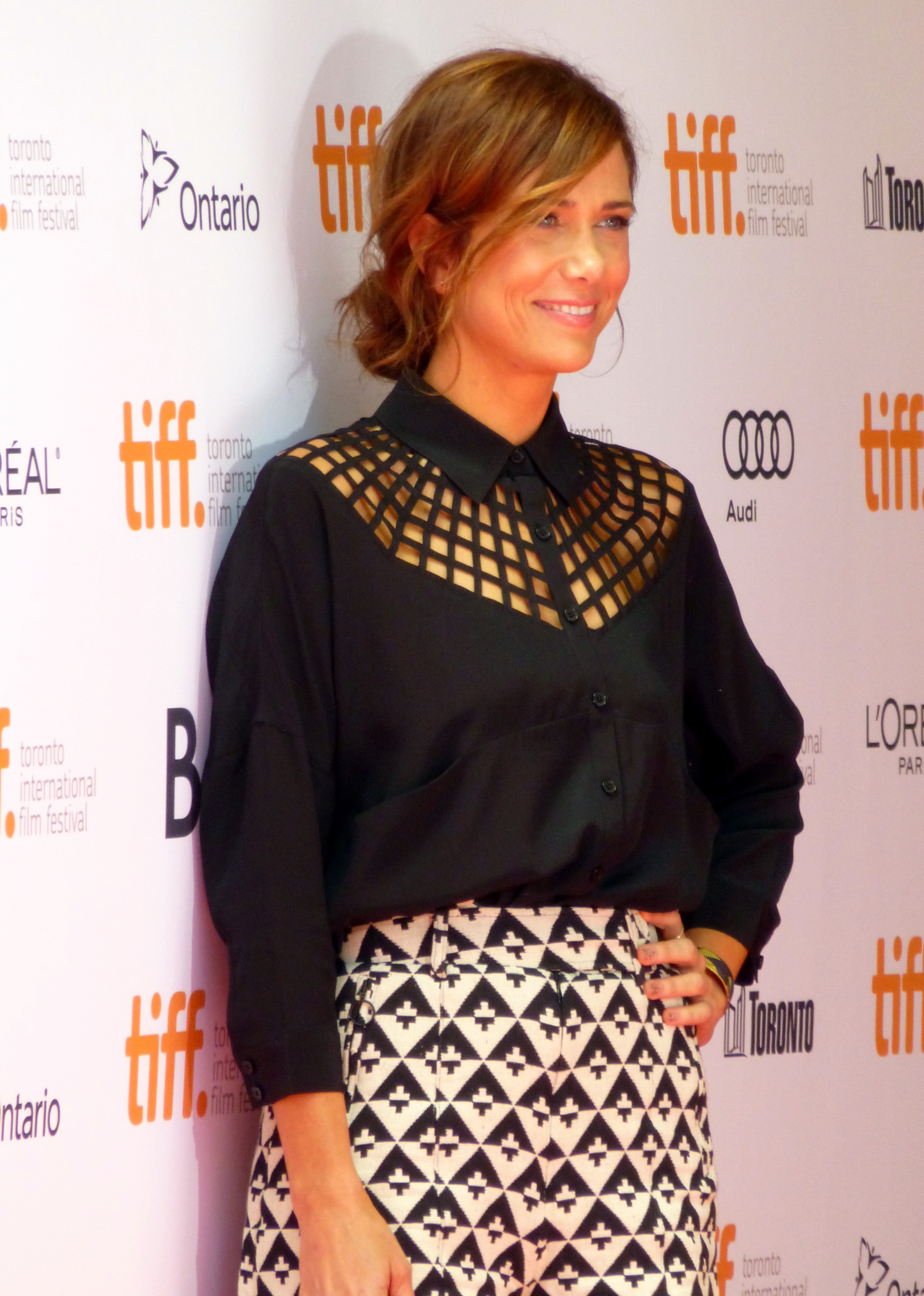
Amy Sedaris (left), Ginnifer Goodwin (middle) and Kristen Wiig (right) guest starred in the series.

Legends of Bikini Bottom is an anthology series of six episodes in SpongeBob SquarePants. The series was released on January 27, 2011, on the online social networking service Facebook before it aired on the cable channel Nickelodeon. "Trenchbillies" was the first episode to air on Facebook and was written by Aaron Springer and Richard Pursel, with Andrew Overtoom serving as animation director. Nickelodeon said on Wednesday, January 27, that SpongeBob SquarePants has more than 16 million "friends" on Facebook. The decision of airing the series online was aimed at attracting "the young and the restless hooked to the internet and the social media." In a press release, Brown Johnson, president of animation for Nickelodeon and MTVN Kids and Family Group, said "The anthology format of Legends of Bikini Bottom provides a great opportunity to try something new where we can give SpongeBob's 16 million fans on Facebook a first look, in addition to new content on-air[...]" Each episode was available for two weeks on Facebook.

The other four episodes called "Sponge-Cano!", "The Main Drain", "The Monster Who Came to Bikini Bottom" and "Welcome to the Bikini Bottom Triangle" premiered on Nickelodeon in an hour-long special on January 28, 2011. The hour-long premiere of Legends of Bikini Bottom was simulcast on Nick Mobile, and post premiere, it was available via Nickelodeon's download-to-own partners. On Nick.com, a dedicated page will featured clips from the special, SpongeBob trivia, games and a Patchy the Pirate-themed message board. Additionally, Nick.com launched a new "Game of the Week" called "Legends of Bikini Bottom" which is composed of six minigames that require players to maneuver SpongeBob or other characters through a different legend-themed adventure. The first game was launched on Thursday, January 20, and the remaining five was launched one each day from Monday, January 24, through Friday, January 28. To gain access to the final game, players must enter the code available only on-air during the hour-long special aired on January 28.

In addition to the regular cast, American actress Amy Sedaris and Ginnifer Goodwin guest starred. Sedaris guest starred in the episode "Trenchbillies" as the voice of Ma Angler. Goodwin also guest starred as the voice of a purple-haired mermaid in the episode "Welcome to the Bikini Bottom Triangle". She lends her voice to a teenage mermaid who steals from others through Bikini Bottom's version of the Bermuda Triangle. Brown Johnson said "[...]Ginnifer Goodwin and Amy Sedaris have done a fantastic job voicing their characters, which enriches the entire collection of stories."

Legends of Bikini Bottom was released on DVD of the same name before on November 16, 2010, by the Paramount Home Entertainment. The DVD features the six episodes adding the episode called "The Curse of the Hex". The episode was a part of the series but instead released on DVD. It guest starred Saturday Night Live's Kristen Wiig as the voice of Madame Hagfish. On December 6, 2011, the series was released on the SpongeBob SquarePants: Complete Seventh Season DVD, alongside all episodes of the seventh season. On June 4, 2019, the series was released on the SpongeBob SquarePants: The Next 100 Episodes DVD, alongside all the episodes of seasons six through nine.

== Marketing ==
Nickelodeon tied-in with Burger King to release a line of toys based on the series. The marketing campaign began on January 23, 2011. The toy line consisted of six different figures modeled after SpongeBob, Patrick and Mr. Krabs. While one of six toys was included free with every Burger King kids meal, extra toys were made available for purchase separately.

== Reception ==
"I was wary of watching SpongeBob SquarePants: Legends of Bikini Bottom because the cartoon hasn't been true to its original spirit in the last few seasons. Episodes have been missing that special ingredient, if you will, that they had in early seasons. Recent specials, such as "Mystery with a Twistery" and "Clash of the Tritons" were too slick, over-reaching, and had only moments of the old brilliance. However, the episodes on Legends of Bikini Bottom are hilarious and destined to become favorites."

— Nancy Basile in her review for About.com

Legends of Bikini Bottom received positive reviews from media critics. Nancy Basile of About.com positively reacted to the series and gave it a 4 out of 5 rating. She cited her favorite episodes like "Welcome to the Bikini Bottom Triangle" and "The Main Drain". She said "Firstly, you know an episode will be funny when it's titled 'Bikini Bottom Triangle'. My children had no idea why I was laughing at the title frame." her favorite scenes from the episode were "Gary's booty, watching the old sea dog spit his story and figuring out why Patrick wears cuff links." In another episode called "The Main Drain", she said "I won't ruin the set up because it's just so funny, but my favorite line is, 'It's now or never.' You have to see it to know why."

In his review for the DVD Talk, Paul Mavis said "SpongeBob SquarePants: Legends of Bikini Bottom is all-new, and therein lies what has becoming [sic] increasingly routine: haphazard quality. Some are mildly amusing, and others blow their promising set-ups." He added "Still, 'The Main Drain' and 'Trenchbillies' are fairly funny, while the magical warrior dolphin in 'Sponge-Cano!' may be worth the price of admission alone here."

Danielle Sullivan of Babble.com said "My 13-year-old still loves SpongeBob and his quirky underwater friends, and I have to admit that the show makes me laugh a lot. It's one of those unique blends that appeals to kids and parents." Michelle Lincaster of AllVoices, on the airing of the series on Facebook, said "SpongeBob SquarePants has a 16,000,000 fan following on Facebook so the premiere of The Legends of Bikini Bottom on Facebook shouldn't come as a surprise."

Jeff Robbins of the DVD Verdict was mixed on the series and said "SpongeBob SquarePants: Legends of Bikini Bottom, get Lost." Citing "The Monster Who Came to Bikini Bottom", he said "What is also notable here is the episode's ending, which features a brilliant call-back to an earlier seen flashback (more shades of Lost) that ties up the threads of the episode as well as any Larry David penned half-hour. This first short is SpongeBob at its best." Robbins called "The Main Drain" as "Not a good episode." and "Sponge-Cano!" as "A strong segment." In reviewing "The Curse of the Hex", Robbins said "Unfortunately, this lousy episode ends the disc on a sour note as a hagfish curses The Krusty Krab. The only notable aspect to this dull segment is that the hagfish is voiced by Saturday Night Live's Kristen Wiig, which, depending on your current view of the comedy institution, may make the episode more or less interesting. Either the writers got tired of attempting allusions to Lost by this point, or I simply got tired of looking for them."
