= SpongeBob's Last Stand =

- SpongeBob SquarePants episode
- Promotional artwork for the episode depicting SpongeBob protesting to save Jellyfish Fields.
- Episode no.: Season 7 Episode 8
- Directed by: Andrew Overtoom (animation): Tom Yasumi (animation); Aaron Springer (storyboard); Alan Smart (supervising)
- Written by: Aaron Springer; Steven Banks; Derek Iversen
- Production code: 223-714/223-715
- Original release date: March 16, 2010 (DVD) April 22, 2010 (television)
- Running time: 22 minutes (without commercials)

Episode chronology
← Previous "Squidward in Clarinetland"	Next → "Back to the Past"
- SpongeBob SquarePants (season 7)

"SpongeBob's Last Stand" is the eighth episode of the seventh season and the 134th overall episode of the American animated television series SpongeBob SquarePants. The episode was originally released on DVD on March 16, 2010, and aired on Nickelodeon in the United States on April 22, 2010, in celebration of Earth Day.

The series follows the adventures and endeavors of the title character and his various friends in the underwater city of Bikini Bottom. In this episode, SpongeBob and Patrick protest the construction of a highway that would destroy Jellyfish Fields and threaten the Krusty Krab's business.

The episode was written by Aaron Springer, Steven Banks, and Derek Iversen, and the animation was directed by Andrew Overtoom and Tom Yasumi. On release, the episode was met with positive reviews.

== Plot ==
Early one day, SpongeBob and Patrick become the first visitors to a new section of Jellyfish Fields. As they wander in the area, they discover a sign that states that Shelly Superhighway will be built through Jellyfish Fields. Believing that the highway will pollute and ultimately destroy Jellyfish Fields, SpongeBob resolves to prevent the highway's creation.

SpongeBob asks Mr. Krabs for assistance, but he supports the highway, believing it can bring more customers to the Krusty Krab. SpongeBob then shows Mr. Krabs the highway's blueprint, demonstrating that the highway will run over the Krusty Krab and end directly at the Chum Bucket, revealing that Plankton is responsible for the highway's development. Mr. Krabs decides to support SpongeBob, and they both go to the Chum Bucket and try to stop Plankton from developing the highway; but the latter states that the rest of the town has unanimously voted to build it. Refusing to give up, SpongeBob and Patrick peacefully petition to stop the highway. Nobody listens to them or supports them, and they are quickly exiled for their actions. The highway is rapidly built and turns Jellyfish Fields into a wasteland, filling Bikini Bottom with pollution.

A few days later, the Krusty Krab's business quickly dwindles due to the highway. Believing that no one will come to the Krusty Krab, Mr. Krabs decides to sell Plankton the Krabby Patty formula, causing SpongeBob to lose hope. However, mere seconds before the sale, the angry jellyfish from Jellyfish Fields invade Bikini Bottom and start destroying the city. Seeing this as an opportunity to demolish the highway, SpongeBob makes an appeal to the people, who agree to destroy it. Everybody in Bikini Bottom turns against Plankton and helps destroy the highway, with Plankton getting run over as he tries to save it. The characters celebrate as Jellyfish Fields is restored to its natural state.

== Production ==
"SpongeBob's Last Stand" was written by Aaron Springer, Steven Banks, and Derek Iversen. Springer also served as storyboard director. Animation direction was by Andrew Overtoom and Tom Yasumi. The episode was part of Nickelodeon's 2010 Earth Day celebration. The episode originally aired on Nickelodeon in the United States on April 22, 2010, following a two-hour marathon of nature-themed SpongeBob episodes. A tie-in game to the episode was released online prior to its television airing. According to Nickelodeon, "[kids will] learn about the environment through different levels at different Bikini Bottom locales."

Nickelodeon officially announced the episode in a press release on April 5, 2010. According to the network, "SpongeBob and Patrick learn the 'Shelly Super Highway' is coming to Bikini Bottom – right through Jellyfish Fields! They must find a way to galvanize their neighbors, or it could be the end for Jellyfish Fields forever." It was promoted as SpongeBob's campaign to save the jellyfish. Writer Banks told that the episode never set out to teach environmental lessons. He said "When you entertain someone and make it funny, sometimes you can get a message across [...] Not that we're out here to send messages everywhere." The episode featured two musical numbers, including "Give Jellyfish Fields a Chance", a salute to the 1960s protest songs with similarities to John Lennon's "Give Peace a Chance". Banks, on the song, said that "[It is a] sort of Bob Dylan meets John Lennon."

On March 16, 2010, prior to the episode's television airing, the episode was released on the DVD compilation of the same name in the United States and Canada, on July 18, 2011, in region 2, and on June 6, 2011, in region 4. The DVD features six other episodes including "Pet or Pests", "Komputer Overload", "Gullible Pants", "Overbooked", "No Hat for Pat", and "Toy Store of Doom". On December 6, 2011, "SpongeBob's Last Stand" was released on the SpongeBob SquarePants: Complete Seventh Season DVD, alongside all episodes of the seventh season. On June 4, 2019, "SpongeBob's Last Stand" was released on the SpongeBob SquarePants: The Next 100 Episodes DVD, alongside all the episodes of seasons six through nine.

== Reception ==
According to Nielsen Media Research, Nickelodeon averaged 2.1 million total viewers. SpongeBob SquarePants was ranked as the number-one program on broadcast and basic cable in April and scored the number-one telecast, "SpongeBob's Last Stand", with kids 2–11 for the month.

The episode received positive reviews from critics. Paul Mavis of DVD Talk said "[the episode has] a nicely worked-out story and strong, integrated gags." He added "it's a particularly well-crafted entry." C. S. Strowbridge of The Numbers said "There are a number of funny gags on this double-length short, but it feels padded. It's also heavy-handed. I do like that they have a message to go with the jokes, but it would have been more effective if it were more subtle." Josh Rode of DVD Verdict described the episode as "decent". Shannon Gosney of The Mommy-Files said "there were many parts where my boys just burst out laughing. Even I found myself laughing at times."

Sean McElwee of Salon.com argued the episode was a critique of corporatocracy, voter apathy and police suppression of dissent, comparing SpongeBob's opposition to the former with the values of Naomi Klein. The episode drew some criticism from American conservatives, who argued that Nickelodeon was promoting environmentalism through this episode.
