= Last stand (disambiguation) =

Last stand is a position against overwhelming odds.

Last Stand or The Last Stand may also stand for:

== Film and TV ==
=== Film ===
- The Last Stand (1938 film), an American film directed by Joseph H. Lewis
- The Last Stand (1984 film), a film about the band Cold Chisel
- Last Stand, a 2000 science fiction action film with Orestes Matacena
- The Last Stand (2013 film), an action film about an American sheriff who fights against the Mexican drug mafia, starring Arnold Schwarzenegger
- X-Men: The Last Stand, a 2006 film

=== Television ===
- "Last Stand" (Stargate SG-1), an episode of the television series Stargate SG-1
- "Last Stand", an episode of the action-adventure television series MacGyver
- "SpongeBob's Last Stand", an episode of the American animated television series SpongeBob SquarePants
- "The Last Stand", the fifty-second and final episode of The Legend of Korra
- "The Last Stand, Part 1" and "Part 2", the seventh and eighth episodes of Voltron: Legendary Defender, Season 7 (2018)

== Music ==
- The Last Stand (Boot Camp Clik album), an album by Boot Camp Clik 2006
- The Last Stand (Sabaton album), an album by Swedish power-metal band Sabaton 2016
- "Last Stand", song by Adelitas Way from Adelitas Way

== Other uses ==
- Custer's Last Stand, also known as the Battle of the Little Bighorn, a battle in 1876
- The Last Stand, a gameplay mode for the video game Warhammer 40,000: Dawn of War II
- The Last Stand, a DLC campaign for the video game Left 4 Dead 2.
