= Fired on Mars =

American adult animated comedy series

- Promotional poster for Fired on Mars
- Genre: Science fiction; Workplace comedy
- Created by: Nate Sherman; Nick Vokey
- Starring: Luke Wilson
- Composer: Grey Gersten
- Country of origin: United States
- Original language: English
- No. of seasons: 1
- No. of episodes: 8

Production
- Executive producers: Nate Sherman; Nick Vokey; Carson Mell; Brian A. Miller; Luke Wilson (Note: co-executive producer)
- Producers: Jackie Buscarino (Note: supervising producer); Casey Alexander
- Running time: 23–25 minutes
- Production companies: Pat & Mike Productions; NN Productions

Original release
- Network: HBO Max
- Release: April 20 – May 11, 2023

Fired on Mars is an American adult animated science fiction comedy television series created by Nate Sherman and Nick Vokey for HBO Max. It is based on their 2016 animated short film of the same name.

== Plot ==
Based on a 2016 short of the same name by Nate Sherman and Nick Vokey, Fired on Mars follows Jeff Cooper, a graphic designer living and working on Mars for the start-up technology company Mars.ly in the planet's sole colony. Jeff is fired after his job is deemed redundant and with no alternative roles nor an option to return to Earth, he becomes trapped in the Mars.ly colony. He struggles to reinvent himself and find a purpose using teachings from eccentric gurus and attempts to escape the indifferent Mars.ly corporate structure while trying to maintain a long-distance relationship with his girlfriend Hannah on Earth.

== Cast ==
- Luke Wilson as Jeff Cooper: A graphic designer on Mars who is fired from his job at Mars.ly
- Tim Heidecker as Darren Young, Mars.ly's CCER
- Sean Wing as Brandon O'Brien, Mars.ly's COO
- Chase Bernstein as Hannah: Jeff's girlfriend who is still on Earth
- Pete Davidson as Martin, Mars.ly's office supplies manager (uncredited role)
- Cedric Yarbrough as Jaxton Olivier: A career-focused and motivated Mars.ly employee who befriends Jeff
- Amara Karan as Crystal
- Pamela Adlon as Reagan Smith: The boss of Mars.ly's Dreamspiration division
- Leslie David Baker as Hubert Danielson
- Frankie Quiñones as Ted
- Al Di as Di Wei
- Stephen Root as Mark
- Adewale Akinnuoye-Agbaje as Abbas
- Emily Watson as Sheila: Mars.ly's chief biologist and leader of the Bucky rebels
- Thomas Haden Church as Trevor Sullivan
- Carson Mell as Sluggo Buchinsky
- David Faustino as Tee: A former DJ and the son of the CEO, Falco. He serves as Mars.ly's creative director.
- Dasha Nekrasova as Liz
- Dan Soder as Don
- Dawnn Lewis as Judith
- John Noble as Falco, CEO of Mars.ly

== Production ==
Fired on Mars is executive produced by Sherman, Vokey, Carson Mell, Brian A. Miller, alongside supervising producer Jackie Buscarino. Grey Gersten serves as composer and Rob Getzschman as editor. Rough Draft Studios provided animation services.

== Episodes ==
No.	Title	Directed by	Written by	Original release date
1	"The One Way Trip"	Dwayne Carey-Hill	Nate Sherman and Nick Vokey	April 20, 2023
After working on Mars for seven months as a graphic designer for the Mars.ly, Jeff Cooper's role is deemed redundant and his employment is placed "on hold". Restless, Jeff searches for hobbies and becomes fixated on obsessively labeling everyday objects, eventually acknowledging that his position is effectively over and that his colleagues do not miss him. Isolated and depressed, he overeats, neglects hygiene, and struggles to maintain his long-distance relationship with his girlfriend Hannah, who remains on Earth. When an employee in the Dreamspiration department dies unexpectedly, Jeff attempts to take her position, but the job is instead given to Ted, a former employee kept in long-term suspended sleep inside the Tank, a water-filled hibernation container. Outraged at being passed over, Jeff confronts his supervisors, Darren and Brandon, who inform him that he must enter the Tank or lose access to all Mars.ly property, including his apartment and food supplies. Jeff instead steals provisions and prepares to flee the colony onto the barren Martian surface. Before he can leave, he receives an accidentally dialed call from Hannah, during which he overhears her colleague advising her not to travel to Mars. Enraged, Jeff slams his phone into the airlock door, triggering an explosive decompression.
2	"The Book of Reagan"	Ira Sherak	Nate Sherman and Nick Vokey	April 20, 2023
Jeff is rescued unconscious from the Martian surface and placed in the Tank, where he remains for two months until it malfunctions and nearly kills him. Although his life is saved, Jeff is left critically injured. In an attempt to placate him, Darren and Brandon assign him an internship in the Dreamspiration department, the colony's human resources division. The department is overseen by the demanding Reagan, whose career-driven assistant, Jaxton, is tasked with training Jeff. After Jaxton catches Jeff making a personal call to Hannah during work hours, he sends him to observe "the baby," a solitary infant kept for entertainment. While waiting in line, Jeff's injured eye begins bleeding, disturbing other patrons, and he accidentally strikes a security guard, leading to his arrest before he persuades the guard to release him. The following day, Jeff performs well in his duties, impressing Jaxton, who explains how he manipulates oxygen and nitrogen dioxide levels to keep Reagan calm and productive. Jeff bonds with Jaxton, who agrees to distract Reagan during her birthday while Jeff prepares a party in hopes of impressing her and earning a promotion. When the cake, flowers, and other supplies are unavailable, Jeff poorly improvises using inflated rubber gloves, hay bales, and rum balls. Overwhelmed, he alters the gas mixture in Reagan's office, causing an explosion when her birthday candles are lit.
3	"12 Rules for Extraordinary People"	Crystal Chesney-Thompson	Katie Greenway and Sam West	April 27, 2023
The explosion injures the entire Dreamspiration staff, and Jeff faces a potential sentence of up to two years in the Tank. Jaxton, believing he forgot to turn off the gas system, accepts responsibility and confesses. Jeff unsuccessfully attempts to admit his own role and is instead promoted to Jaxton's position. The Dreamspiration staff harbor resentment toward Jaxton, and Reagan admits she has made plans for him to be placed in the Tank. Jeff later meets a drunken Jaxton, who reveals that the necklace he carries contains information about unethical acts committed by Mars.ly. that could be used as blackmail. Jeff steals the necklace in hopes of using it to save Jaxton, but discovers it contains only a childhood television appearance of Jaxton, then overweight, which he kept as motivation to improve himself and change his name. During a Dreamspiration support meeting, Jeff confesses that he caused the explosion and is placed in the Tank once more. Inside, he dreams of a domestic life with Hannah until the Tank malfunctions again, releasing him shortly before it explodes. Jeff notices evidence of sabotage to the Tank and recognizes it as Jaxton's work. Afterward, Jeff contacts Hannah, who admits she had hoped his time in the Tank would spare her from having to confess that she will not be joining him on Mars. Their relationship ends. Jeff devotes himself to self-improvement—reading, learning languages, playing guitar, exercising, and participating in new activities—but eventually relapses into overeating and idleness.
4	"Banana Express"	Andrew Han	Gonzalo Cordova and Zoe Jarman	April 27, 2023
Stock manager Martin offers Jeff a job working under Sluggo Buchinsky. The two perform manual labor on the Martian surface, relocating rocks between nearby sites. Jeff notices a robot transporting crates labeled "Bananas" into a restricted cave. Jeff later meets with Crystal, a doctor who evaluates the physical effects of surface work on both men. As Jeff continues his shifts, he repeatedly observes the same crates being moved. During one shift, Crystal invites Jeff to her apartment. He removes the protective covering from one finger so he can type a reply to her message, immediately suffering severe frostbite that causes the finger to blacken and eventually detach. Crystal reveals she previously lost her own thumb after running out of labeling supplies and accidentally spilling acid on it. Having recently ended a relationship, she has a one-night stand with Jeff but makes it clear she does not want anything further, leaving him disappointed. Jeff later drunkenly calls Jaxton, who helps lift his spirits. Jeff and Sluggo are reassigned to catch rats in the colony's sewers, where Jeff again spots a crate labeled "Bananas." He follows it and discovers the buried remains of the original colony, where a secret meeting is taking place involving Martin, Crystal, and biologist Hubert. Jeff is captured and overhears plans to kill him, but manages to escape, inadvertently appearing in the background of a live news broadcast. Darren interrogates Jeff and informs him that a new Tank is being constructed, though Jeff does not disclose what he witnessed. That night, Jeff is kidnapped by the group, who offer him a place among them.
5	"The God of War"	Edmund Fong	Nate Sherman and Nick Vokey	May 4, 2023
The group, known as the Buckys, are revealed to be a collective of intellectuals, including scientists, engineers, academics, and poets, who plan to abandon the Mars.ly colony and its corporate-driven values to establish a new settlement dedicated to advancing humanity. As Jeff takes on increasing responsibility within the group, he grows distant from Jaxton, repeatedly disappointing him. Sluggo gifts Jeff a prosthetic finger in recognition of his respectful attitude. Martin reassigns Jeff to overseeing the feeding of locusts intended as a protein source for the future Bucky colony, while warning him not to overfeed the insects to prevent swarming and overpopulation. The Buckys' leader, Sheila, is assigned to investigate a methane spike outside the colony and uses the mission as an opportunity to scout a potential site for their settlement. She brings Martin, Don, Judith, Crystal, and Jeff along. Meanwhile, Brandon, Mars.ly's Earth-based director, offers Jeff the position of creative director for Marsiversary—the colony's 30th anniversary celebration—after the original director overshoots Mars and becomes lost in space. During the Martian excursion, the group attempts to locate an underground ice sheet critical to their plans as a sandstorm approaches. After repeated failures and with time running short, Sheila uses dowsing rods and successfully finds the ice. The group flees the storm, becoming separated while seeking shelter. Jeff and Sheila take refuge in nearby caves, where they discover the corpses of astronauts from a previous mission. They later reunite with the others and begin the return journey, but Sheila slips down a slope, cracks her visor, and freezes to death. The group mourns her loss and appoints Abbas as their new leader. Traumatized by the experience, Jeff accepts the creative director position.
6	"Back in The High Life Again"	Zach Bellissimo and Christopher Nance	Bernardo Britto and Alexandra Johnstone	May 4, 2023
Jeff struggles to balance his role as creative director with his responsibilities to the Buckys, including securing supplies and feeding the locusts, further straining his relationship with Jaxton. Inspired by a retro pornographic magazine given to him by Hubert, Jeff develops a retro-style campaign for Marsiversary. He presents it to Tee, the colony's creative director and the son of CEO Falco, and it is initially well received. However, Ted objects, swaying Tee, who instructs Jeff to instead draw inspiration from war propaganda. Pressed for time, Jeff rigs Sluggo's cuckoo clock to automatically activate the locust feeding mechanism so he can focus on Marsiversary. Meanwhile, the Buckys vote on a departure timeline, having secured supplies hidden in the banana crates. Distracted, Jeff inadvertently votes for an accelerated two-week schedule, prompting the others to follow suit. While Jeff and Crystal are involved in a romantic encounter, Sluggo hears his clock during rat patrol and breaks through the wall of the locust room to retrieve it. In the process, a propped chair falls onto the feed button, overfeeding the locusts. The insects swarm and invade the colony, forcing the Buckys to scramble to conceal their stockpiled resources and plans.
7	"The Fibonacci Sequence"	Zach Bellissimo, John Martinez, Christopher Nance, and Ira Sherak	Carson Mell	May 11, 2023
Abbas and Martin destroy evidence to conceal the existence of the Buckys, but are unable to recover Hubert's labeled DNA samples because he changed the safe's password. Colony security begins investigating the abandoned original colony and uncovers the Buckys' extensive cache of stolen resources and food supplies. Darren covers up the locust infestation by claiming it was a breeding program that spiraled out of control, attracting the attention of Trevor Sullivan, a paranoid former mechanic prone to conspiracy theories. Jeff is blamed for the outbreak and goes into hiding as the Buckys are now being pursued as terrorists. Despite this, Jeff's new Marsiversary campaign is well received by Tee. Sullivan convinces Darren to hire him to track down the Buckys and later encounters Hubert attempting to recover the DNA samples. The two fight, ending when Hubert tricks Sullivan into falling into a waste disposal chute. Crystal ends her relationship with Jeff over his mistake and his decision to return to a corporate role after he urges her to remain at Mars.ly. Jeff is summoned by Tee to the exclusive Centauri House nightclub, where he receives a call from Hannah informing him that she is coming to Mars. Tee confides that the Mars.ly. colony is inadequate for men like them and proposes detonating nuclear devices at Mars's north and south poles, a plan that would allow humans to walk on the planet's surface without space suits but the radiation would likely kill everyone not sheltered in Tee's secret bunker.
8	"Marsiversary"	Andrew Han and John Martinez	Nate Sherman and Nick Vokey	May 11, 2023
More equipment is stolen from Mars.ly. by an unknown party, and Brandon, frustrated by Darren's failure to control the situation, fires him. Sullivan escapes the waste disposal area and returns to Darren, revealing Hubert's involvement. Darren dismisses the claim but permits Sullivan to investigate Hubert's apartment, where Sullivan takes Hubert's aftershave. Darren later orders security to arrest Sullivan, but he evades them by retreating back into the waste chute. Hubert goes into hiding, but Sullivan uses the aftershave to enable a scent-tracking robot to locate him. Crystal searches unsuccessfully for Jeff and retrieves a letter from his room, which she delivers to Jaxton. As Mars.ly. and Earth prepare to celebrate Marsiversary, Crystal sneaks into the event. When a member of Tee's entourage mentions that Jeff intended to rub Santa's belly—a ritual he and Sluggo used for luck before surface missions—Crystal rushes to the airlock. On Earth, Falco delivers a presentation and introduces Jeff's segment, but Jeff does not appear. Instead, a prerecorded video plays promoting life outside the colony and criticizing Mars.ly, infuriating Falco. A despondent Darren places himself into the Tank. Jaxton reads Jeff's letter, which asks him to join Jeff's new project. Crystal reaches the airlock moments after Jeff departs the colony in a truck loaded with supplies.

== Reception ==
Slash Film called it "the best new adult animation series of 2023"––"pushing the boundaries of what an adult animated series can be" and "a worthy successor to a show like Bojack Horseman." Inverse's Jake Kleinman praised the show as "a lot of fun".
