= All in the Bunker =

- Directed by: Andrew Overtoom
- Written by: Dani Michaeli; Andrew Overtoom
- Produced by: Jon Brown; Tricia Noble; Andrew Overtoom; Noeli Rosas
- Starring: Kurtwood Smith; Cheryl Hines; Don Novello; Marco Cinello
- Narrated by: S. Scott Bullock
- Cinematography: Andrew Overtoom
- Release date: 2009
- Running time: 8 minutes
- Country: United States
- Language: English

All in the Bunker is a 2009 animated short film written, directed, and animated by Andrew Overtoom. It is a Go Mental Productions film and stars Kurtwood Smith and Cheryl Hines.

== Cast ==
- Kurtwood Smith as Adolf Hitler
- Cheryl Hines as Eva Braun
- Don Novello as Pope Pius XII
- Marco Cinello as Benito Mussolini
- S. Scott Bullock as the narrator
