= Let He Who Is Without Sin... =

- Star Trek: Deep Space Nine episode
- Episode no.: Season 5 Episode 7
- Directed by: René Auberjonois
- Written by: Ira Steven Behr; Robert Hewitt Wolfe
- Production code: 505
- Original air date: November 11, 1996

Guest appearances
- Vanessa L. Williams as Arandis; Monte Markham as Fullerton; Chase Masterson as Leeta; Frank Kopyc as Bolian Aide; Blair Valk as Risian Woman; Zora DeHorter as Risian Woman; Mark Allen Shepherd as Morn

Episode chronology
← Previous "Trials and Tribble-ations"	Next → "Things Past"
- Star Trek: Deep Space Nine season 5

"Let He Who Is Without Sin..." is the 105th episode of the television series Star Trek: Deep Space Nine, the seventh episode of the fifth season. It aired in syndication on American television in November 1996.

Set in the 24th century, the series follows the adventures of the crew of the space station Deep Space Nine. This episode takes place on Risa, a fictional planet in the Star Trek universe that is a popular vacation spot, with an open attitude toward sexuality and a sophisticated weather control system. In this episode, romantically-involved Deep Space Nine crew members Jadzia Dax and Worf visit Risa during a rough spot in their relationship, where Worf becomes involved with a movement in opposition to Risa's creature comforts. Vanessa L. Williams guest stars as Arandis, the social director of a Risan resort.

The episode's title comes from the teaching of the adulterous woman in the Gospel of John. Its premiere had 6.78 million viewers.

== Plot ==
Worf's relationship with Jadzia Dax hits a rough spot, and he plans to discuss his feelings during their vacation on Risa. They arrive — along with Dax's friends Julian Bashir, Quark, and Leeta — at the beautiful, climate controlled "Pleasure Planet", and Worf meets Arandis, the social director of the Tembiti Lagoon resort. He is dismayed to learn that Arandis is a former lover of Curzon Dax, Jadzia's predecessor as host of the Dax symbiont, whose memories Jadzia shares.

Worf is approached by Pascal Fullerton, leader of the New Essentialists, a group bent on "restoring the moral and cultural traditions of the Federation". Worf attends the group's rally, where Fullerton warns that Risa's focus on pleasure indicates that the citizens of the Federation have become weak, and will be defenseless if an enemy attacks. Later that night, a group of Essentialists vandalize the Risian Solarium. Dax realizes that the attack is just a stunt to convince vacationers that they are vulnerable.

That evening, Worf accuses Dax of not taking their relationship seriously. The next day, Worf sees Dax with Arandis and is overcome with jealousy. He tells Fullerton that he knows how to drive the guests from Risa. Soon afterwards, a powerful storm moves in without warning, putting an end to the resort's outdoor activities. Fullerton and Worf reveal that Worf has rigged an uplink device to sabotage the planetary weather grid; Risa will experience a rainy climate for the next few days. Many guests are furious, and some leave the resort. Worf is satisfied, but Fullerton decides to go one step further.

Dax accuses Worf of destroying Risa because he does not trust her. He reluctantly reveals that his restrained attitude results from a childhood incident during a school soccer game, in which he accidentally killed a human schoolmate. Ever since, Worf has felt obligated to hold back his emotions for fear that he might hurt someone else. Dax begins to understand, but the moment is interrupted when an earthquake shakes Risa. Rushing to Fullerton's headquarters, they find that he is using the uplink to cause the quake and drive the vacationers off the planet. Worf intimidates Fullerton into handing over the uplink and stops the tremors, reminding Fullerton that trust is another core value of the Federation. Once the weather grid is back online and the pleasant climate is restored, Worf and Dax get ready to enjoy the remainder of their vacation.

Meanwhile, Bashir and Leeta end their romantic relationship via a Bajoran custom called the "Rite of Separation", and Leeta announces that she is attracted to Quark's brother Rom.

== Production ==
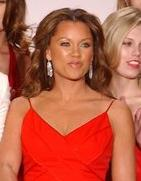
Vanessa L. Williams guest stars as Arandis

The episode was directed by series cast regular Rene Auberjonois, and written by Robert Hewitt Wolfe and Ira Steven Behr.

=== Cast ===
The episode has several guest actors playing the various characters on Risa. This includes Monte Markham as Fullerton, Frank Kopyc as a Bolian, and Blake Valk and Zora Dehorter as Risians. The cast also includes Vanessa L. Williams as Arandis.

The recurring character Leeta, played by Chase Masterson, is also in the episode.

== Reception ==
A 2015 binge-watching guide for Star Trek: Deep Space Nine by Wired recommended skipping this episode. The criticism of this episode they offer is that the episode "doubles down with the revelation that, hey, did you know that events in your childhood can shape the person you become as an adult? It's true!".

In December 2018, CBR included this episode in a list of Star Trek episodes which are "so bad they must be seen". They say that "The potential was there for comedy with Worf trying to handle being on vacation and Dax cutting loose." However, they criticize the set design, which they say "looks like a cheap resort". They say that Worf is out of character in this episode and that the fights between him and Jadzia are terrible. Overall, they criticise it for "the bad writing and dumb plot".

In 2018, SyFy included this episode on their binge-watching guide for episodes focusing on Jadzia Dax.

In 2019, Screen Rant ranked this episode worst of the ten worst episodes of Star Trek: Deep Space Nine. They note that at that time it had a rating of 5.6/10 based on user rankings on the site IMDB. Their criticism of the episode is that Worf treats Jadzia so badly that "Fans hate that Dax and Worf make up at the end." In 2019, they ranked it the third worst episode of the Star Trek franchise based on IMDB rankings. Here, the episode is criticised for having "a jarring storyline amidst such an exotic locale."

== Related episodes ==
The planet Risa was introduced in "Captain's Holiday", an episode of Star Trek: The Next Generation aired in 1990. Risa is also featured in the Star Trek: Enterprise episode "Two Days and Two Nights".
