= Big Wave Dave's =

- Title screen
- Genre: Sitcom
- Created by: Ken Levine; David Isaacs
- Written by: Ken Levine & David Isaacs
- Directed by: Andy Ackerman
- Starring: Adam Arkin; Jane Kaczmarek; Patrick Breen; Kurtwood Smith; David Morse
- Composer: Paul Kreiling
- Country of origin: United States
- Original language: English
- No. of seasons: 1
- No. of episodes: 6

Production
- Executive producers: Ken Levine & David Isaacs
- Producer: Larina Adamson
- Camera setup: Multi-camera
- Running time: 30 minutes
- Production companies: Levine & Issacs Productions; Paramount Television

Original release
- Network: CBS
- Release: August 9 – September 13, 1993

Big Wave Dave's is a sitcom that ran on CBS from August 9, 1993, until September 13, 1993. In it, three friends decide to drop everything and run a surf shop in Oahu, Hawaii. When they arrive, they find out that it's not as easy as they thought. The show was produced by Levine & Isaacs Productions in association with Paramount Television.

== Pilot synopsis ==
The pilot episode opens with three friends, Marshall Fisher (Adam Arkin), Richie Lamonica (Patrick Breen), and Dave Bell (David Morse), sitting in a bar, talking. Apparently, Marshall has just lost his job, and Dave is divorcing his wife. Dave comes up with the idea of starting a surf shop in Oahu, Hawaii called Big Wave Dave's, and the whole club starts dreaming about it. Dave suggests that they should really do it; his friends are a bit doubtful, but they eventually decide to go along with it. But then they think about Marshall's wife, and they have to convince her. That same night, the three guys go over to Marshall's house to convince his wife, Karen (Jane Kaczmarek). Out of the blue, Karen decides to go along with them.

All of them, very excited, arrive in Hawaii a few weeks later. Karen tries to help Dave and Marshall with decorating the store, but they want to do that on their own. After looking around the store a bit, Dave decides to go surfing. A few seconds later, Richie comes into the store saying that he found himself in Hawaii. Meanwhile, a man with a barrow carrying Dave comes in, saying that he blames the Beach Boys for all the surfers at the beach. Dave had had a surfing accident but seems to be all right. The man introduces himself as Jack Lord and says that he hates newcomers on the beach and that he had named himself after his idol, Jack Lord. When he leaves the shop, it starts raining. Two hours later, when it's still raining, Marshall decides to leave, but nobody wants to go with him. Dave doesn't want to go because this was his idea, and Richie still believes he's a different person in Hawaii. When a woman walks in, Richie wants to prove that he's different here; after saying hello to her, however, he decides to go back to Chicago. Just when the guys are about to leave, Karen walks in and gives them a speech that pulls them back in. When Marshall still isn't happy, Karen reveals that she became pregnant the night they decided to go to Hawaii.

== Cast and characters ==
- Adam Arkin as Marshall Fisher, a former lawyer, who's the leader of the group. At first he needed some time adjusting to Hawaii, because he couldn't leave his old life behind, but later he fitted in just right.
- Jane Kaczmarek as Karin Fisher, Marshall's wife, a lawyer like her husband used to be. According to Marshall, she knows everything. In the store she's in charge of the inventory, promotion, accounting, hiring, firing and any long range direction.
- Patrick Breen as Richie Lamonica, a former high-school typing teacher who claims he found a new life in Hawaii, but eventually backs out. In the pilot episode he states that he never had any other friends than Dave and Marshall. Richie has a one-room apartment.
- Kurtwood Smith as Jack Lord an elderly man that lives close to Big Wave Dave's. He's a big fan of the real Jack Lord and he worked as an extra on Hawaii Five-O, and, as he describes it, that's when the Lord came into his life. He also changed his name because he was being "chased" by the Diner's Club. He usually dreams that he's much bigger than he is in real life and he has lived on the beach for 20 years.
- David Morse as Dave Bell, the person who thought of starting Big Wave Dave's which is named after him. Before he and his friends went to Hawaii he was Marshall's stockbroker. He also explained that the only day in his life that when he was ever happy was when he was surfing.

== Episodes ==
No.	Title	Directed by	Written by	Original release date	Prod. code
1	"Pilot"	Andy Ackerman	Ken Levine & David Isaacs	August 9, 1993	40811-001
2	"The Six Stages of Marshall"	Andy Ackerman	Ken Levine & David Isaacs	August 16, 1993	40811-002
3	"Making Up Is Hard to Do"	Andy Ackerman	Larry Balmagia	August 23, 1993	40811-003
4	"Dave's Big Wave"	Andy Ackerman	Dan Staley & Rob Long	August 30, 1993	40811-004
5	"The Adventures of Ozzie and Marshall"	Andy Ackerman	Ken Levine, David Isaacs, Dan Staley & Rob Long	September 6, 1993	40811-005
6	"The Old Men and the Sea (a.k.a. Him)"	Andy Ackerman	Ken Levine & David Isaacs	September 13, 1993	40811-006
