= Things Past (Star Trek: Deep Space Nine) =

- Star Trek: Deep Space Nine episode
- Episode no.: Season 5 Episode 8
- Directed by: LeVar Burton
- Written by: Michael Taylor
- Production code: 506
- Original air date: November 18, 1996

Guest appearances
- Marc Alaimo as Gul Dukat; Victor Bevine as Belar; Andrew J. Robinson as Garak; Kurtwood Smith as Thrax

Episode chronology
| ← Previous "Let He Who Is Without Sin..." | Next → "The Ascent" |
- Star Trek: Deep Space Nine season 5

"Things Past" is the 106th episode of the television series Star Trek: Deep Space Nine, the eighth episode of the fifth season.

Set in the 24th century, the series follows the adventures on the space station Deep Space Nine near the planet Bajor, as Bajor recovers from a brutal, decades-long occupation by the imperialistic Cardassians. In this episode, DS9's captain Benjamin Sisko, security chief Odo and science officer Jadzia Dax, along with exiled Cardassian spy Garak, experience events that took place on Deep Space Nine during the Cardassian occupation, from the perspective of falsely-accused Bajoran prisoners.

"Things Past" received a Nielsen rating of 6.0 corresponding to 5,800,000 viewers, when it was shown on television in 1996.

== Plot ==
While returning in a runabout from a conference on Bajor, Sisko, Odo, Dax and Garak encounter an unknown spatial anomaly. When the runabout arrives at Deep Space Nine, all four are discovered to be in a comatose state.

Meanwhile, the four find themselves years in the past, on Terok Nor (as DS9 was then called) during the Cardassian occupation of Bajor. They appear to have taken the identities of Bajorans. Odo, acting anxious and suspicious, reveals that the Bajorans whose lives they have assumed were executed for an attempt on Cardassian prefect Gul Dukat's life, although they were innocent of the crime. Inconsistencies soon pop up: Thrax (Kurtwood Smith), Odo's predecessor as chief of security, is present, but Garak discovers that the current date is during the time when Odo was security chief.

They set about finding a way to escape the station and avoid execution, but when the assassination attempt is made, they are arrested as Odo predicted. Odo pleads with Thrax to conduct a thorough investigation, which will exonerate the Bajorans, but Thrax is implacable. Odo is eventually forced to accept the truth: it was himself, not Thrax, who had the Bajorans executed, although the evidence against them was largely circumstantial, as Dukat simply wanted to make an example of them. He admits that he cared more about the rule of law than justice, and he vowed never to do so again.

The four awaken in the infirmary, where Dr. Bashir reveals that the anomaly triggered a telepathic experience; Odo was thinking about his guilt over the executions at the time the runabout encountered the anomaly. In the final scene of the episode, Kira Nerys, the Bajoran first officer of Deep Space Nine and Odo's good friend, asks Odo if any other innocent people died on his watch; he replies that he can't be sure, but that he hopes not.

== Reception ==
Tor.com gave the episode four out of ten.
