= The Ascent (Star Trek: Deep Space Nine) =

- Star Trek: Deep Space Nine episode
- Episode no.: Season 5 Episode 9
- Directed by: Allan Kroeker
- Written by: Ira Steven Behr; Robert Hewitt Wolfe
- Production code: 507
- Original air date: November 25, 1996

Guest appearances
- Max Grodénchik as Rom; Aron Eisenberg as Nog

Episode chronology
| ← Previous "Things Past" | Next → "Rapture" |
- Star Trek: Deep Space Nine season 5

"The Ascent" is the 107th episode of the television series Star Trek: Deep Space Nine, the ninth episode of the fifth season.

Set in the 24th century, the series follows the adventures of the crew of the Starfleet-run space station Deep Space Nine. In this episode, Deep Space Nine's security chief Odo is stranded on a remote planet with the small-time criminal Quark, and the two must hike up a mountain together to call for help. Meanwhile, Starfleet cadet Nog returns to Deep Space Nine from Starfleet Academy and has friction with his roommate Jake Sisko.

== Plot ==
Odo is escorting Quark to a grand jury hearing so that he can testify against the criminal Orion Syndicate. Halfway to their destination, they discover that a bomb has been planted on their ship. An attempt to transport it away causes it to detonate, damaging the ship and forcing them to crash-land on a frozen, barely habitable planet.

Their communication system is damaged and they have very little food. As they face the prospect of death by either starvation or freezing, Quark has an idea: disconnect the ship's subspace transmitter and carry it to the top of a nearby mountain, where the atmosphere may be thin enough to let them send a signal for help.

Sharing one set of cold-weather gear between them, they begin hauling the heavy transmitter toward the mountain, bickering all the way. They are dismayed to find that the journey will take several days, rather than a few hours as they had originally estimated. As they reach the mountain and begin to climb, their disagreement deteriorates into a shoving match that sends them tumbling down the slope. Odo suffers a broken leg in the fall.

Quark tries to drag Odo up the mountain, but it soon proves to be too great an effort for him. Odo insists that Quark leave him behind and continue alone to the top, but Quark, exhausted and hungry, is ready to give up. After Odo tries to take the transmitter himself despite his injury, Quark is shamed into resuming his attempt. He does not return by nightfall; assuming that he has died without reaching the summit, Odo expects that he too will perish and begins to record a message intended for whoever finds his body.

Suddenly Odo and Quark are beamed to the starship Defiant; Quark did reach the peak and send a distress signal. As they recuperate in the infirmary, they offer each other an apology of sorts by confirming that they were sincere in their earlier declarations of mutual hatred, followed by mutual snickering.

Meanwhile, on the station, Nog returns from Starfleet Academy to begin a field study assignment. He moves in with Jake Sisko, but the two come into conflict as roommates. Nog's strictly disciplined lifestyle as a cadet conflicts with Jake's more relaxed attitudes towards life, cleanliness, and exercise. They eventually reconcile, thanks to the efforts of their fathers, Benjamin Sisko and Rom.

== Production ==
The outdoor shots were done at Mount Whitney in California, the highest peak in the contiguous United States.

This is the final episode of Deep Space Nine to regularly feature the design of Starfleet uniforms that were introduced at the beginning of the series, although they would continue to be worn for the duration of the parallel series Star Trek: Voyager.

== Reception ==
Tor.com gave the episode six out of ten.
