= Kurtwood Smith =

American actor (born 1943)

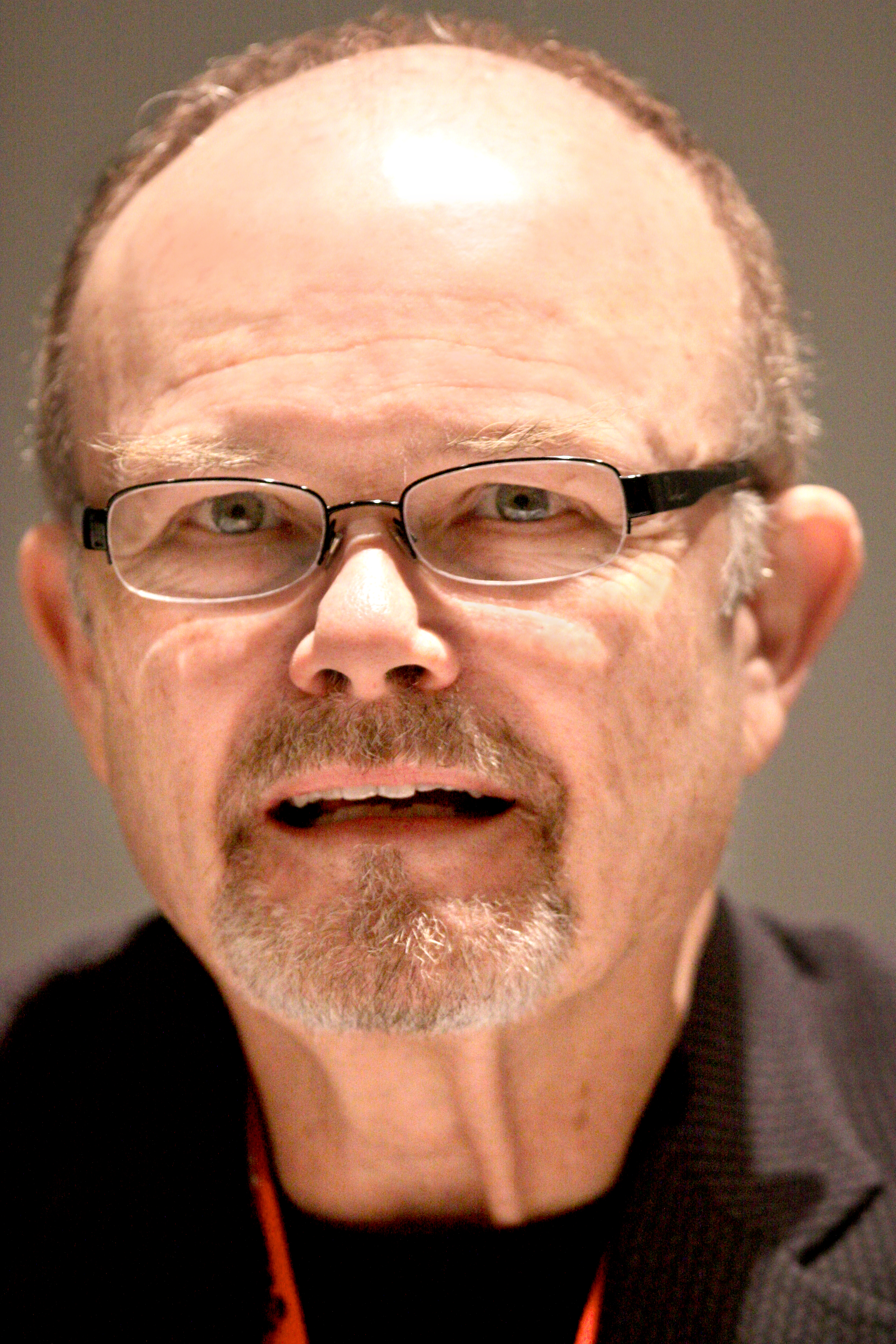
- Smith at the 2010 San Diego Comic-Con
- Born: Kurtwood Larson Smith; July 3, 1943 (age 83); New Lisbon, Wisconsin, U.S.
- Education: San José State University (BA); Stanford University (MFA)
- Occupation: Actor
- Years active: 1970–present
- Spouses: Cecilia Souza (m. 1964; div. 1974); Joan Pirkle (m. 1988)
- Children: 2

Kurtwood Larson Smith (born July 3, 1943) is an American actor. He is known for playing Clarence Boddicker in RoboCop (1987), Robert Griggs in Rambo III (1988), Thomas Perry in Dead Poets Society (1989), Stump Sisson in A Time to Kill (1996), as well as Red Forman in That '70s Show (1998–2006) and That '90s Show (2023–2024), along with his many appearances in science fiction films and television programs (Lou Grant, Star Trek, The X-Files). He also starred in the seventh season of 24. He voiced Gene on Regular Show (2012–2017), portrayed Leslie Claret on Patriot (2015–2018), and Old Man Peterson on The Ranch (2017–2020).

== Early life and education ==
Smith's father, Major George Smith, was killed in action on March 25, 1945, while returning from leading the 49th Troop Carrier Squadron, 313th Troop Carrier Group during Operation Varsity in World War II. Smith would later say of his father "Though I never knew him, I always remember him!"

Smith grew up in the San Fernando Valley and graduated from Canoga Park High School in Canoga Park, California in 1961; Smith graduated from San Jose State College (now San José State University) in 1965 with a B.A. and Stanford University in 1969 with an M.F.A. He was an instructor of theater arts at Cañada College from 1969 to 1975.

== Career ==
On stage, Smith won three Drama-Logue Awards for his performances in Billy Budd, Idiot's Delight, and Green Grow the Lilacs. In his film career, he portrayed Clarence Boddicker in Paul Verhoeven's science fiction film RoboCop and the father role as Red Forman on the Fox sitcom That '70s Show, which ran from 1998 to 2006. After That '70s Show ended, Smith played Senator Blaine Mayer in the seventh season of the action thriller 24, and portrayed Dick Clayton in the CBS series Worst Week. He enjoyed a recurring role as a rogue FBI agent in Seasons 3–5 of the NBC (later CBS) series Medium, appearing in later episodes as a ghost after his character's death. He played the main character Henry Langston in the ABC sci-fi/drama Resurrection which ran for two seasons (2014–15). He was a regular on the Amazon original dramedy series Patriot (2015-2018). In 2023, he reprised the role of Red Forman in That '90s Show, a sequel series of That '70s Show.

His other roles included playing the leader of the Ku Klux Klan, Stump Sisson, in A Time to Kill. He also played the role of Mr. Sue on Fox's "espionage comedy" The New Adventures of Beans Baxter in 1987. He also starred as Neil's father in 1989's Dead Poets Society. He made a number of appearances in the Star Trek franchise, playing the President of the Federation in Star Trek VI: The Undiscovered Country, a Cardassian named Thrax in the Star Trek: Deep Space Nine episode "Things Past", and a Krenim scientist named Annorax in the Star Trek: Voyager episode "Year of Hell".

He also has an extensive voice acting résumé, appearing in computer games such as Fallout Tactics: Brotherhood of Steel, and FreeSpace 2, and on a number of animated series. He played a recurring role on the claymation series Gary & Mike as the vengeful Officer Dick and voiced the dinosaurian military commander character General Galapagos in the Fox animated series Terrible Thunderlizards. He played the voice of Bob Johnson on Squirrel Boy and Kanjar Ro in Green Lantern: First Flight and starred as the sheriff in Last of the Dogmen. Smith appeared on the Netflix series The Ranch as Mr. Peterson, a terminally ill farmer. Smith worked in the stop-motion AMC+ series Ultra City Smiths, where he voiced Carpenter K. Smith.

== Filmography ==
=== Film ===
Year	Title	Role	Notes
1980	Roadie	Security Guard	Film debut
1981	Zoot Suit	Sergeant Smith	
1983	Staying Alive	Choreographer	
1983	Going Berserk	Clarence	
1984	Flashpoint	Carson	
1987	RoboCop	Clarence Boddicker	
1987	The Delos Adventure	Arthur McNeil	
1988	Rambo III	Robert Griggs	
1988	Two Idiots in Hollywood	District Attorney	
1989	True Believer	Robert Reynard	
1989	Dead Poets Society	Mr. Perry	
1989	Heart of Dixie	Professor Flournoy	
1990	Quick Change	Russ Crane/Vince Lombino	
1991	Oscar	Lt. Toomey, Chicago PD	
1991	Company Business	Elliot Jaffe, CIA	
1991	Star Trek VI: The Undiscovered Country	Federation President	
1991	Shadows and Fog	Vogel's Follower	
1992	Fortress	Prison Director Poe	
1993	Boxing Helena	Dr. Alan Harrison	
1993	The Crush	Cliff Forrester	
1993	Heart and Souls	Patterson	Uncredited
1993	Big Wave Daves	Jack Lord	
1993	RoboCop 3	Clarence Boddicker	Archive footage from 1987 film
1994	Dead on Sight	Julian Thompson	
1995	To Die For	Earl Stone	
1995	Under Siege 2: Dark Territory	General Stanley Cooper	
1995	Last of the Dogmen	Sheriff Deegan	
1996	Citizen Ruth	Norm Stoney	
1996	Broken Arrow	Secretary of Defense, Baird	
1996	A Time to Kill	Stump Sisson	
1997	Prefontaine	Curtis Cunningham	
1998	Shelter	Tom Cantrell	
1998	Deep Impact	Otis Hefter	
1999	Girl, Interrupted	Dr. Crumble	
2002	Teddy Bears' Picnic	Secretary of Transportation, William Easter	
2004	Evil Remains	Dr. Theodore Rosen	
2005	The Trouble with Dee Dee	William Rutherford	
2006	Hard Scrambled	Benno	
2007	Entry Level	Nick	
2009	Green Lantern: First Flight	Kanjar Ro (voice)	
2009	All in the Bunker	Adolf Hitler	Short subject
2011	Cedar Rapids	Orin Helgesson	
2012	Men in a Box	Dr. Skinner	Short subject
2012	Hitchcock	Geoffrey Shurlock	
2013	Turbo	Indy CEO (voice)	
2015	Raise the ToyGantic	Ted Greenley	Short subject
2015	Regular Show: The Movie	Gene (voice)	
2017	Amityville: The Awakening	Dr. Milton	
2017	El Camino Christmas	Sheriff Bob Fuller	
2022	Firestarter	Dr. Joseph Wanless	

=== Television ===
Year	Title	Role	Notes
1980	Soap	Man in laundromat	1 episode
1980	Me and Maxx	Dwayne	Episode: "Some Are Savers"
1980–1981	Lou Grant	DeGaetano / DeRopp / Fire Captain	3 episodes
1983	The Renegades	Captain Scanlon	6 episodes
1984	The A-Team	Mr. Carson	Episode: "The Battle of Bel Air"
1984	Blue Thunder	Bill Spradley	Episode: "Revenge in the Sky"
1984	Riptide	Merle Wilson	Episode: "The Orange Grove"
1985	Stir Crazy	Bo Carter	Episode: "The Ping Pong Caper"
1985	The Midnight Hour	Captain Warren Jensen	Television film
1985	The Best Times	Sam Ballard	Episode: "Volleyball"
1985	The Paper Chase		Episode: "Security"
1985	It's a Living	Senior Agent	Episode: "Hail to the Chef"
1985	Deadly Messages	Lieutenant Burton	Television film
1986	Stingray	Sgt. Edward Fiddler	Episode: "Sometimes You Gotta Sing the Blues"
1986	North and South	Col. Hiram Berdan	Miniseries
1986	Newhart	Chet	Episode: "Dick the Kid"
1986	The Christmas Gift	Jake Richards	Television film
1987	21 Jump Street	Spencer Phillips	2 episodes
1987	The New Adventures of Beans Baxter	Mr. Sue	5 episodes
1988	It's Garry Shandling's Show	Paul Bosgang	Episode: "Save the Planet"
1989	The Nightmare Years	Dr. Joseph Goebbels	Miniseries
1990	12:01 PM	Myron Castleman	Television short film
1990	The Famous Teddy Z		Episode: "Loyalty"
1992	Doorways	Special Agent Trager	Pilot
1993	Picket Fences	Barry Jenkins	Episode: "Be My Valentine"
1993	Big Wave Dave's	Jack Lord	6 episodes
1993–1996	Eek! The Cat	General Galapagos (voice)	11 episodes
1993–1997	The Terrible Thunderlizards	General Galapagos (voice)	Main role
1994	While Justice Sleeps	Leonard Rosenglass	Television film
1996	The X-Files	Agent Bill Patterson	Episode: "Grotesque"
1996	Star Trek: Deep Space Nine	Thrax	Episode: "Things Past"
1997	Men in Black: The Series	Agent H, Forbis (voice)	2 episodes
1997	Star Trek: Voyager	Annorax	Episode: "Year of Hell"
1998	The Magnificent Seven	Col. Emmett Anderson	Episode: "Ghosts of the Confederacy"
1998	A Bright Shining Lie	General Westmoreland	Television film
1998	Safety Patrol	Principal Tromp	Television film
1998–2006	That '70s Show	Red Forman	Main cast
1999	3rd Rock from the Sun	Jacob Solomon	Episode: "Dick Solomon of the Indiana Solomons"
1999	Todd McFarlane's Spawn	Robert Sullivan (voice)	Episode: "Seed of the Hellspawn"
2001	Gary & Mike	Officer Dick	
2001	Batman Beyond	Agent James Bennet (voice)	Episode: "Countdown"
2001	UC: Undercover	William Murphy	Episode: "Of Fathers and Sons"
2001	Justice League	Prosecutor (voice)	Episode: "In Blackest Night"
2001–2002	The Zeta Project	Agent James Bennet (voice)	14 episodes
2002	Fillmore!	Mr. Galser (voice)	Episode: "To Mar a Stall"
2002	Everybody Loves Raymond	Famous Baseball Player	
2004	Malcolm in the Middle	Principal Block	Episode: "Dirty Magazine"
2004–2006	The Grim Adventures of Billy & Mandy	Grim's Dad (voice)	2 episodes
2005	Robot Chicken	Various voices	2 episodes
2005	Super Robot Monkey Team Hyperforce Go!	Ciracus (voice)	Episode: "Girl Trouble"
2006	Handy Manny	Mr. Noodlander (voice)	Episode: "A Sticky Fix"
2006–2007	Squirrel Boy	Robert "Bob" Johnson (voice)	Main role
2006–2009	Medium	Agent Edward Cooper	3 episodes
2007	Psych	Captain Conners	Episode: "Forget Me Not"
2007	House MD	Dr. Obyedkov	Episode: "Half-Wit"
2007	Shorty McShorts' Shorts	Truant Officer Fabian (voice)	Episode: "Troy Ride"
2008–2009	Worst Week	Dick Clayton	16 episodes
2009	24	Senator Blaine Mayer	7 episodes
2009	Titan Maximum	Mercury General (voice)	2 episodes
2010	Neighbors from Hell	Don Killbride (voice)	Main role
2010	Childrens Hospital	Ben Hayflick	2 episodes
2011	Love Bites	Ed Strathmore	Episode: "How To..."
2011	CHAOS	H.J. Higgins	13 episodes
2011	Green Lantern: The Animated Series	Shyir Rev (voice)	Episode: "Beware My Power"
2012–2017	Regular Show	Gene (voice)	Recurring role
2012	Dan Vs.	Mechanic Mike (voice)	Episode: "Dan Vs. The Mechanic"
2012	Wedding Band	Hank Henderson	Episode: "I Don't Wanna Grow Up"
2012	Robot and Monster	Mr. Wheelie (voice)	4 episodes
2013	Body of Proof	Earl Brown	Episode: "Daddy Issues"
2013–2014	Beware the Batman	Lt. James Gordon (voice)	15 episodes
2014–2015	Resurrection	Henry Langston	Main role
2015	Maron	Tier 4	Episode: "The Node"
2015	Rick and Morty	General Nathan (voice)	Episode: "Get Schwifty"
2015	Tim & Eric's Bedtime Stories	Father Krang	Episode: "Tornado"
2015–2016	Agent Carter	Vernon Masters	Recurring role
2015–2018	Patriot	Leslie Claret	10 episodes
2016	TripTank	Coach (voice)	Episode: "The D.O.N.G."
2016–2017	Pig Goat Banana Cricket	Angry Old Raisin (voice)	Recurring role
2017–2020	The Ranch	Old Man Peterson	Recurring role (seasons 2-4)
2018	F Is for Family	Stan Chilson (voice)	Episode: "Summer Vacation"
2018	Future Man	Vise	Episode: "The Binx Ultimatum"
2019	Perpetual Grace, LTD	Uncle Dave	Recurring role (season 1)
2019	Suits	Ted Tucker	Episode: "Scenic Route"
2019	Perfect Harmony	Tinsley	Episode: "It's Electric"
2020	Star Trek: Lower Decks	Clar (voice)	Episode: "Veritas"
2021	Jupiter's Legacy	Old Man Miller	Episode: "All the Devils Are Here"
2021	Ultra City Smiths	Carpenter K. Smith (voice)	Recurring role
2022	The Dropout	David Boies	Recurring role
2023–2024	That '90s Show	Red Forman	Main cast, spin-off of That '70s Show
2024	Monsters at Work	Alistair Clawbottom (voice)	3 episodes
2025	The Simpsons	Mr. Hubley (voice)	Episode: "Guess Who's Coming to Skinner"

=== Video games ===
Year	Title	Role	Notes
2001	Fallout Tactics: Brotherhood of Steel	General Dekker	
