= My Life with Morrissey =

- Directed by: Andrew Overtoom
- Written by: Andrew Overtoom
- Produced by: Andrew Overtoom; Tricia Noble; Carolyn Suzuki
- Starring: Jackie Buscarino; Eduardo Acosta; Carla Jimenez; Ben Watson
- Cinematography: Andrew Overtoom
- Edited by: Lynn Hobson
- Music by: Nicolas Carr; Thomas Chase
- Production company: Twelve Angry Films
- Distributed by: MVD Music Video Distributors
- Release date: January 1, 2003
- Running time: 80 minutes
- Country: United States
- Language: English

My Life with Morrissey is a 2003 independent feature film written, produced and directed by Andrew Overtoom. The film won the Audience Award at the Black Point Film Festival in 2003.

== Plot ==
The film chronicles the adventures of an off-kilter career girl whose life goes berserk after she meets her idol, British rock star Morrissey, the former Smiths frontman, who remains a towering figure in the Britrock pantheon.

== Cast ==
- Jackie Buscarino as Jackie
- Eduardo Acosta as Ed
- Carla Jimenez as Virginia
- Ben Watson as Routly

== Reception ==
=== Critical response ===
The film received mixed reviews from critics and websites. Chris Garcia from FanBoy Planet.com wrote: "A charming turned spooky comedy that more bizarre and unpredictable." [sic?] Eric Campos from Film Threat.com enjoyed the film and wrote, "this is a funny goddamn movie!"

In a mostly positive review, critic Stephen Dalton of The Times wrote, "Feeling at times like an end-of-term school play, this gleeful examination of deranged fan worship is a sunny cousin to Martin Scorsese's King of Comedy", referring to the 1983 film The King of Comedy.

=== Awards ===
Year	Association	Category	Nominee	Result	Ref(s)
2003	Black Point Film Festival	Audience Award	Andrew Overtoom	Won	
2003	Black Point Film Festival	Best Actor	Jackie Buscarino	Won	
