= Jackie Buscarino =

American actress

- Born: Jacqueline Buscarino; Los Angeles, California, U.S.
- Occupations: Television producer; voice actor; writer
- Years active: 1999–present
- Notable work: Adventure Time; Gravity Falls; The Marvelous Misadventures of Flapjack; Steven Universe

Jacqueline "Jackie" Buscarino is an American voice actress, writer and television producer. She has contributed voice-over work to animated series such as The Marvelous Misadventures of Flapjack, Adventure Time and Gravity Falls. She was the producer of the Cartoon Network series Steven Universe and its sequel Steven Universe Future, where she also voiced Vidalia. Buscarino also starred as Jackie in the 2003 indie live action film My Life with Morrissey.

Alongside Justin Roiland and Ryan Ridley, she co-hosted The Grandma's Virginity Podcast. The first guest she invited on the podcast was Kent Osborne.

== Filmography ==
=== Television ===
Year	Title	Role
2001–2003	SpongeBob SquarePants	Production assistant
2002	Whatever Happened to... Robot Jones?	Production assistant
2002–2003	Dexter's Laboratory	Production assistant
2003–2004	The Powerpuff Girls	Production coordinator
2004	The Grim Adventures of Billy & Mandy	Story ("Just the Two of Pus")
2005–2006	Camp Lazlo	Production coordinator
2007–2008	Chowder	Production manager, songwriter and performer ("Tan Gai")
2008–2010	The Marvelous Misadventures of Flapjack	Story
2009	G.I. Joe: Resolute	Producer
2010–2011	Fish Hooks	Story
2012	Randy Cunningham: 9th Grade Ninja	Line producer
2013–2019	Steven Universe	Producer
2019–2020	Steven Universe Future	Producer
2021–2022	Victor and Valentino	Co-producer
2023	Fired on Mars	Supervising producer

=== Voice roles ===
Year	Title	Role	Notes
2008–2010	The Marvelous Misadventures of Flapjack	Sally Syrup, additional voices	
2010–2018	Adventure Time	Susan Strong, additional voices	
2011	China, IL	Additional voices	Episode: "Secret Society"
2012–2016	Gravity Falls	Pacifica Northwest	
2013–2014	Rick and Morty	Annie, Train Announcer, Criminal	2 episodes
2014	Uncle Grandpa	Jackie	Episode: "Not Funny"
2015–2018	Steven Universe	Vidalia	
2015	Welcome to My Life	Teacher	
2015–2016	Harvey Beaks	Additional voices	
