= Casey Alexander (cartoonist) =

American writer and director

- Born: Casey Raymond Alexander; September 12, 1975 (age 50); Nipomo, California, U.S.
- Occupations: Cartoonist, animator, storyboard artist, writer, director, producer
- Years active: 2004–present
- Known for: SpongeBob SquarePants; Uncle Grandpa; Unikitty! Victor and Valentino

Casey Raymond Alexander (born September 12, 1975) is an American cartoonist, animator, storyboard artist, writer, director, and producer known for his work on SpongeBob SquarePants, Uncle Grandpa, Billy Dilley's Super-Duper Subterranean Summer, and The SpongeBob SquarePants Movie.

== Career ==
Alexander started working at Nickelodeon on The SpongeBob SquarePants Movie as a layout artist. In 2005, he started working as a storyboard director and writer for SpongeBob SquarePants until 2012, when he left to work at Cartoon Network as a creative director on Uncle Grandpa. During his time on Uncle Grandpa, he wrote for the Cartoon Network short Jammers, and came back to Nickelodeon to write and direct for the Sanjay and Craig episode "Dream Rangers". After Uncle Grandpa ended, Alexander started working as a writer and storyboard director for Billy Dilley's Super-Duper Subterranean Summer, and a director for Unikitty!. He was a supervising producer on Victor and Valentino.

== Filmography ==
=== Film ===
Year	Title	Notes	Other notes
2004	The SpongeBob SquarePants Movie	Layout Artist	
2007	SpongeBob's Atlantis SquarePantis	Writer, Storyboard Director, Songwriter	Television movie
2025	Plankton: The Movie	Story Artist	

=== Television ===
Year	Title	Notes	Other notes
2005–15	SpongeBob SquarePants	Writer; Storyboard Director; Storyboard Artist (2008); Character Designer (2006–08); Prop Designer (2006–08); Clean-up Artist (2008); Songwriter (2007–10)	
2013–17	Uncle Grandpa	Writer/Storyboard Artist; Additional Storyboard Artist (2013); Storyboard Supervisor (2013–15); Story (2013–16); Creative Director (2014–17); Voice Director (2015–16); Supervising Director (2015–17)	
2014	Sanjay and Craig	Storyboard Director; Writer	One Episode: "Dream Rangers"
2015	Jammers	Writer; Storyboard Artist; Opening Titles Animator; Composer Additional Music	
2017	Billy Dilley's Super-Duper Subterranean Summer	Writer; Storyboard Artist; Storyboard Director	
2018	Unikitty!	Director; Storyboard Artist	
2019–22	Victor and Valentino	Story; Writer/Storyboard Artist; Supervising Producer	
2022	The Cuphead Show!	Storyboard Artist	
2023	Fired on Mars	Supervising Producer	
2025–present	The Patrick Star Show	Writer; Storyboard Artist	
