= Tom Yasumi =

American animator

Yoshito "Tom" Yasumi (born August 20, 1965 in Tokyo, Japan) is a Japanese-born American animator and director best known for his work on SpongeBob SquarePants as well as Rocko's Modern Life.

Yasumi was the animation director on SpongeBob SquarePants from the beginning of the series to season 12. He also worked as an animation director on one other Nicktoon, Sanjay and Craig.

== Filmography ==
=== Television ===
Year	Title	Career	Notes
1989	ABC Weekend Specials	Animator/Background Painter/Production Assistant	Episode: "P.J. Funnybunny"
1991	The Legend of Prince Valiant	Assistant Animator	Episode: "The Dream"
1992–94	Rugrats	Design And Background/Sheet Timer/Background Layout Artist/Background Designer/Character Designer/Animation Timer	46 episodes
1995–96	Rocko's Modern Life	Animation Timer	30 episodes
1997–99	The Angry Beavers	Animation Timer	10 episodes
1999–2021	SpongeBob SquarePants	Animation Director/Animation Timer/Sheet Timer/Scene Timer	180 episodes
1999	Oh Yeah! Cartoons	Director	Episode: "Herb"
2005	Catscratch	Sheet Timer	2 episodes
2013	Sanjay and Craig	Animation Director	10 episodes
2014	Clarence	Sheet Timer	Episode: "Bedside Manners"
2020–2021	Animaniacs	Animation Timing/Animation Timer	6 episodes
2021	The Great North	Animation Timing/Animation Timer	19 episodes
2022	Central Park	Animation Timing/Animation Timer	7 episodes
2023	HouseBroken	Timing director	Episode: "Who's the Cat-Chelorette?"
2024	Grimsburg	Timing director	5 episodes
2026	Family Guy	Animation timer	2 episodes

=== Film ===
Year	Title	Career	Notes
2004	The SpongeBob SquarePants Movie	Animation Timing Director	Live-Action Animated Comedy Film
2009	Square Roots: The Story of SpongeBob SquarePants	Archive Footage	Documentary Film
2009	SpongeBob's Truth or Square	Animation Director	10th Anniversary special
2011	Legends of Bikini Bottom	Animation director	Anthology film
2015	The SpongeBob Movie: Sponge Out of Water	Animation Director	Live-Action Animated Comedy Film
2019	SpongeBob's Big Birthday Blowout	Animation Director	20th Anniversary special

=== Shorts ===
Year	Title	Career	Notes
1985	The Side View	Director/Producer/Writer/Animator/Composer/Director of Photography/Editor	
2005	SpongeBob SquarePants 4-D	Director	
2019	Harold & Herbert in Dumpster Diving	Additional Sheet Timer	
