= Andrew Overtoom =

American film director

- Born: John Andrew Overtoom; Edison, New Jersey, U.S.
- Education: Vancouver Film School; Fordham University
- Occupations: Animation director, writer, photographer, cinematographer
- Years active: 1993–present
- Known for: SpongeBob SquarePants; Clarence; My Life with Morrissey; All in the Bunker; Billy Dilley's Super-Duper Subterranean Summer

John Andrew Overtoom is an American animation director, writer, photographer, and cinematographer. Recent credits include Nickelodeon's The Patrick Star Show as well as the animated feature film The SpongeBob Movie: Sponge on the Run, where he served as CG animation director and head of character animation. He was supervising animation director on the Cartoon Network series Clarence, as well as Disney XD's animated television series Billy Dilley's Super-Duper Subterranean Summer where he was a writer and animation supervisor. In 1999, after two years as an animation timer on The Angry Beavers, Overtoom was hired as an animation director on the Nickelodeon animated television series SpongeBob SquarePants, for which he was nominated for Emmy Awards in 2004, 2007 and 2011. My Life with Morrissey is Overtoom's first award-winning live action feature as a writer/director/cinematographer and is distributed by MVD. Other credits include Family Guy and American Dad for Fox TV, and Phineas and Ferb and Dave the Barbarian for Disney.

== Career ==
After graduating, Overtoom attended Pasadena's yearly Animation Celebration, where his feature film No Parachute caught the attention of producer Mike Girard. Girard hired Overtoom onto Nickelodeon's The Angry Beavers, where he worked as an animation timer.

Overtoom moved as an animation director over to another Nickelodeon series, SpongeBob SquarePants, since the show had begun in 1999. Laura Fries of Variety praised his work on the 2002 special "SpongeBob's House Party": "Overtoom has created a very stylistic and vivid animated world that smacks of retro pastiche."

In August 2001, Overtoom began the production of his first feature film My Life with Morrissey, which he wrote, directed and photographed. The film premiered in 2003. Critic Stephen Dalton of The Times, in a positive review, wrote that "[B]ehind its high-camp, irreverent tone, Overtoom's film is clearly a twisted tribute." The film won the Audience Award at the 2003 Black Point Film Festival in Wisconsin.

In 2009, Overtoom and Vancouver Film School classmates Trent Noble and Yann Trembley animated the CG short film All in the Bunker. The offbeat comedy, written and directed by Overtoom, is a satire of modern-day sitcom culture and network television and stars Kurtwood Smith, Cheryl Hines and Don Novello.

Overtoom has served as a timing director on episodes of the Fox and Disney Channel animated series Family Guy and Phineas and Ferb, and a sheet timer for The Mighty B!. He served as the supervising animation director on the Cartoon Network series Clarence and the Disney XD animated series Billy Dilley's Super-Duper Subterranean Summer. In early 2018, Overtoom returned to SpongeBob SquarePants to work on season 12 as an animation director. He was subsequently hired as CG Animation Director at Paramount Pictures for the first all CG SpongeBob feature The SpongeBob Movie: Sponge on the Run, where he created a CG animation style constructed from commonly used techniques of 2D and stop-motion animation, relying heavily on his past work on SpongeBob and also Nick Park's Oscar winning Wallace and Gromit short films The Wrong Trousers and A Close Shave. Overtoom was then promoted to Head of Character Animation (HOCA) by Paramount in the summer of 2018.

In 2019, he headed to Montreal to continue production on the new SpongeBob feature film at Mikros Image, continuing his duties as CG Animation Director and Head of Character Animation (HOCA). The SpongeBob feature released in theaters in Canada on August 14, 2020.

== Personal life ==
Overtoom graduated from the Vancouver Film School's Classical Animation program, and also previously earned a bachelor's degree in history at Fordham University CLC.

== Filmography ==
=== Television ===
Year	Show	Role	Notes
1999	The Angry Beavers	Animation timer	
1999	Oh Yeah! Cartoons	Director	
1999–2012, 2018–2024	SpongeBob SquarePants	Animation director, Sheet timer, Footage provider, Songwriter	
2004	Dave the Barbarian	Timing director	
2005	Family Guy	Animation timer	
2006–2007	The Emperor's New School	Timing director	
2007	Squirrel Boy	Sheet timer	
2007	Ni Hao, Kai-Lan	Sheet timer	
2007–2008	Random! Cartoons	Director, Sheet timer	
2008–2009	The Mighty B!	Sheet timer	
2012–2013	Phineas and Ferb	Animation timer/Timing director	
2013–2014	Adventure Time	Sheet timer	
2014–2015	Clarence	Supervising Animation Director, Title Art and Photography, Stop Motion Animation, Live Action Sequences	
2016–2018	Pickle and Peanut	Director	
2017	Billy Dilley's Super-Duper Subterranean Summer	Supervising Timing Director, writer, Storyboard Artist, Dialogue director	
2017	Spider-Man	Timing director	
2021–2022	The Patrick Star Show	Animation director	

=== Film ===
Year	Film	Role	Notes
2001	Constant Payne	Animation director	Animated short film
2003	My Life with Morrissey	Director; Writer; Producer; Music supervisor Cinematographer	Independent–feature film
2003	Real Life With Morrissey	Director; Writer; Producer; Editor; Cinematographer	Documentary film
2004	The SpongeBob SquarePants Movie	Animation timing director	Live-Action Animated Comedy Film
2005	Stewie Griffin: The Untold Story	Animation timer	Direct-to-video
2005	The Proud Family Movie	Timing director	
2005	SpongeBob's The Endless Summer	Animation director	Animated short film
2007	SpongeBob's Atlantis SquarePantis	Animation director	Television movie
2009	All in the Bunker	Director; Writer; Producer; Animator; Cinematographer	Animated short film
2009	SpongeBob's Truth or Square	Animation director	10th Anniversary special
2011	Legends of Bikini Bottom	Animation director	Anthology film
2011	Sandy's Vacation in Ruins	Animation director	Animated short film
2015	Jammers	Animatic director	Animated short film
2020	The SpongeBob Movie: Sponge on the Run	Head of character animation	Live-Action Animated Comedy Film
2023	SpongeBob SquarePants Presents The Tidal Zone	Animation director	Anthology film
2024	SpongeBob's Kreepaway Kamp	Animation director	25th Anniversary special
