= List of most watched premieres on Nickelodeon =

This is a list of the most watched premieres on Nickelodeon. It includes movies, TV episodes, special events (i.e. the Nickelodeon Kids' Choice Awards) and crossover events with over 6 million viewers. Reruns are not included.

Viewership data is incomplete or missing for many premieres, especially for premieres from the 1990s and earlier. The below list uses rankings to show the relative position of each documented premiere on the list itself. The fact that a premiere is assigned a certain rank on this list does not mean the premiere was that most viewed premiere of all time (i.e. the 15th entry on this list is not necessarily the 15th most viewed premiere of all time).

Rank	Episode	Series	Original air date	Viewers (in millions)
1	"All Growed Up"	Rugrats	July 21, 2001	11.913
2	"iSaved Your Life"	iCarly	January 18, 2010	11.164
3	"iQuit iCarly"	iCarly	December 5, 2009	8.848
4	"Fairly OddBaby"	The Fairly OddParents	February 18, 2008	8.809
5	"Atlantis SquarePantis"	SpongeBob SquarePants	November 12, 2007	8.757
6	"Dunces and Dragons"	SpongeBob SquarePants	February 20, 2006	8.560
7	Merry Christmas, Drake & Josh	Drake & Josh	December 5, 2008	8.095
8	"Chuckie's Duckling/A Dog's Life"	Rugrats	January 18, 1999	7.960
9	"Have You Seen This Snail?"	SpongeBob SquarePants	November 11, 2005	7.934
10	"iFight Shelby Marx"	iCarly	August 8, 2009	7.866
11	"iGot a Hot Room"	iCarly	July 30, 2010	7.740
12	"Still Babies After All These Years"	Rugrats	July 21, 2001	7.697
13	2009 Kids' Choice Awards	Nickelodeon Kids' Choice Awards	March 28, 2009	7.675
14	"What Ever Happened to SpongeBob?"	SpongeBob SquarePants	October 13, 2008	7.666
15	"Truth or Square"	SpongeBob SquarePants	November 6, 2009	7.658
16	2010 Kids' Choice Awards	Nickelodeon Kids' Choice Awards	March 27, 2010	7.639
17	"The Sponge Who Could Fly"	SpongeBob SquarePants	March 21, 2003	7.635
18	"iGo to Japan"	iCarly	November 8, 2008	7.599
19	FRED: The Movie	Nick Original Movie	September 18, 2010	7.597
20	"iThink They Kissed"	iCarly	September 12, 2009	7.564
21	"iPsycho"	iCarly	June 4, 2010	7.518
22	2008 Kids' Choice Awards	Nickelodeon Kids' Choice Awards	March 29, 2008	7.449
23	"iOMG"	iCarly	April 9, 2011	7.355
24	"iParty with Victorious"	Nick Original Movie	June 11, 2011	7.316
25	The SpongeBob SquarePants Movie	Nick Original Movie	November 10, 2006	7.307
26	2011 Kids' Choice Awards	Nickelodeon Kids' Choice Awards	April 2, 2011	7.287
27	"Goodbye Zoey?"	Zoey 101	January 4, 2008	7.276
28	"Big Time School of Rocque"	Big Time Rush	January 18, 2010	6.773
29	"iDo"	iCarly	October 11, 2010	6.697
30	"Best Day Ever"	SpongeBob SquarePants	November 10, 2006	6.658
31	"Trenchbillies"	SpongeBob SquarePants	January 29, 2011	6.553
32	"iDate a Bad Boy"	iCarly	May 9, 2009	6.472
33	"Launchtime"/"Haunted Habitat"	The Penguins of Madagascar	March 28, 2009	6.439
34	"iGoodbye"	iCarly	November 23, 2012	6.430
35	"Party Pooper Pants"	SpongeBob SquarePants	May 17, 2002	6.321
36	"iLook Alike"	iCarly	March 7, 2009	6.299
37	2012 Kids' Choice Awards	Nickelodeon Kids' Choice Awards	March 31, 2012	6.162
38	"Beggin' on Your Knees"	Victorious	April 2, 2011	6.152
39	"Pest of the West"	SpongeBob SquarePants	April 11, 2008	6.141
40	2007 Kids' Choice Awards	Nickelodeon Kids' Choice Awards	March 31, 2007	6.115
41	"The Great Patty Caper"	SpongeBob SquarePants	November 11, 2010	6.102
42	"The Monster Who Came to Bikini Bottom"/"Welcome to the Bikini Bottom Triangle"	SpongeBob SquarePants	January 28, 2011	6.054
43	"Trading Places"	Zoey 101	January 27, 2008	6.023
44	"Sponge-Cano!"/"The Main Drain"	SpongeBob SquarePants	January 28, 2011	6.004
