= List of Welcome to the Wayne episodes =

Welcome to the Wayne is an animated television series created by Billy Lopez. It premiered on July 24, 2017 on Nickelodeon. Welcome to the Wayne originated as an online web series, that was originally released on Nick.com from November 14 to December 26, 2014.

On October 15, 2018, the show moved to the sister network Nicktoons.

During the course of the series, 30 episodes of Welcome to the Wayne aired over two seasons.

== Series overview ==
Season	Episodes		Originally released		
Season	Episodes		First released	Last released	Network
Web series	6		November 14, 2014	December 26, 2014	Nick.com
1	20	9	July 24, 2017	September 21, 2017	Nickelodeon
1	20	11	October 15, 2018	October 26, 2018	Nicktoons
2	10		May 3, 2019	May 31, 2019	Nicktoons

== Episodes ==
=== Web series (2014) ===
No.	Title	Directed by	Written by	Storyboard by	Original release date
1	"Chapter 1"	Paul Hunt	Billy Lopez	Blair Kitchen, Chris Land, and Dave Thomas	November 14, 2014
Just one week after moving to New York City, 10 year old Ansi is making his way home from school to his new apartment in the Wayne when he runs into Olly Timbers, a red-haired dynamo who drags Ansi on an adventure that involves spies, laser blasters, and, worst of all, physical contact.
2	"Chapter 2"	Paul Hunt	Billy Lopez	Blair Kitchen, Chris Land, and Dave Thomas	November 21, 2014
Ansi is introduced to Olly’s younger sister Saraline (the more sophisticated Timbers) just before dodging Flowershirt, Masterson and the Spy in order to get up to his apartment and see the M.O.N.S.T.E.R. under his bed.
3	"Chapter 3"	Paul Hunt	Billy Lopez	Blair Kitchen, Chris Land, and Dave Thomas	November 28, 2014
After just nearly escaping Masterson (by jumping out of a hallway window) the boys find themselves scaling the outside of the Wayne, dodging a mechanical pigeon, and slowly but surely getting the suitcase up to Jonah Bishop’s apartment.
4	"Chapter 4"	Paul Hunt	Billy Lopez	Blair Kitchen, Chris Land, and Dave Thomas	December 12, 2014
Just after landing safely inside the halls of the Wayne, the boys are cornered by Flowershirt, forcing Olly to call Saraline for backup. Enter Leif Bornewell III, on a scooter built for three.
5	"Chapter 5"	Paul Hunt	Billy Lopez	Blair Kitchen, Chris Land, and Dave Thomas	December 19, 2014
After a small falling-out over the briefcase, Ansi goes home to find Olly built him a Gleeco paradise, which he explores until Saraline’s voice comes over Olly’s Beamstar (Ansi still has it!) warning him that the Spy is waiting for him on the roof!
6	"Chapter 6"	Paul Hunt	Billy Lopez	Blair Kitchen, Chris Land, and Dave Thomas	December 26, 2014
Olly, Ansi, Saraline and Leif take on the Spy from 8-I, Flowershirt, and Masterson, while a tied-up Jonah Bishop…wait, why didn’t anyone untie him?

=== Season 1 (2017–18) ===
No.	Title	Directed by	Written by	Storyboard by	Original release date	Prod. code	U.S. viewers (millions)
Nickelodeon
1	"Rise and Shine Sleepyhead"	Tahir Rana	Billy Lopez	Chris Land	July 24, 2017	101	1.17
Ansi, a new resident of the Wayne, must work with siblings Olly and Saraline to stop a rampaging threat deep within their home.: This episode was first released online at Nick.com on June 19, 2017. Also on iTunes as a free Pre-air episode on June 19, 2017 before airing on Nickelodeon on July 24, 2017, (USA).
2	"Like a Happy, Happy Bird"	Tahir Rana	James Best and Billy Lopez	Sasha McIntyre	July 25, 2017	102	1.09
With Ansi on board, Team Timbers follow a mysterious figure into the Wayne's secret library; Ansi tries to protect his new friend and budding crush Julia from a terrifying monster.
3	"Mail Those Cards, Boys!"	Tahir Rana	James Best, Craig Carlisle, Jonathan Greenberg, Billy Lopez, and Michael Pecoriello	Chris Land and Blayne Burnside	July 26, 2017	103	1.12
After a robotic pigeon steals their mysterious post cards, Team Timbers and Leif must fight their way through the Wayne Postal Service to get them back.
4	"Today Was Wassome"	Tahir Rana	Susan Kim, Billy Lopez, and Michael Pecoriello	Sasha McIntyre	July 27, 2017	104	1.27
Tired of being bossed around, Ansi joins forces with Wendell Wasserman, a spoon-wielding vampire hunter, to track down the Wayne's last remaining vampire.
5	"Some Kind of Tap-Dancing, Beekeeping Whaler"	Tahir Rana	Craig Carlisle, Billy Lopez, and Michael Pecoriello	Caroline Hung	July 28, 2017	105	1.11
As Olly helps his new neighbor regain his memory, Ansi is convinced that his best friend is in mortal danger.
6	"Like No Other Market on Earth"	Tahir Rana	Susan Kim, Billy Lopez, and Michael Pecoriello	Michelle Ku and Blair Kitchen	September 18, 2017	106	1.21
On the search for a mysterious rainbow gas, Team Timbers ends up in the Wayne's supernatural supermarket trailed by a dangerous creature determined to break up their friendship forever.
7	"Beeping the Binklemobile"	Tahir Rana	Billy Lopez, Michael Pecoriello, and Kevin Seccia	Chris Land and Jason Armstrong	September 19, 2017	107	1.18
When the biggest Gleeco competition of the year comes to the Wayne, Ansi meets his biggest competition -- Dennis O'Bannon; but when Ansi's creation comes to life, Team Timbers has to take down the unstoppable Gleeco Man.
8	"Spacefish"	Tahir Rana	Craig Carlisle, Susan Kim, Billy Lopez, and Michael Pecoriello	Michelle Ku	September 20, 2017	108	1.17
When Olly, Ansi, and Andrei have a boys' bonding night roof camping they try to conjure a ghost - but something even more terrifying appears.
9	"A Pair of Normas"	Tahir Rana	James Best, Susan Kim, Billy Lopez, and Michael Pecoriello	Caroline Hung	September 21, 2017	109	1.21
Team Timbers tries to stop reality TV show hosts from revealing the secrets of the Wayne and exposing themselves and the world to danger.
Nicktoons
10	"It's the Mid-Season Finale"	Tahir Rana	Susan Kim, Billy Lopez, and Michael Pecoriello	Chris Land	October 15, 2018 (Note: This episode first aired in Russia and Germany on December 22, 2017.)	110	0.06
A storm of rainbow gas threatens to destroy the Wayne unless Team Timbers can stop it in time.
11	"Hit It, Toofus!"	Tahir Rana	Jordan Gershowitz, Billy Lopez, Michael Pecoriello, and Kevin Seccia	Rachel Peters	October 16, 2018 (Note: This episode first aired in Russia and Germany on December 25, 2017.)	111	N/A
Ansi, Olly, and Saraline must attend a dinner and game night with their parents while trying to protect Andrei from The Spy From Apartment 8-I.
12	"Wall-to-Wall Ping-Pong Ball"	Tahir Rana	Jordan Gershowitz, Billy Lopez, and Michael Pecoriello	Michelle Ku and Bram Cayne	October 17, 2018 (Note: This episode first aired in Russia and Germany on December 26, 2017.)	112	N/A
When Andrei finds a mysterious book about vampires, Team Timbers takes him to the Stanza to learn more about his past. But when they are attacked by a ninja, they suspect that Andrei could be evil.
13	"Swap Shop Hop & Bop"	Tahir Rana	Billy Lopez, Zach Paez, and Michael Pecoriello	Caroline Hung	October 18, 2018 (Note: This episode first aired in Russia and Germany on December 27, 2017.)	113	N/A
At the annual Wayne flea market, Ansi has to release his childhood toy while Olly is in search of the ultimate collection and Andrei's vintage clothing comes to life through a mysterious object
14	"8:08:08"	Tahir Rana	James Best, Lexi St. John, Liza St. John, Susan Kim, Billy Lopez, Christian Marsh Reiman, and Michael Pecoriello	Michelle Ku	October 19, 2018 (Note: This episode first aired in Russia and Germany on December 28, 2017.)	114	N/A
Saraline's 8th birthday turns into a late night adventure through the Wayne with all of their friends to investigate a strange clue from Tony Stanza.
15	"Flutch"	Tahir Rana	Billy Lopez, Michael Pecoriello, and Kevin Seccia	Caroline Hung	October 22, 2018 (Note: This episode first aired in Russia and Germany on December 29, 2017.)	115	N/A
Ansi gets captured by a talking pipe and taken down to a mysterious kingdom below the Wayne, ruled by a washing machine pharaoh.
16	"What's For Linner?"	Tahir Rana	Susan Kim, Billy Lopez, Christian Marsh Reiman, and Michael Pecoriello	Chris Land	October 23, 2018 (Note: This episode first aired in Russia and Germany on January 1, 2018.)	116	0.19
Team Timbers follows a magical paper butterfly into a fantastical origami world created Katherine-Alice, a girl without a voice, who needs their help.
17	"Leave the Funny, Find the Bunny"	Tahir Rana	Billy Lopez, Zach Paez, and Michael Pecoriello	Bram Cayne	October 24, 2018 (Note: This episode first aired in Russia and Germany on January 2, 2018.)	117	N/A
At the Wayne Talent Show, Olly and Ansi put on a magic act and encounter a powerful rabbit bent on revenge.
18	"Gimble in the Wabe"	Tahir Rana	Craig Carlisle, Billy Lopez, and Michael Pecoriello	Caroline Hung and Cilbur Rocha	October 25, 2018 (Note: This episode first aired in Russia and Germany on January 3, 2018.)	118	N/A
The Wayne loses power on the hottest day of the year, forcing Team Timbers to search for the fabled swimming pool.
19	"Keep an Eye on the Nose"	Tahir Rana	Billy Lopez, Zach Paez, and Michael Pecoriello	Bram Cayne and Caroline Hung	October 26, 2018 (Note: This episode first aired in Russia and Germany on January 4, 2018.)	119	N/A
Saraline investigates a mysterious walking nose that's loose in the Wayne; Olly is convinced Julia is hiding a major secret.
20	"So This Is Glamsterdam"	Tahir Rana	Craig Carlisle, Billy Lopez, and Michael Pecoriello	Caroline Hung and Chris Land	October 26, 2018 (Note: This episode first aired in Russia and Germany on January 5, 2018.)	120	N/A
With the Spy close to opening the Gates of Glamsterdam, Team Timbers prepares for an all out battle for the Wayne.

=== Season 2 (2019) ===
No. overall	No. in season	Title	Directed by	Written by	Storyboard by	Original release date	Prod. code
21	1	"We're Gonna Need a Bigger Cup"	Tahir Rana	Adam Cohen and Michael Pecoriello	Bram Cayne and Will Jeyasingham	May 3, 2019	201
Tony Stanza insists the kids take a break without their tech just when a new WP called Eraser Face appears and tries to erase the Wayne.
22	2	"Welcome to the Wassermans"	Tahir Rana	Stacey Greenberger and Michael Pecoriello	Matt Wilson	May 3, 2019	202
A sleepover at Wendell's turns into a mission to get a mysterious jewel from his teenage sister and a battle with a werewolf.
23	3	"An Olly-Day Miracle!"	Tahir Rana	Jeffrey Sayers and Michael Pecoriello	Bram Cayne	May 10, 2019	203
Olly spends his made-up holiday, Olly Day, with the Arcsine to try and show her how to have fun.
24	4	"That's Squidjit Bowling"	Tahir Rana	Jacob Fleisher, Billy Lopez, and Michael Pecoriello	Matt Wilson	May 10, 2019	204
When Dennis is unable to compete in the Squidjit Bowling Championship, Ansi and John Keats step in to play for him against the undefeated HuMannequins.
25	5	"We're the Wayniacs"	Tahir Rana	Adam Cohen and Michael Pecoriello	Aisha Ghali and Firas Momani	May 17, 2019	205
A heavy metal Wayne phenomenon called C.C. Scratch attempts to turn everyone into musical instruments, so Olly, Ansi and Katherine Alice form a rock band to defeat it.
26	6	"Curious Brains of the Wayne"	Tahir Rana	Jeffrey Sayers and Michael Pecoriello	Will Jeyasingham	May 17, 2019	206
While looking for something to present at the annual Wayne science fair, Olly accidentally transforms himself into a fly. While he is in insect form, he must try to prevent the Spy from using Saraline's project to steal the Arcsine's powers.
27	7	"Wiles Styles You Over"	Tahir Rana	Erica Ottenberg and Michael Pecoriello	Bram Cayne and Caroline Hung	May 24, 2019	207
Julia gives Olly, Ansi and Saraline makeovers that change parts of their personalities as well as their looks. Olly becomes a genius, Ansi becomes super strong, and Saraline becomes a popular star on social media.
28	8	"The Best Buddy I Never Had"	Tahir Rana	Jeffrey Sayers and Michael Pecoriello	Aisha Ghali	May 24, 2019	208
Team Timbers discovers a book of the Wayne's history that takes them back in time to when Olly was a baby, but troubles arise when Olly fails to follow the book's rules leaving him in danger of losing his sister forever.
29	9	"Some Sort of Bad Luck Curse"	Tahir Rana	Bob Mittenthal and Michael Pecoriello	Caroline Hung and Will Jeyasingham	May 31, 2019	209
A trap by Prismal causes Annacille to rapidly age into an old woman and Saraline tries to find a cure.
30	10	"Whoever Controls the Wayne, Controls the World"	Tahir Rana	Adam Cohen and Michael Pecoriello	Matthew Wilson	May 31, 2019	210
With Prismal in control and darkness spreading through the Wayne, everything Team Timbers has gone through has prepared them for this moment, to save the Wayne and the world.
