= SpongeBob SquarePants season 4 =

Season of television series

SpongeBob SquarePants
- Season 4
- DVD cover
- Showrunner: Paul Tibbitt
- Starring: Tom Kenny; Bill Fagerbakke; Rodger Bumpass; Clancy Brown; Mr. Lawrence; Jill Talley; Carolyn Lawrence; Mary Jo Catlett; Lori Alan
- No. of episodes: 20 (38 segments)

Release
- Original network: Nickelodeon
- Original release: May 6, 2005 – July 24, 2007

Season chronology
- ← Previous; Season 3 Next → Season 5

The fourth season of the American animated television series SpongeBob SquarePants, created by former marine biologist and animator Stephen Hillenburg, aired on Nickelodeon from May 6, 2005, to July 24, 2007, and contained 20 half-hour episodes. The series chronicles the adventures of the title character and his various friends in the fictional underwater city of Bikini Bottom. The season was executive produced by series creator Hillenburg, while writer Paul Tibbitt acted as the supervising producer and showrunner. Starting with this season, Hillenburg, who left his role as showrunner following production on the first film, took on a smaller advisory role, where the production crew would receive feedback from him during production of episodes.

The show itself received several recognitions, including the three Kids' Choice Awards for Favorite Cartoon from 2005 to 2007. "Fear of a Krabby Patty" and "Shell of a Man" were nominated at the 57th Primetime Emmy Awards for Outstanding Animated Program (for Programming Less Than One Hour). It also received a nomination for "Bummer Vacation" and "Wigstruck" at the 59th Primetime Emmy Awards for the same category.

Several compilation DVDs that contained episodes from the season were released. The SpongeBob SquarePants: Season 4, Volume 1 and 2 DVDs were released in Region 1 on September 12, 2006, and January 9, 2007, respectively, while the complete set was released in Region 2 on November 3, 2008, and Region 4 on November 7, 2008. The second volume was released in Region 1 before several episodes aired in the United States. On November 13, 2012, The Complete Fourth Season DVD was released in Region 1.

== Production ==
The season is the first without Stephen Hillenburg as a showrunner, while retaining his role as executive producer. Hillenburg resigned as showrunner in 2004 following production on The SpongeBob SquarePants Movie. Hillenburg wanted to end the series "so the show wouldn't jump the shark", citing concerns among Nickelodeon executives that the show "had peaked" when the movie was being produced, but Nickelodeon could not afford to end the show. Hillenburg appointed Paul Tibbitt, who previously served as a writer, director, and storyboard artist of the show as showrunner following his departure. Hillenburg considered Tibbitt one of his favorite members of the show's crew, and "totally trusted him". Tibbitt, who also functioned as an executive producer, helmed the showrunner position until October 2015 when Vincent Waller and Marc Ceccarelli took his position. Hillenburg no longer wrote or directly ran the show on a day-to-day basis, but reviewed each episode and delivered suggestions. He said, "I figure when I'm pretty old I can still paint. I don't know about running shows."

In November 2004, Tom Kenny, Bill Fagerbakke, and the rest of the crew confirmed that they had completed four new episodes for broadcast on Nickelodeon in early 2005, and planned to finish about 20 total for the then-fourth season. In particular, Kenny said, "Kids were happy watching them for the 3,000th time. It was the parents who've been busting my chops for new episodes." He remarked that it would be "the same show, the same sponge". On May 6, 2005, the season premiered with the episodes "Fear of a Krabby Patty" and "Shell of a Man". "Fear of a Krabby Patty" was the first episode to be broadcast after the show's intermission. It was written by C.H. Greenblatt and Paul Tibbitt, while Alan Smart served as animation director, it was also the final episode that Greenblatt worked on before he left the series.

Animation was handled overseas in South Korea at Rough Draft Studios. Animation directors credited with episodes in the fourth season included Larry Leichliter, Andrew Overtoom, Smart, and Tom Yasumi. (Note: Information is taken from the opening credits of each episode.) Episodes were written by a team of writers, which consisted of Casey Alexander, Steven Banks, Mike Bell, Luke Brookshier, Nate Cash, Zeus Cervas, Greenblatt, Tom King, Tim Hill, Kyle McCulloch, Dani Michaeli, Chris Mitchell, Mike Mitchell, Aaron Springer, Tibbitt, Vincent Waller, Tuck Tucker, and Erik Wiese. The storyboard directors for this season were Alexander, Bell, Brookshier, Cash, Cervas, Greenblatt, King, Chris Mitchell, Springer, Tuck Tucker, Brad Vandergrift, Waller, and Wiese.

== Cast ==
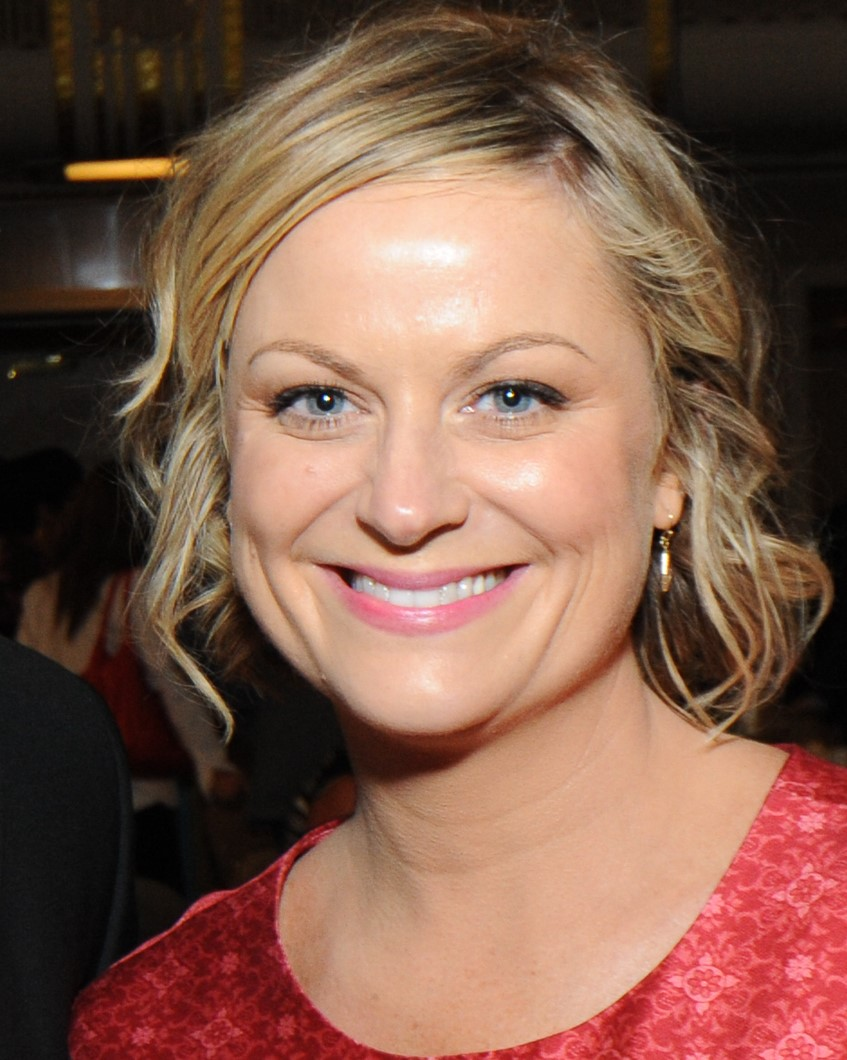
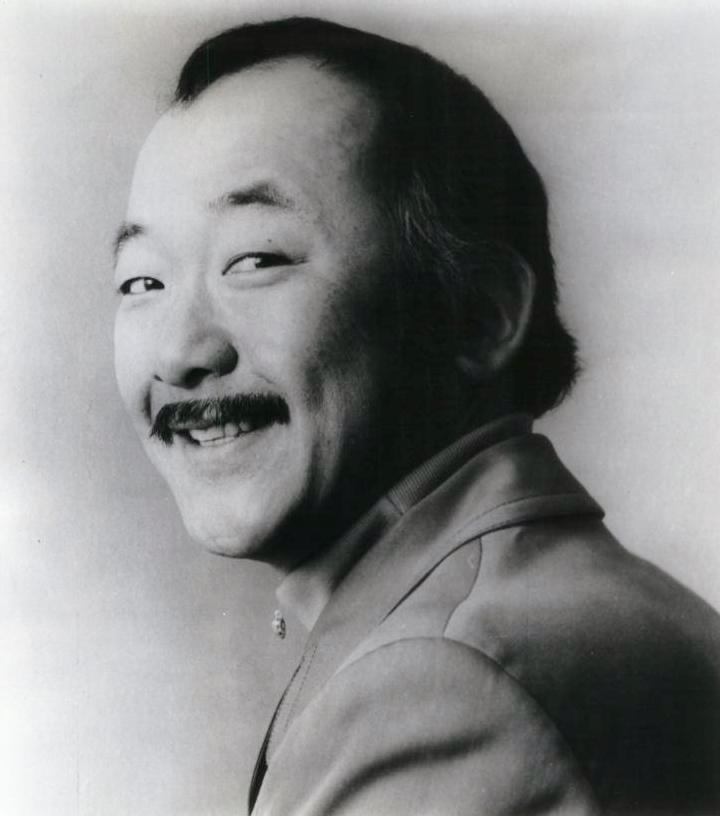
Amy Poehler (left) guest starred in the episode "Have You Seen This Snail?". Pat Morita voiced Master Udon in "Karate Island"; Morita died before the episode aired, and the program was dedicated to his memory

The fourth season featured Tom Kenny as the voice of the title character SpongeBob SquarePants and his pet snail Gary. SpongeBob's best friend, a starfish named Patrick Star, was voiced by Bill Fagerbakke, while Rodger Bumpass played the voice of Squidward Tentacles, an arrogant and ill-tempered octopus. Other members of the cast were Clancy Brown as Mr. Krabs, a miserly crab obsessed with money who is SpongeBob's boss at the Krusty Krab; Mr. Lawrence as Plankton, a small green copepod and Mr. Krabs' business rival; Jill Talley as Karen, Plankton's sentient computer sidekick; Carolyn Lawrence as Sandy Cheeks, a squirrel from Texas; Mary Jo Catlett as Mrs. Puff, SpongeBob's boating school teacher; and Lori Alan as Pearl, a teenage whale who is Mr. Krabs' daughter.

In addition to the regular cast members, episodes feature guest voices from a range of professions, including actors, musicians, and artists. For instance, in the episode "Have You Seen This Snail?", American comedian and actress Amy Poehler guest starred as the voice of Grandma, a sweet old woman who adopted Gary after he ran away. Musician Stew also appeared as a voice, performing the song "Gary, Come Home". Show writer C.H. Greenblatt made an appearance in the episode "Selling Out" as Carl. Ernest Borgnine and Tim Conway returned in the episode "Mermaid Man and Barnacle Boy VI: The Motion Picture", reprising their roles as Mermaid Man and Barnacle Boy, respectively. Brian Doyle-Murray reprised his role as the Flying Dutchman for "Ghost Host". In "Mrs. Puff, You're Fired", English actor Robin Sachs voiced Sergeant Sam Roderick, a driving instructor who took over Mrs. Puff in teaching SpongeBob. The Young Ones stars Christopher Ryan, Nigel Planer and Rik Mayall appeared in the episode "Chimps Ahoy" as Sandy's bosses—Professor Percy, Dr. Marmalade and Lord Reginald, respectively. In the entry "Karate Island", Happy Days and The Karate Kid star Pat Morita guest starred in a post-humorous role as Master Udon, a scammer who kidnaps SpongeBob to make him buy real estate. Morita died on November 24, 2005, from kidney failure at his home in Las Vegas, Nevada, and the May 2006 episode was dedicated to Morita's memory.

== Reception ==
The season was critically acclaimed by media critics and fans. Paul Mavis of DVD Talk gave both of the season's volumes 4½ stars. The episodes "Fear of a Krabby Patty" and "Shell of a Man" were nominated at the 57th Primetime Emmy Awards for Outstanding Animated Program (for Programming Less Than One Hour), but lost to South Park's "Best Friends Forever". The show was also nominated at the 59th Primetime Emmy Awards for the same category for the episodes "Bummer Vacation" and "Wigstruck". At the 33rd Annie Awards, C.H. Greenblatt, Paul Tibbitt, Mike Bell and Tim Hill won for Best Writing in an Animated Television Production for the episode "Fear of a Krabby Patty". "Fear of a Krabby Patty" won for a Special Award at the 2005 Annecy International Animated Film Festival. At the 2006 Golden Reel Awards, the episode "Have You Seen This Snail?" was nominated for Best Sound Editing in Television: Animated. The show itself received several recognitions, including the three Kids' Choice Awards for Favorite Cartoon from 2005 to 2007. It also received a nomination at the 21st TCA Awards for Outstanding Achievement in Children's Programming, but lost to Degrassi: The Next Generation, and at the 23rd TCA Awards for the same category. However, the series did not win.

== Episodes ==
The episodes are ordered below according to Nickelodeon's packaging order, and not their original production or broadcast order.

No. overall	No. in season	Title	Animation direction by	Written by	Original release date	Prod. code	U.S. viewers (millions)
61	1	"Fear of a Krabby Patty"	Alan Smart	Written by : C.H. Greenblatt and Paul Tibbitt; Storyboarded by : C.H. Greenblatt (director), Zeus Cervas	May 6, 2005	5574–401	3.81 2.60 (HH) (Note: (HH) denotes the amount of households that an episode was viewed in on premiere.)
61	1	"Shell of a Man" "Molting"	Tom Yasumi	Written by : Mike Bell and Paul Tibbitt; Storyboarded by : Mike Bell and Vincent Waller (directors), Zeus Cervas & Brad Vandergrift	May 6, 2005	5574–402	3.81 2.60 (HH)
"Fear of a Krabby Patty": After seeing Plankton's tactic of keeping the Chum Bucket open for 23 hours, Mr. Krabs decides to keep the Krusty Krab open 24/7. Eventually, SpongeBob suffers a mental breakdown and develops a fear of Krabby Patties due to the nonstop work. Plankton pretends to be a psychiatrist, naming himself Dr. Peter Lankton in order to treat SpongeBob's phobia, and in turn get the Krabby Patty secret formula. Much to Plankton's dismay, SpongeBob stays asleep during a hypnosis session, where he overcomes his phobia in a dream, and goes back to the Krusty Krab fully rehabilitated. "Shell of a Man": Mr. Krabs is going to a Naval reunion, but he moults his shell right before the event. So SpongeBob attempts to impersonate Mr. Krabs by wearing the recently molted shell. At the reunion, everything is going well, until SpongeBob has to fight one of Mr. Krabs' buddies and the shell breaks in the process. The real Mr. Krabs comes out and tells the truth, but to the surprise of him and SpongeBob, Mr. Krabs' old buddies had secrets to hide themselves.
62	2	"The Lost Mattress"	Alan Smart	Written by : Mike Bell and Tim Hill; Storyboarded by : Mike Bell (director)	May 13, 2005	5574–406	3.34
62	2	"Krabs vs. Plankton"	Tom Yasumi	Written by : Tim Hill, Mike Mitchell, and Vincent Waller; Storyboarded by : Vincent Waller (director)	May 13, 2005	5574–403	3.34
"The Lost Mattress": Mr. Krabs is having trouble sleeping on his old mattress, so Patrick and SpongeBob buy him a new one and Squidward takes the credit. Unbeknownst to them, Mr. Krabs' money was in the mattress that has been thrown to the dump, causing him to fall into a "cash coma" and end up in the hospital. SpongeBob, Patrick, and Squidward try, but they are unable to retrieve the mattress from the dump due to a guard worm. Mr. Krabs is kicked out of the hospital for not having insurance and lands right on the mattress, waking him up, and he takes his mattress back from the worm. "Krabs vs. Plankton": After slipping on a wet floor while trying to steal a Krabby Patty, Plankton fakes a serious injury and sues Mr. Krabs, asking for the Krabby Patty Formula in his lawsuit. SpongeBob is forced to defend him after the same floor injures Mr. Krabs' high-priced lawyer. SpongeBob spends most of the trial trying to open a briefcase, but what's in it can help Mr. Krabs win the case.
63	3	"Have You Seen This Snail?" "Where's Gary"	Alan Smart and Tom Yasumi	Written by : Aaron Springer and Paul Tibbitt; Storyboarded by : Aaron Springer (director), Zeus Cervas, Garrett Ho, Brad Vandergrift and Erik Wiese	November 11, 2005	5574–404	7.93 4.95 (HH)
63	3	"Have You Seen This Snail?" "Where's Gary"	Alan Smart and Tom Yasumi	Written by : Aaron Springer and Paul Tibbitt; Storyboarded by : Aaron Springer (director), Zeus Cervas, Garrett Ho, Brad Vandergrift and Erik Wiese	November 11, 2005	5574–405	7.93 4.95 (HH)
SpongeBob takes the "Dirty Bubble Challenge" with his new paddleball set and neglects Gary in the process, which causes him to run away and be adopted by a senile old fish who mistakes him for her snail. While the woman seems gentle, she overfeeds Gary, who soon learns the old lady's bad history with snails.: Guest stars: Amy Poehler as The Old Lady, Stew
64	4	"Skill Crane"	Alan Smart	Written by : Kyle McCulloch, Aaron Springer, and Vincent Waller; Storyboarded by : Vincent Waller (director)	May 20, 2005	5574–407	3.26
64	4	"Good Neighbors"	Tom Yasumi	Written by : Mike Bell; Storyboarded by : Mike Bell and Aaron Springer (directors)	May 20, 2005	5574–408	3.26
"Skill Crane": Mr. Krabs purchases a claw arcade game for the Krusty Krab. Squidward loses on his first try, but when he sees SpongeBob win several prizes from the machine, he becomes addicted to it, only to continue to lose every time. With Mr. Krabs taking advantage of his insanity, Squidward soon puts all of his money, as well as the deed to his house, into the machine without winning anything. When SpongeBob tells him the secret to winning, Squidward finally wins something — a hairless teddy bear. His constant bragging eventually gets the better of him. "Good Neighbors": It's Sunday, and Squidward just wants to relax for his only day off. He has a pedicure scheduled for later in the afternoon, but SpongeBob and Patrick keep thwarting his plans and spoiling his day by inaugurating him as the unwilling president of a Good Neighbor organization. When Squidward is taken to the hospital by a couple who thinks he's sick, SpongeBob and Patrick end up getting his pedicure, enraging him into setting up a new security system in his home. Eventually, things get out of hand when Squidward's house comes to life and attacks Bikini Bottom.
65	5	"Selling Out"	Alan Smart	Written by : Zeus Cervas, Erik C. Wiese, and Tim Hill; Storyboarded by : Zeus Cervas and Erik C. Wiese (directors)	September 23, 2005	5574–409	2.53
65	5	"Funny Pants"	Tom Yasumi	Written by : Luke Brookshier, Tom King, and Steven Banks; Storyboarded by : Luke Brookshier and Tom King (directors)	September 30, 2005	5574–410	2.85
"Selling Out": Mr. Krabs sells the Krusty Krab to a franchise restaurateur and retires, leaving SpongeBob and Squidward with an over-peppy new manager and a new way of business. The new manager, Carl, renames the Krusty Krab to "Krabby O' Mondays" (based on TGI Fridays). Mr. Krabs, bored of retirement, takes a job as a busboy at the Krabby O' Mondays, but is shocked at the changes, especially to the Krabby Patties, now made with synthetic gray glop spray-painted to look like what was originally served at the Krusty Krab. Mr. Krabs then destroys Krabby O' Mondays, buys it back, and gets SpongeBob and Squidward their original jobs back. "Funny Pants": Squidward tricks SpongeBob into thinking he broke his "laugh box" after he is annoyed by his laughter one too many times. Concerned, SpongeBob attempts not to laugh for an entire day, and although he succeeds, he finds he cannot laugh anymore the next morning. He cries profusely until Squidward admits that he fooled him. Squidward then blows his own laugh box out while laughing at his attempt to fool SpongeBob. SpongeBob gives half of his laugh box to Squidward, causing him to laugh like SpongeBob.
66	6	"Dunces and Dragons" "Lost in Time"	Alan Smart and Tom Yasumi	Written by : Zeus Cervas, Erik Wiese, and Tim Hill; Storyboarded by : Zeus Cervas and Erik Wiese (directors)	February 20, 2006	5574–412	8.56 5.43 (HH)
66	6	"Dunces and Dragons" "Lost in Time"	Alan Smart and Tom Yasumi	Written by : Zeus Cervas, Erik Wiese, and Tim Hill; Storyboarded by : Zeus Cervas and Erik Wiese (directors)	February 20, 2006	5574–413	8.56 5.43 (HH)
After a jousting accident, SpongeBob and Patrick go back in time to restore peace to a kingdom in peril: a medieval Bikini Bottom.
67	7	"Enemy In-Law"	Andrew Overtoom	Written by : Tom King, Luke Brookshier, and Tim Hill; Storyboarded by : Luke Brookshier and Tom King (directors)	October 14, 2005	5574–414	2.08
67	7	"Mermaid Man and Barnacle Boy VI: The Motion Picture"	Andrew Overtoom	Written by : Casey Alexander, Chris Mitchell, and Paul Tibbitt; Storyboarded by : Casey Alexander and Chris Mitchell (directors)	October 7, 2005	5574–411	2.68
"Enemy In-Law": Plankton falls in love with Mr. Krabs' mother and begins to date her. When Mr. Krabs finds out, he tries to convince his mother that Plankton is only after the Krabby Patty secret formula, but Mama Krabs orders her son to stay out of her personal affairs. Mr. Krabs painfully obliges, until Plankton decides to pop the question. The next day, Plankton asks Mama Krabs to marry him, and Mr. Krabs tries to stop him. When she says no, Plankton asks for the secret formula, and Mama Krabs — finally seeing what Mr. Krabs was trying to tell her – angrily beats him up. "Mermaid Man and Barnacle Boy VI: The Motion Picture": After seeing a preview of a Mermaid Man and Barnacle Boy film that will not include the real heroes, SpongeBob and Patrick set out to make their own film, using the real Mermaid Man and Barnacle Boy, and with Pearl in a starring role. They also recruit some of their friends to help out, but run into many setbacks, including having the lens cap on this whole time meaning no footage was recorded. Finally, SpongeBob and Patrick present their movie at the Krusty Krab and the fan club attends. The end result is a poorly edited, one-minute long, low-quality film that disappoints fans of Mermaid Man and Barnacle Boy, but the heroes themselves are quite proud of it regardless.
68	8	"Patrick SmartPants"	Tom Yasumi	Written by : Casey Alexander, Chris Mitchell, and Tim Hill; Storyboarded by : Casey Alexander and Chris Mitchell (directors)	October 21, 2005	5574–415	2.73
68	8	"SquidBob TentaclePants"	Alan Smart	Written by : Zeus Cervas, Erik Wiese, and Steven Banks; Storyboarded by : Zeus Cervas and Erik Wiese (directors)	November 4, 2005	5574–416	3.28
"Patrick SmartPants": After falling off a cliff and accidentally receiving a brain coral, Patrick's intelligence increases significantly. SpongeBob wants Patrick to play with him but he finds SpongeBob childish and declines, and befriends with Squidward and Sandy instead. When Patrick's friendships with them quickly fall apart and falls into a slump, he realizes he misses being SpongeBob's friend, and after a round of fun not doing the trick, he jumps off the cliff again, and he and SpongeBob find out that he landed in a brain coral field. Patrick soon relocates his actual head, and he returns to normal. "SquidBob TentaclePants": On the eve of Squidward's big clarinet recital, he and SpongeBob are accidentally morphed together by Sandy's teleportation device. Daily life proves to be difficult for them when they are fused together. During Squidward's clarinet recital, their disguise falls off and everybody becomes amazed at how they are morphed together, but Sandy spoils the moment by sending the two back to their original form with her Molecular Separator Ray. Squidward, wanting to be famous again, tries to reverse the device by tampering with it, and ends up fusing himself with SpongeBob, Patrick, Mr. Krabs, Sandy, Pearl, Larry and Mrs. Puff into a grotesque flesh-colored blob. He then goes to a therapy session in this new form, now more miserable than ever.
69	9	"Krusty Towers"	Andrew Overtoom	Written by : Luke Brookshier, Tom King, and Steven Banks; Storyboarded by : Luke Brookshier and Tom King (directors)	April 1, 2006	5574–417	5.83 3.80 (HH)
69	9	"Mrs. Puff, You're Fired"	Tom Yasumi	Written by : Casey Alexander, Chris Mitchell, and Tim Hill; Storyboarded by : Casey Alexander and Chris Mitchell (directors)	April 1, 2006	5574–418	5.83 3.80 (HH)
"Krusty Towers": Due to his high hotel bill, Mr. Krabs believes hotels to be a gold mine and opens Krusty Towers, including a motto that says that guests must never be denied any of their requests (plagiarizing the motto from the other hotel). When Patrick checks in, Mr. Krabs orders Squidward to cater to his every whim, no matter how ridiculous it is. Squidward finally has enough, he quits and returns – as a guest, taking advantage of Mr. Krabs' motto. Squidward's unreasonable demands force Mr. Krabs to regret his motto. When the hotel falls apart and the four end up hospitalized, Mr. Krabs discovers that hospitals are way more overpriced than hotels, and decides to open one himself. "Mrs. Puff, You're Fired": Mrs. Puff is fired after SpongeBob fails his driving test again, and is replaced by a drill sergeant whose methods are uncommon. Under the new instructor, SpongeBob surprisingly masters the new instructor's difficult methods blindfolded. When it comes to the final exam, SpongeBob drives around Bikini Bottom and destroys the city.
70	10	"Chimps Ahoy"	Andrew Overtoom	Written by : Luke Brookshier, Tom King, and Steven Banks; Storyboarded by : Luke Brookshier and Tom King (directors)	May 5, 2006	5574–426	2.16
70	10	"Ghost Host"	Alan Smart	Written by : Zeus Cervas, Erik Wiese, and Tim Hill; Storyboarded by : Zeus Cervas and Erik Wiese (directors)	May 5, 2006	5574–419	2.16
"Chimps Ahoy": Sandy's benefactors from the surface threaten to pull her from the treedome if she cannot come up with an invention, and SpongeBob and Patrick decide to help her. "Ghost Host ": After his ship crashes and he is forced to live at SpongeBob's, the Flying Dutchman comes to the realization he is no longer scary, so SpongeBob has to help him find people to scare.
71	11	"Whale of a Birthday"	Tom Yasumi	Written by : Luke Brookshier, Tom King, and Paul Tibbitt; Storyboarded by : Luke Brookshier and Tom King (directors)	May 12, 2006	5574–423	2.85
71	11	"Karate Island"	Tom Yasumi	Written by : Casey Alexander, Chris Mitchell, and Steven Banks; Storyboarded by : Casey Alexander and Chris Mitchell (directors)	May 12, 2006	5574–421	2.85
"Whale of a Birthday": Pearl is turning sixteen years old, and warns Mr. Krabs not to give her a cheap party and gifts, like in the past. Mr. Krabs sends SpongeBob out with a credit card to buy presents for Pearl, and she turns out to love her party and gifts in the end. "Karate Island": SpongeBob wins an all-expenses-paid trip to "Karate Island", run by a real estate scammer who kidnaps him and forces Sandy to save him.
72	12	"All That Glitters"	Andrew Overtoom	Written by : Zeus Cervas, Erik Wiese, and Steven Banks; Storyboarded by : Zeus Cervas and Erik Wiese (directors)	June 2, 2006	5574–422	3.37
72	12	"Wishing You Well"	Andrew Overtoom	Written by : Luke Brookshier, Tom King, and Steven Banks; Storyboarded by : Luke Brookshier and Tom King (directors)	June 2, 2006	5574–420	3.37
"All That Glitters": While preparing a Monster Krabby Patty, SpongeBob's spatula snaps loose and he needs another one. SpongeBob invests all his money (and his own clothes) for a fancy hi-tech spatula. The mechanical spatula then refuses to do the job of a regular spatula, and then it runs away. The episode ends with his beloved spatula (which had recovered from its injuries) flipping some Krabby Patties. SpongeBob yet had to face another Monster Krabby Patty, this time snapping his arms – but he laughs at them without pain. "Wishing You Well": Mr. Krabs has SpongeBob and Squidward dig a wishing well in another moneymaking scheme and they help make wishes come true.
73	13	"New Leaf"	Alan Smart	Written by : Zeus Cervas, Erik Wiese, and Steven Banks; Storyboarded by : Zeus Cervas and Erik Wiese (directors)	September 22, 2006 (Note: This episode was first released in Karate Island DVD on July 18, 2006.)	5574–425	2.58
73	13	"Once Bitten"	Alan Smart	Written by : Casey Alexander, Chris Mitchell, and Steven Banks; Storyboarded by : Casey Alexander and Chris Mitchell (directors)	September 29, 2006	5574–424	3.05
"New Leaf": Plankton says he is giving up on his many attempts to steal the Krabby Patty formula, and has decided to turn the Chum Bucket into a gift shop. He even renames the Chum Bucket to The Chumporium. But Mr. Krabs is smart not to believe him, certain that it is just another one of Plankton's schemes to get the secret formula. "Once Bitten": A rabid Gary bites Squidward due to a splinter that infects him, but Patrick tells everyone that it is "Mad Snail Disease", causing the whole town to panic.
74	14	"Bummer Vacation"	Tom Yasumi	Written by : Casey Alexander, Chris Mitchell, and Dani Michaeli; Storyboarded by : Casey Alexander and Chris Mitchell (directors)	October 13, 2006	5574–427	3.10
74	14	"Wigstruck"	Alan Smart	Written by : Luke Brookshier, Tom King, and Dani Michaeli; Storyboarded by : Luke Brookshier and Tom King (directors)	November 17, 2006 (Note: This episode was first released in Whale of a Birthday DVD on October 31, 2006.)	5574–428	2.64
"Bummer Vacation": SpongeBob is forced to take his vacation days at work, but he refuses to accept that. When Patrick is hired as his temporary replacement, SpongeBob goes crazy and tries to get back to his favorite place, only to be kicked out by Mr. Krabs every time. "Wigstruck": SpongeBob begins wearing an old ratty wig around town to the ridicule of others.
75	15	"Squidtastic Voyage"	Tom Yasumi	Written by : Luke Brookshier, Tom King, and Dani Michaeli; Storyboarded by : Luke Brookshier and Tom King (directors)	October 6, 2006	5574–431	3.17
75	15	"That's No Lady"	Andrew Overtoom	Written by : Casey Alexander, Chris Mitchell, and Steven Banks; Storyboarded by : Casey Alexander and Chris Mitchell (directors)	November 25, 2006	5574–430	2.99
"Squidtastic Voyage": SpongeBob and Patrick cause Squidward to swallow his clarinet reed and they must retrieve it. "That's No Lady": After misinterpreting a salesman's pitch, Patrick disguises himself as a woman and immediately becomes the center of attention in Bikini Bottom.
76	16	"The Thing"	Andrew Overtoom	Written by : Zeus Cervas, Erik Wiese, and Steven Banks; Storyboarded by : Zeus Cervas and Erik Wiese (directors)	January 15, 2007 (Note: This episode was first released in Season 4, Volume 2 DVD on January 9, 2007.)	5574–429	3.60 2.88 (HH)
76	16	"Hocus Pocus"	Alan Smart	Written by : Casey Alexander, Chris Mitchell, and Steven Banks; Storyboarded by : Casey Alexander and Chris Mitchell (directors)	January 15, 2007	5574–432	3.60 2.88 (HH)
"The Thing": After Squidward's day is ruined yet again by SpongeBob and Patrick while he is trying to watch public television, he rides his bike into a cement mixer and emerges as a hideous-looking, unusual creature that SpongeBob and Patrick adopt. "Hocus Pocus": SpongeBob thinks he accidentally turned Squidward into an ice cream cone with a magic set.
77	17	"Driven to Tears"	Andrew Overtoom	Written by : Luke Brookshier, Tom King, and Steven Banks; Storyboarded by : Luke Brookshier and Tom King (directors)	February 19, 2007	5574–434	4.99 3.34 (HH)
77	17	"Rule of Dumb"	Tom Yasumi	Written by : Zeus Cervas, Erik Wiese, and Dani Michaeli; Storyboarded by : Zeus Cervas and Erik Wiese (directors)	February 19, 2007	5574–433	4.99 3.34 (HH)
"Driven to Tears": Patrick successfully passes his driving exam and it goes to his head, which makes SpongeBob very envious. Patrick repeatedly rubs his license on SpongeBob's face, causing SpongeBob to lose his temper. "Rule of Dumb": Patrick is revealed to have descended from King Amoeba and is thus now King of Bikini Bottom. Greedy, he quickly becomes tyrannical and power-abusive until he realises it and it is later revealed that in fact Gary is the true king.
78	18	"Born to Be Wild"	Tom Yasumi	Written by : Luke Brookshier, Tom King, and Steven Banks; Storyboarded by : Luke Brookshier and Tom King (directors)	March 31, 2007	5574–437	4.42 2.99 (HH)
78	18	"Best Frenemies"	Alan Smart	Written by : Zeus Cervas, Erik Wiese, and Dani Michaeli; Storyboarded by : Zeus Cervas and Erik Wiese (directors)	March 31, 2007	5574–436	4.42 2.99 (HH)
"Born to Be Wild": SpongeBob finds a patch from a biker's jacket in Jellyfish Fields of a biker club he encounters and immediately becomes frightened. Believing that the biker club is called "The Wild Ones" and that they are heading to attack Bikini Bottom, he and Patrick attempt to dress as tougher bikers themselves hoping to save the town. "Best Frenemies": After a smoothie stand selling "kelpshakes" opens near the Krusty Krab and the Chum Bucket, Plankton and Mr. Krabs work together to stop it.
79	19	"The Pink Purloiner"	Tom Yasumi	Written by : Luke Brookshier, Tom King, and Steven Banks; Storyboarded by : Luke Brookshier and Tom King (directors)	February 19, 2007	5574–440	5.39 3.41 (HH)
79	19	"Squid Wood"	Andrew Overtoom	Written by : Casey Alexander, Chris Mitchell, and Dani Michaeli; Storyboarded by : Casey Alexander and Chris Mitchell (directors)	July 24, 2007	5574–438	3.91
"The Pink Purloiner": There is a migration of many exotic jellyfish species. SpongeBob and Patrick bring their nets to catch them. However, SpongeBob's jellyfish net is missing and he thinks Patrick stole it. "Squid Wood": After Squidward won't play with SpongeBob, he makes a miniature wooden puppet version of Squidward that becomes much more popular than the actual Squidward.
80	20	"Best Day Ever"	Larry Leichliter	Written by : Nate Cash, Tuck Tucker, and Steven Banks; Storyboarded by : Nate Cash and Tuck Tucker (directors)	November 10, 2006	151–507	6.66
80	20	"The Gift of Gum"	Alan Smart	Written by : Zeus Cervas, Erik Wiese, and Dani Michaeli; Storyboarded by : Zeus Cervas and Erik Wiese (directors)	February 19, 2007	5574–439	5.39 3.41 (HH)
"Best Day Ever": SpongeBob wants to have the best day ever. He keeps a list of pastimes, including working at the Krusty Krab, jellyfishing, karate, and watching Squidward perform. However, several problems that occur that SpongeBob has to help fix prevent him from doing them. The people he helped earlier make it up to SpongeBob by performing a concert for him in the end. "The Gift of Gum": Patrick gives SpongeBob a huge wad of bubble gum on Best Friends' Day.

- (HH) indicates how many households the episode was viewed in.

== DVD release ==
The first ten episodes of the fourth season were released on DVD by Paramount Home Entertainment in the United States and Canada on September 12, 2006. The "Volume 1" DVD release features bonus material including animatics and featurettes. The remaining ten episodes of the season were also released under the title "Volume 2" in the United States and Canada on January 9, 2007. The DVD release also features bonus material including music videos, shorts and featurettes. In Region 2 and 4, the DVD release for the season was a complete set. On November 13, 2012, The Complete Fourth Season DVD was released in Region 1, five years after the season had completed broadcast on television.

SpongeBob SquarePants: Season 4, Volume 1
Set details			Special features
18 segment episodes; 2-disc set; 1.33:1 aspect ratio; Languages: English (Dolby Digital 5.1)			Animatics for "Fear of a Krabby Patty" and "Dunces and Dragons"; Behind the Scenes with SpongeBob SquarePants featurette
Release dates			Animatics for "Fear of a Krabby Patty" and "Dunces and Dragons"; Behind the Scenes with SpongeBob SquarePants featurette
Region 1	Region 2	Region 4	Animatics for "Fear of a Krabby Patty" and "Dunces and Dragons"; Behind the Scenes with SpongeBob SquarePants featurette
September 12, 2006	November 3, 2008	November 7, 2008	Animatics for "Fear of a Krabby Patty" and "Dunces and Dragons"; Behind the Scenes with SpongeBob SquarePants featurette

SpongeBob SquarePants: Season 4, Volume 2
Set details			Special features
20 segment episodes; 2-disc set; 1.33:1 aspect ratio; Languages: English (Dolby Digital 5.1)			"Best Day Ever" shorts; Best Day Ever Karaoke Music Video; Behind the Scenes with Pick Boy and SpongeBob
Release dates			"Best Day Ever" shorts; Best Day Ever Karaoke Music Video; Behind the Scenes with Pick Boy and SpongeBob
Region 1	Region 2	Region 4	"Best Day Ever" shorts; Best Day Ever Karaoke Music Video; Behind the Scenes with Pick Boy and SpongeBob
January 9, 2007	November 3, 2008	November 7, 2008	"Best Day Ever" shorts; Best Day Ever Karaoke Music Video; Behind the Scenes with Pick Boy and SpongeBob
