= Dunces and Dragons =

- SpongeBob SquarePants episode
- Title card for the episode
- Episode no.: Season 4 Episode 6
- Directed by: Alan Smart (animation and supervising); Tom Yasumi (animation); Zeus Cervas (storyboard director); Erik Wiese (storyboard); Monica Tomova (storyboard artist)
- Written by: Zeus Cervas; Erik Wiese; Tim Hill
- Production code: 5574-412/5574-413
- Original air date: February 20, 2006

Episode chronology
← Previous "Funny Pants"	Next → "Enemy In-Law"
- SpongeBob SquarePants season 4

"Dunces and Dragons" (also known as "Lost in Time") is the sixth episode of the fourth season of the American animated television series SpongeBob SquarePants, and the 66th episode overall. It was written by Zeus Cervas, Erik Wiese, and Tim Hill, and the animation was directed by supervising director Alan Smart and Tom Yasumi; Cervas and Wiese also functioned as storyboard directors. The episode originally aired on Nickelodeon in the United States as a half-hour special on February 20, 2006.

In the episode, SpongeBob and Patrick travel back in time to a medieval kingdom ruled by Mr. Krabs' ancestor. The kingdom is being attacked by an evil wizard named Planktonamor, who captures King Krabs' daughter, Princess Pearl. With help from Squidly and the Dark Knight, ancestors of Squidward and Sandy, SpongeBob and Patrick embark on a quest to rescue Princess Pearl.

Tie-in promotions were made with Burger King, which released a series of toys based on the episode. "Dunces and Dragons" was the most successful of the season, drawing 8.6 million viewers, and was met with positive reviews. It was also elected as the third most-voted episode on the "Best Day Ever" marathon, behind "Karate Island" and "Wishing You Well", episodes from the same season.

== Plot summary ==
SpongeBob and Patrick attend a jousting tournament at the Medieval Moments restaurant, where they volunteer to participate in the tournament. They are put on seahorses and given lances. The seahorses charge without warning, and SpongeBob and Patrick are thrown out of the building into an 11th-century Bikini Bottom.

A group of knights surrounds and imprison them with Squidward's ancestor, Squidly the jester. Eventually, Mr. Krabs' ancestor, King Krabs, orders SpongeBob, Patrick, and Squidly to the throne room, where they are to be executed for insulting him with a song. However, Princess Pearl reminds King Krabs of the prophecy that two brave knights will be sent by the king to defeat the evil wizard Planktonamor, who terrorizes the kingdom with his dragon jellyfish.

Moments later, Planktonamor's dragon kidnaps Princess Pearl, and King Krabs begs SpongeBob and Patrick to rescue her, who gladly accept along with Squidly. Soon after, the trio approaches Planktonamor's tower, where an ancestor of Sandy Cheeks known as the Dark Knight blocks them. After a karate duel against SpongeBob, the Dark Knight decides to help the group on their quest. At the top of the tower, the group encounters the dragon, who becomes an ally to them after SpongeBob gives it a Krabby Patty. The dragon destroys Planktonamor, and the group returns to the kingdom to celebrate. Once there, the seahorses become aggressive, tossing SpongeBob and Patrick once again. After waking up, the pair find themselves in present-day Bikini Bottom at the joust, with SpongeBob believing it was all a dream. However, Patrick notices that he has landed on Squidly, revealing that they did indeed travel through time.

== Production ==
"Dunces and Dragons" was written by Zeus Cervas, Erik Wiese, and Tim Hill, with Alan Smart and Tom Yasumi serving as animation directors. Cervas and Wiese also functioned as storyboard directors. The episode originally aired on Nickelodeon in the United States on February 20, 2006. Before the episode's premiere, Nickelodeon released a preview clip of the episode on their broadband online platform, TurboNick, and the full episode aired on TurboNick following the television premiere. On January 26, Nickelodeon released the "SpongeBob: Dunces and Dragons" Flash game. Nickelodeon promoted the episode as "Lost in Time". Marjorie Cohn, Executive Vice President of Development and Original Programming for Nickelodeon, said "'Lost in Time' offers fans the opportunity to see SpongeBob and the gang in an outrageous new setting and historical time period. It's fun to watch SpongeBob in a suit of armor riding a seahorse, and bringing karate to the Middle Ages."

Marketing campaign for the episode was managed by Frank Tanki. Nickelodeon's Friday Night Slimetime premiered a special edition called Monday Knight Slimetime, for the episode. The game segments were replaced with themes and characters from the episode such as Jellyfish Joust and Slimy Sword Battle. The games began on February 20, and led up to the premiere of "Lost in Time". The winners were dubbed "Knights of the Square Table." Prior to the premiere Nickelodeon also aired a SpongeBob marathon from 4:00-8:00 p.m., showing episodes with hero themes.

Nickelodeon also tied-in with Burger King to release a promotional toyline based on the episode. The toyline consisted of 20 different figures. Burger King rolled out global promotional sweepstakes called "Lost in Time With SpongeBob SquarePants", which offered customers a trip to one of the countries visited by SpongeBob in the episode. To enter, participants wrote a 25-word adventure story for the chances of winning a trip to England, Spain, Germany, or Mexico. Other prizes included a family trip to Orlando at the Nickelodeon Hotel, and a SpongeBob SquarePants: Lost in Time DVD.

Due to the episode's success, Burger King debuted the toyline in the Middle East. Yasser Abdel Azim, marketing manager for Burger King UAE, said, "Burger King is looking forward to bringing the fun and excitement of SpongeBob to our restaurants. Our young patrons will surely enjoy the memorabilia themed on the hilarious cartoon character."

"Dunces and Dragons" became available on the DVD and VHS of the same name on February 21, 2006. It was also included on the SpongeBob SquarePants: Season 4 Volume 1 DVD released on September 12, 2006. On September 22, 2009, "Dunces and Dragons" was released in the SpongeBob SquarePants: The First 100 Episodes DVD, alongside all the episodes of seasons one through five.

== Reception ==
In its initial airing, "Dunces and Dragons" was seen by a total of 8.6 million viewers in the United States, with 5.2 million of them being children aged 2–11, making it the biggest audience of the year to date among children, behind the Super Bowl. The episode was also the highest-rated program on Nickelodeon in about five years.

The episode received positive reviews from media critics. In his review for the DVD Talk, Paul Mavis positively reacted to the episode. He said, "'Dunces & Dragons' puts a new spin on the old A Connecticut Yankee in King Arthur's Court theme and it's fun to see how the show's writers have adapted the characters from the show into this medieval setting." In 2024, J.S. Gornael of Collider ranked the episode number 10 on his list "SpongeBob SquarePants 10 Best Season 4 Episodes, Ranked". Shawn S. Lealos of Screen Rant ranked the episode number 7 on his "Every SpongeBob SquarePants Movie & Special, Ranked" list. Alexandra Ramos of CinemaBlend ranked the episode number 3 on her list of "The Best Spongebob Squarepants Specials, Ranked." She said, "There are so many elements here that touch on the common themes of medieval culture in the fantasy genre that work so well, but that also mesh with the typical SpongeBob humor, which kids can enjoy." Speaking less positively of the special, technical director (now showrunner) Vincent Waller, in response to a question on Twitter asking what his least favorite episode of SpongeBob was, stated in 2017, "I'm not fond of the one where [the characters] go back to the time of Knights of old." He later added, "[I] didn't think it was bad, but felt it would have been better as an 11 minute, rather than 22."
