= Bethany Donaphin =

American basketball player (born 1980)

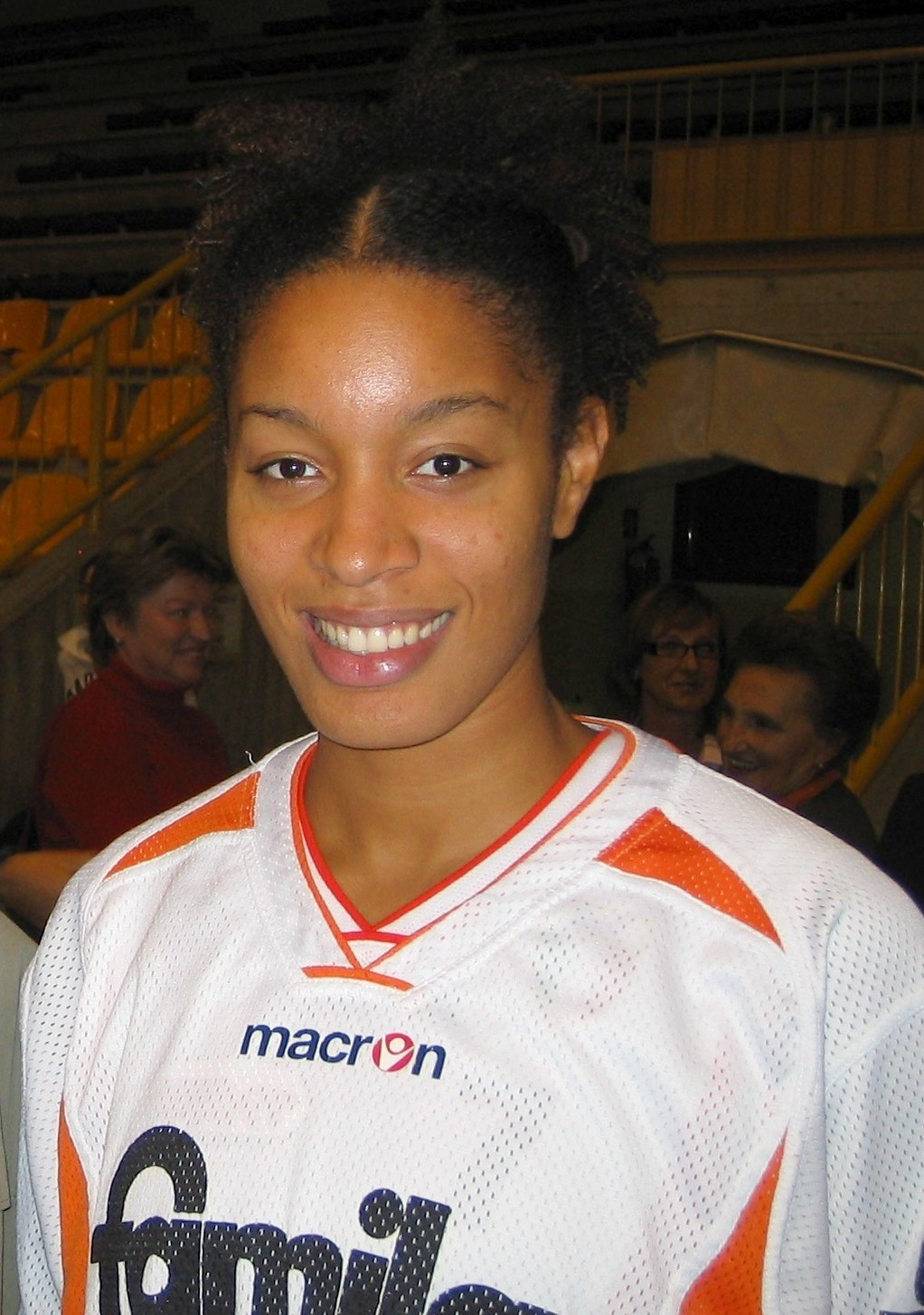
- Donaphin with Famila Schio

Personal information
- Born: August 27, 1980 (age 46) New York City, New York, U.S.
- Listed height: 6 ft 2 in (1.88 m)

Career information
- High school: Horace Mann (Bronx, New York)
- College: Stanford (1998–2002)
- WNBA draft: 2002: undrafted
- Playing career: 2002–2008
- Position: Power forward / center
- Number: 41, 7

Career history
- 2003–2004: New York Liberty
- Stats at Basketball Reference

Bethany Donaphin (born August 27, 1980) is an American former professional basketball player who is the Head of League Operations for the Women's National Basketball Association (WNBA). She previously worked as Associate Vice President of Basketball Operations for the National Basketball Association (NBA). In 2020, she was named to Sports Business Journal's "Forty Under 40".

In September 2026, she was named as a potential successor to WNBA commissioner Cathy Engelbert by ESPN, The Athletic, and TSN.

Donaphin played for the New York Liberty of the WNBA as a forward from 2003 to 2004. She also played for Famila Schio in Italy and for Fenerbahçe İstanbul in Turkey (2004–05). She played collegiately for the Stanford Cardinal.

== Early life ==
Donaphin was raised in Midtown Manhattan and attended The Cathedral School of St. John the Divine and the Horace Mann School before attending Stanford University where she majored in public policy. In 2012, she earned a Master of Business Administration (MBA) from Wharton School of the University of Pennsylvania.

As a youth, Bethany coupled basketball with dance lessons at The Harlem School of the Arts, Dance Theatre of Harlem, and Alvin Ailey American Dance Theater. She gained professional experience as an intern with the NBA, ESPN The Magazine, and the Walt Disney Company. She also worked with J.P. Morgan and Kraft through professional immersion programs.

After earning her MBA, she worked as a management consultant at Deloitte where she worked with Fortune 500 companies on global business model transformations.

== Career statistics ==
=== WNBA ===
Legend
GP	Games played	GS	Games started	MPG	Minutes per game	RPG	Rebounds per game
APG	Assists per game	SPG	Steals per game	BPG	Blocks per game	PPG	Points per game
TO	Turnovers per game	FG%	Field-goal percentage	3P%	3-point field-goal percentage	FT%	Free-throw percentage
**Bold**	Career best	°	League leader

==== Regular season ====
Year	Team	GP	GS	MPG	FG%	3P%	FT%	RPG	APG	SPG	BPG	TO	PPG
2003	New York	1	0	2.0	0.0	0.0	0.0	0.0	0.0	0.0	0.0	**0.0**	0.0
2004	New York	**26**	**16**	**18.4**	**46.2**	0.0	**54.1**	**2.7**	**0.6**	**0.4**	**0.3**	0.8	**5.0**
Career	2 years, 1 team	27	16	17.8	46.2	0.0	54.1	2.6	0.6	0.4	0.3	0.8	4.9

==== Playoffs ====
Year	Team	GP	GS	MPG	FG%	3P%	FT%	RPG	APG	SPG	BPG	TO	PPG
2004	New York	5	5	19.2	40.0	0.0	40.0	2.2	0.4	1.4	0.4	1.0	4.4
Career	1 year, 1 team	5	5	19.2	40.0	0.0	40.0	2.2	0.4	1.4	0.4	1.0	4.4

=== College ===
Legend
GP	Games played	GS	Games started	MPG	Minutes per game
FG%	Field goal percentage	3P%	3-point field goal percentage	FT%	Free throw percentage
RPG	Rebounds per game	APG	Assists per game	SPG	Steals per game
BPG	Blocks per game	PPG	Points per game	**Bold**	Career high

Year	Team	GP	Points	FG%	3P%	FT%	RPG	APG	SPG	BPG	PPG
1998-99	Stanford	28	201	53.5%	0.0%	0.6%	**6.1**	0.5	**0.6**	0.9	7.2
1999-00	Stanford	30	289	52.4%	0.0%	**59.8%**	5.4	0.6	0.5	1.0	**9.6**
2000-01	Stanford	redshirt									
2001-02	Stanford	**35**	**306**	**59.1%**	0.0%	37.6%	4.9	**0.7**	0.5	**1.5**	8.7
Career		93	796	55.3%	0.0%	53.2%	5.4	0.6	0.5	1.2	8.6

== Sports administration career ==
=== Associate Vice President of Basketbal Operations, NBA, 2016-18 ===
Donaphin worked as Associate VP of Basketball Operations for the National Basketball Association (NBA) in 2016-18 before becoming the Head of League Operations for the WNBA in May 2018. As Associate Vice President of Basketball Operations at the NBA, she led programs for retired players transitioning into the business world and served as an advisor on projects related to the NBA, WNBA and G League.

=== Head of League Operations, WNBA, 2018-present ===
As Head of League Operations for the WNBA, she leads league-wide on-court basketball operations, including rule change management, conduct standard enforcement, game official evaluations, as well as analytics and innovation efforts. She is also responsible for player-related policies and program administration. In this role, Donaphin has partnered with USA Basketball, the NCAA, and the Women’s Basketball Coaches Association to grow the game. She has also led the league's social justice platform.

Starting in 2019, Donaphin built a pathway for former WNBA players to become head coaches in the league by requiring teams have at least one former WNBA player on their coaching staff. By 2022,

- 58.3% of head coaching positions and 64.7% of assistant coaching positions were held by women
- 50% of the league’s head coaches were women of color
- 61.7% of assistant coaches were women of color

In September 2026, she was named as a potential successor to WNBA commissioner Cathy Engelbert by ESPN, The Athletic, and TSN.
