= Alex Westerman =

American creative director

Alexander Westerman
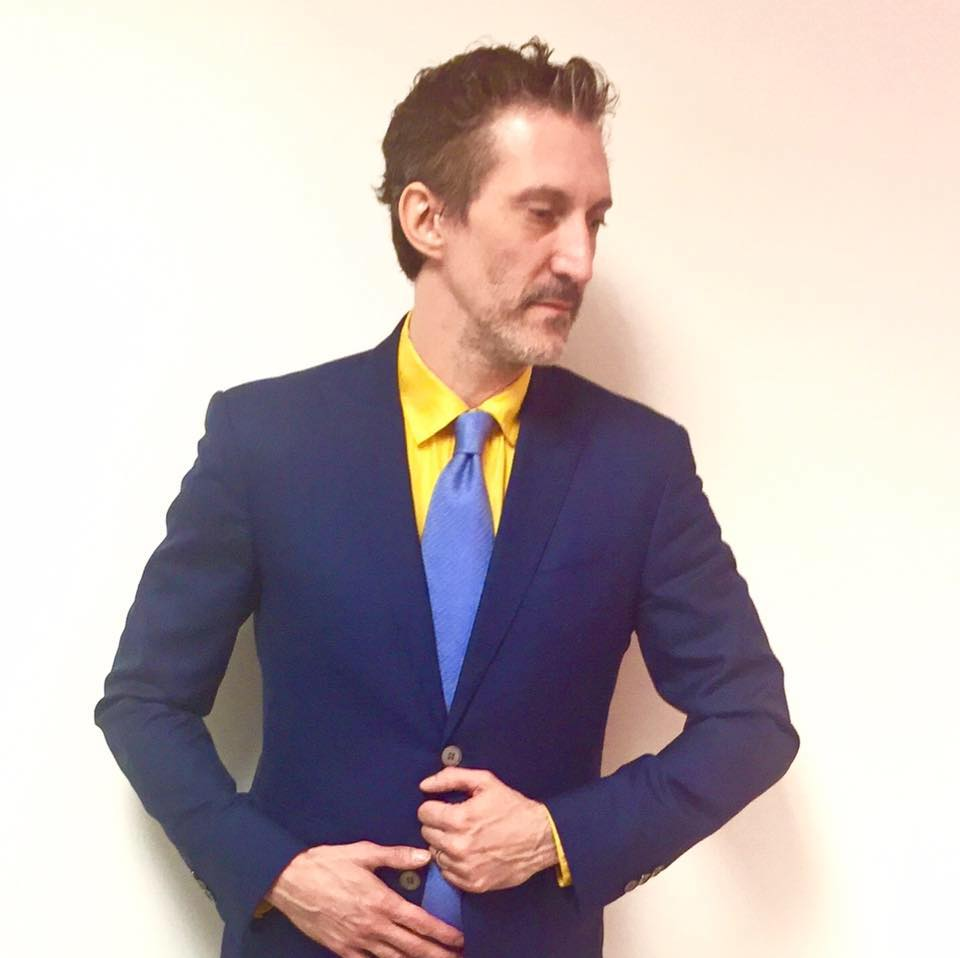
- Homage to David Bowie
- Born: New York City
- Education: School of American Ballet; The Cathedral School of St. John the Divine; George School; Ithaca College (BA, Art History, 1991)
- Occupation: Creative Director
- Spouse: David Gleason

Alexander Westerman is an American creative director based in Los Angeles.

== Career ==
Westerman started out as a prop master and art director. Westerman's experience ranges from television to movie and theater productions. He was an executive in charge of development at Bona Dea Productions, a production executive of The Weissberger Theatre Group, and an assistant to producer Fred Zollo for one year. In 2000, Westerman left his job at Disney to found a start-up called RadicalZoo. RadicalZoo was to be a destination for independent filmmakers.

RadicalZoo folded in 2003. Westerman joined the staff of Nickelodeon in 2004 and went on to create sites and applications for the company. Westerman lead the team that created Nicktropolis the virtual world. In 2009, Westerman left Nickelodeon to become Creative Director Worldwide Marketing and Communications for Mattel.

In 2007–2008, Westerman created an Adobe Air application as an Adobe launch partner. The application was the first game to be created using the air runtime. The game allows users to engage in a scavenger hunt, collecting jigsaw puzzle pieces and assemble and solve the puzzle offline in the Air runtime.

In 2012 Westerman joined Guthy-Renker as head of digital creative.

In 2015 Westerman joined Spark Networks as head of creative.

== Personal life ==
In the spring of 2014, Westerman married David Gleason, senior vice president of research for E! and Esquire Network.

== Early work ==
Westerman's early training was in ballet; he studied at the School of American Ballet in New York, and while attending Ithaca College choreographed ballets for the dance school.

At Nickelodeon Westerman was production director of Nicktropolis.

== Involvement with REDCAT Theater ==
In 2017 Westerman accepted a position on the REDCAT (Roy and Edna Disney/CalArts Theater) COUNCIL having served as a Circle member from 2010 to 2017.

== Awards for associated websites ==
- Webby Awards 2010 - Online Games - Mattel.com/games
- In 2004, ThrillNetwork.com was named Forbes Summer 2004 Best of the Web Pick.
