= Have You Seen This Snail? =

- SpongeBob SquarePants episode
- Title card
- Episode no.: Season 4 Episode 3
- Directed by: Aaron Springer (storyboard); Alan Smart (animation and supervising); Tom Yasumi (animation)
- Written by: Aaron Springer; Paul Tibbitt
- Production code: 5574-404/5574-405
- Original air date: November 11, 2005

Guest appearances
- Amy Poehler as Grandma; Stew as himself

Episode chronology
← Previous "Krabs vs. Plankton"	Next → "Skill Crane"
- SpongeBob SquarePants (season 4)

"Have You Seen This Snail?", also known as "Where's Gary?" and originally known as "Gary's Great Escape", is the third episode of the fourth season and the 63rd overall episode of the American animated television series SpongeBob SquarePants. Its animation was directed by supervising director, Alan Smart and Tom Yasumi, and written by storyboard director Aaron Springer and supervising producer Paul Tibbitt. The episode originally aired on Nickelodeon in the United States on November 11, 2005. Actress and comedian Amy Poehler guest starred in the episode as the voice of Grandma. It is the first double-length episode to not be hosted by Patchy the Pirate in a framing device.

The series follows the adventures and endeavors of the title character and his various friends in the underwater city of Bikini Bottom. In this episode, Gary, SpongeBob's pet sea snail, runs away from home after feeling neglected by a distracted SpongeBob and is adopted by a new owner. After realizing the error of his ways, SpongeBob sets out with his best friend Patrick to search for his adored pet and bring him back to his rightful home.

The episode garnered eight million viewers, achieving the highest number of cable television viewers aged six to eleven years old for 2005. "Have You Seen This Snail?" received generally positive reviews from television critics upon release.

Musician Stew performed the song "Gary's Song", which was later performed as an instrumental by Kenny G for The SpongeBob Movie: Sponge on the Run.

== Plot summary ==
SpongeBob receives a paddle ball sent to him in the mail and begins to play with it. He is totally consumed by the challenge of hitting the ball an absurd number of times and forgets to feed his pet snail Gary for ten days. Feeling neglected, Gary runs away from home. SpongeBob is shaken from his infatuation with the arrival of Patrick, and finds a note saying that Gary has left in search of a new owner. Gary wanders into a new city, where an old lady mistakes him for one of her pets, Miss Tuffsy. Gary is showered with love and food while SpongeBob goes to work, sad that his pet is still missing. Mr. Krabs encourages SpongeBob to work, but SpongeBob misinterprets his words, and he takes the day off to look for Gary. He and Patrick put up posters and signs everywhere in the hope of finding Gary.

At the old lady's house, Gary is well-fed & finds and reads one of the flyers. Realizing that SpongeBob truly loves him, Gary tries to leave, but accidentally finds a closet filled with empty snail shells. When the old lady tries to feed him again, Gary suspects that the old lady has sinister motives—she is possibly trying to fatten and then eat him. He makes his escape, but the old lady chases him out onto the streets. Gary finds a feral snail, which the old lady now mistakes for Miss Tuffsy, and takes him home instead. Back home, SpongeBob gives up on his search for Gary, and tries to forget about him by taking a walk, but his memories keep coming to mind and upsetting him. He is constantly reminded as the streets are filled with posters and signs for Gary. SpongeBob hears a meow and turns around to find Gary at his side; he is overjoyed and reunited with his beloved pet again and apologizes to Gary for doubting him, to which Gary forgives him.

== Production ==
Promotional artwork for the episode depicting SpongeBob putting up posters and signs.

"Have You Seen This Snail?" is a 22 minute long special episode written by supervising producer Paul Tibbitt, with Aaron Springer serving as writer and storyboard director, and supervising director, Alan Smart and Tom Yasumi serving as animation directors. The episode originally aired on Nickelodeon in the United States on November 11, 2005. Prior to its premiere, Nickelodeon released a preview clip and bonus coverage of the episode on Nickelodeon's broadband online platform TurboNick, available on Nick.com. Nickelodeon also launched the "Trail of the Snail" Flash game.

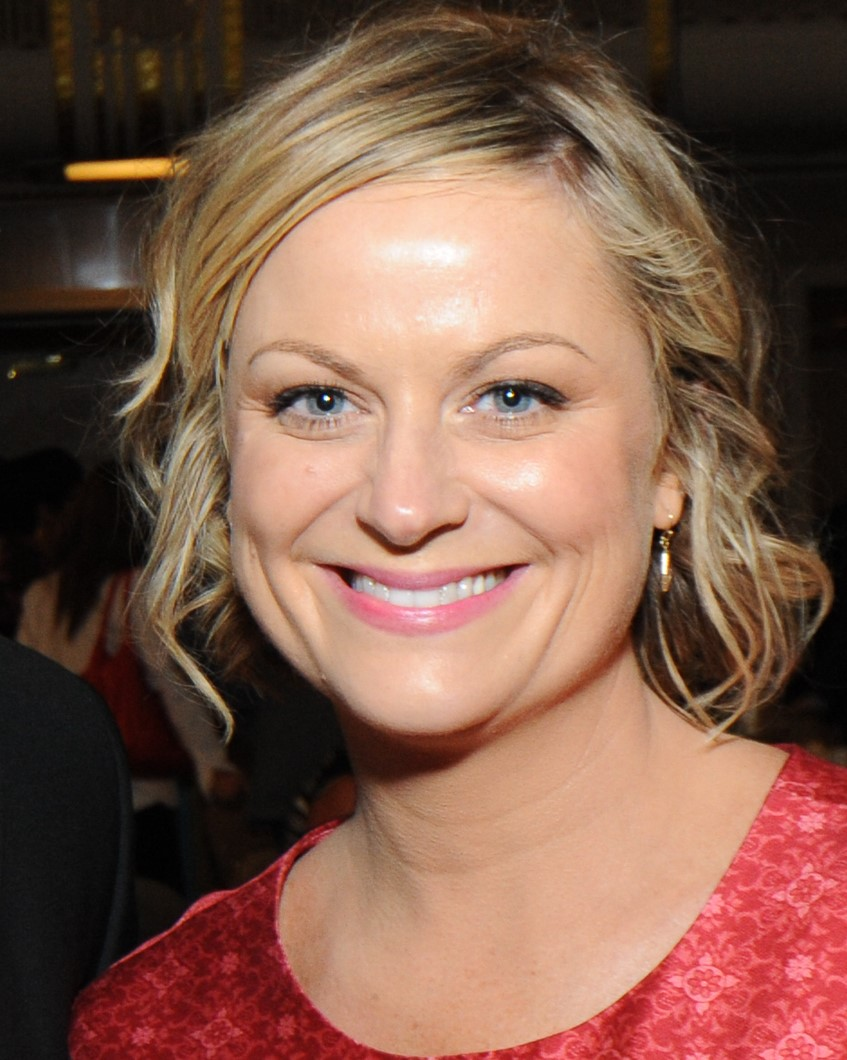
Actress and comedian Amy Poehler, shown here in 2013, guest starred in the episode as the voice of Grandma.

In a press release on November 1, 2005, Nickelodeon officially announced the episode and promoted it as the "Where's Gary" special. According to the network, "It's a sad day in Bikini Bottom when SpongeBob learns that his beloved pet snail Gary is missing and that he may be at fault in the mollusk's disappearance." Marjorie Cohn, Executive Vice President of Development and Original Programming for Nickelodeon, said "Kids love their pets and there's certainly some relatability here in the relationship between SpongeBob and Gary -- skewed though it may be It's fun to see Gary express a whole range of emotions using only his signature 'meow.'"

In addition to the regular cast, American comedian and Saturday Night Live actress Amy Poehler guest starred in the episode as the voice of Grandma, an evil and manipulative old woman who adopted Gary and tries to fatten him up to eat him after Gary runs away. "Have You Seen This Snail?" featured an original piece of music written for the episode by the American musician Stew, entitled "Gary's Song" and commonly referred as "Gary, Come Home".

Nickelodeon supported the episode with a month-long off-air marketing campaign including print, outdoor and consumer product partner support. Nickelodeon also launched an on-air sweepstakes called "Where's Gary". Every night for five days leading to the episode's premiere, Patchy the Pirate (a character portrayed as the president of the SpongeBob SquarePants Fan Club played by Tom Kenny), and other celebrity guests searched in various locations for Gary. By visiting Nick.com, the viewers could receive a "Trail of The Snail" tracking card to enter Patchy's search locations in order to win the sweepstakes. The prize was a trip to the Nickelodeon Animation Studios to meet the production team of the show and to sit in on a voice recording session with the series cast.

On November 15, 2005, "Have You Seen This Snail?" was released on the DVD compilation called Where's Gary. In addition, the compilation features six other episodes: "The Lost Mattress", "Krabs vs. Plankton", "Good Neighbors", "Skill Crane", and "The Great Snail Race". It was also included on the SpongeBob SquarePants: Season 4, Vol. 1 DVD released on September 12, 2006. On September 22, 2009, "Have You Seen This Snail?" was released in the SpongeBob SquarePants: The First 100 Episodes DVD, alongside all the episodes of seasons one through five.

== Reception ==
Silly? Yes. Outrageous? Of course. Unforgivably and inexcusably ridiculous? Well, no. The ridiculousness is quite forgivable and is its own excuse. While the supporting players contribute substantially to the episodes -- Sandy Cheeks the squirrel, misanthropic Squidward and penny-pinching Mr. Krabs, custodian of the priceless recipe for Krabby Patties -- it's SpongeBob who is the show's goofy, glowing source of comic energy.

— Tom Shales in his review for The Washington Post.

"Have You Seen This Snail?" was watched by eight million viewers. It was the highest-rated program on all TV with children aged two-eleven for the year of 2005 behind the Super Bowl and the Super Bowl kick-off, and the highest-rated program on all of cable with children aged two to eleven and children aged six to eleven in 2005.

"Have You Seen This Snail?" received mostly positive reviews from television critics. Tom Shales of The Washington Post called the episode deeply hilarious and described the plot as a "bittersweet riot". He drew attention to how the story is similar to the plot of "Dumped", an earlier episode in which Gary deserted SpongeBob. David Johnson of the DVD Verdict positively reacted to the DVD release of the episode and said "I'm not sure what to say, here. Mr. Squarepants is so ridiculously popular, this disc will most definitely sell itself." Aida Ekberg of Yahoo! Voices ranked Amy Poehler on her "Top 10 SpongeBob SquarePants Guest Stars" list and said "I'm surprised more comedians haven't been guest stars on SpongeBob. Amy Poehler does a great job with her creepy grandma voice, playing pure evil masked behind plate after plate of chocolate chip cookies." Paul Mavis of DVD Talk loved the scene "[when] Gary realizes he has to escape from her crushing love (which equals constant overeating) or die like the other snail shells he finds", noting, "it's both funny and rather touching."

Nader Michael of the St. Petersburg Times was not so positive about the episode, however, criticizing how SpongeBob's disappointed and sad character for "Have You Seen This Snail?" is quite different from the character's normal bright personality. Blogger and Blogcritics founder Eric Olsen said "the episode itself is rather wan and slack, notably lacking in the air of giddy zaniness that millions of men, women and, um, children so happily cleave to."
