= Welcome to the Wayne =

Animated television series

- Genre: Adventure; Mystery; Science fantasy; Urban fantasy; Comedy; Action
- Created by: Billy Lopez
- Based on: Welcome to the Wayne by Billy Lopez
- Developed by: Michael Pecoriello; Billy Lopez
- Directed by: Tahir Rana; Rick Ritter
- Voices of: Alanna Ubach; Billy Lopez; Dana Steingold
- Theme music composer: Anna Waronker; Charlotte Caffey
- Opening theme: "Welcome to the Wayne!" by Anna Waronker & Charlotte Caffey
- Ending theme: "Welcome to the Wayne!" (Instrumental)
- Composer: Ego Plum
- Countries of origin: United States; Canada
- Original language: English
- No. of seasons: 2
- No. of episodes: 30 (list of episodes)

Production
- Executive producer: Michael Pecoriello
- Producers: Sara Kamen; Lacey Stanton; Alan Foreman; Jeffrey Lesser
- Running time: 4–7 minutes (web series); 22 minutes (TV series)
- Production companies: Yowza! Animation; Nickelodeon Animation Studio

Original release
- Network: Nick.com
- Release: November 14 – December 26, 2014
- Network: Nickelodeon
- Release: July 24 – September 21, 2017
- Network: Nicktoons
- Release: October 15, 2018 – May 31, 2019

Welcome to the Wayne is an animated television series created by Billy Lopez that premiered on Nickelodeon on July 24, 2017. Welcome to the Wayne originated as an online web series, that was originally released on Nick.com from November 14 to December 26, 2014. The series was nominated for two Daytime Emmy Awards: one in 2018 for Outstanding Writing in an Animated Program and another in 2019 for Outstanding Children's Animated Program. The final episode aired on Nicktoons on May 31, 2019.

== Plot ==
Ansi Molina moves into the Wayne, a high-rise apartment building filled with strange and unusual things labeled as "Wayne Phenomena". Being one of the few people to see Wayne Phenomena without suffering psychological repercussions, he befriends siblings Olly and Saraline Timbers as they learn the mysteries of the Wayne and protects the outside world while contending with a spy cell seeking to exploit the apartment's supernatural aspects for their own nefarious ends.

== Characters ==
=== Main ===
- Ansi Molina (voiced by Alanna Ubach) is the main protagonist. Still a newcomer to the Wayne, Ansi has lived in many different places with his family in the past. He has had few friends or social experiences as a result, and is comforted primarily by books. A recent recruit to Team Timbers, he is often unfamiliar with Wayne Phenomena and needs it to be explained to him, but sometimes dislikes being treated as inexperienced by Olly and Saraline as a result. He is nonetheless loyal to them as his best friends.
- Olly Timbers (voiced by Billy Lopez) is Ansi's best friend and Saraline's older brother. He is sunny and optimistic even when Team Timbers' lives are in danger, but despite his outgoing and silly demeanor, has proven that he can be thoughtful and intelligent when the situation calls for it. He is equipped with a grappling hook.
- Saraline Timbers (voiced by Dana Steingold) is Olly's seven (later in season one, eight)-year-old sister, Saraline is serious, intelligent, and skilled with gadgets, and often acts as Team Timbers' leader. She is sometimes characterized as "bossy" by her brother and Ansi as a result. Saraline often struggles with making and maintaining friendships. She is not taken seriously by adults at the Wayne, who believe her to be only a "little girl". She is often equipped with an extendable claw device.

=== Supporting ===
- Leif Bornwell III (voiced by David Hornsby; originally voiced by Noah Galvin) is a rich and somewhat selfish resident of the Wayne who credits himself for others' actions and whom Team Timbers has difficulty tolerating, often seen riding on a segway. He and Saraline become friends due to their feelings of mutual social isolation. Leif later becomes an official member of Team Timbers.
- Wendell William Wasserman (voiced by Dana Snyder) is the son of vampire hunters and seeks to capture a vampire for himself to prove that he is as capable as his parents. He is somewhat friendly with Ansi due to their shared desire to prove themselves. In his capacity as a vampire hunter, Wendell can telepathically control spoons, which terrify vampires. Wendell later becomes an official member of Team Timbers.
- Dennis O'Bannon (voiced by Emo Philips) is a tennis-playing rich kid who originally picked on Team Timbers until he befriended and joined Team Timbers, though he still harasses Olly out of habit.
- Goodness (voiced by Charnele Crick) is a library ninja who is Clara Rhone's granddaughter, later becoming an official member of Team Timbers.
- Katherine Alice (voiced by Kimiko Glenn) is a mute girl who joins Team Timbers, able to bring origami to life. She later gains her voice in season 2.
- Albert Molina (voiced by Alfred Molina) is Ansi's divorced father who works as a psychiatrist.
- Harvey Timbers (voiced by Richard Kind) is the father of Olly and Saraline and the husband of Olympia. He also works as a comedian.
- Olympia Timbers (voiced by Annie Potts) is the mother of Olly and Saraline and Harvey's wife.
- Yelena Bishop (voiced by Veronica Taylor, originally credited as Kathleen McInerney) – Known by Team Timbers as "The Spy from Apartment 8-I", she is an operative from the Calliope organization with the designation of "Agent 31-B". She serves as the principal antagonist in the first season by using the Vampires of Glamsterdam to take control of the Wayne. Following her defeat in the season 1 finale, she is forced to play host for her superior Prismal with her mission changed to eliminate Team Timbers. In the series finale, Yelena is to be revealed to be Jonah's wife.
  - Masterson (voiced by Marc Thompson) is Yelena's associate in Calliope who normally carries out daily choirs for her and Prismal when not helping them in their agenda.
  - Flowershirt (voiced by Robbie Sublett, originally voiced by Bill Lobley) is an associate of Yelena and Masterson before taken into vampire custody in the season one finale.
- Jonah Bishop (voiced by Carey Means, originally voiced by Korey Jackson, voiced by Spriggs Fryman as "Tony Stanza") is an intelligent archaeological professor who seems to be well-versed in Wayne Phenomena who does not take Team Timbers' efforts to investigate it seriously due to their age. Olly, in particular, seems to look up to him. He is also the masked figure that Team Timbers named "Tony Stanza", whose true identity they only learned. Jonah is revealed to be Yelena's husband in the second season.
- George (voiced by Dave Willis, originally voiced by Bill Lobley) is the Wayne's residential doorman who often seems oblivious to the Wayne Phenomenon, but remains friendly with Team Timbers and their associates.
- Julia Wiles (voiced by Nikki M. James) is the resident of the Wayne whom Ansi has a crush on. Olly and Saraline eventually warm up to each other despite their initial distrust. She is eventually revealed to be part of the Wayne's conspiracy while pretending to be a Norma.
- Clara Rhone (voiced by Harriett D. Foy) is the female chief librarian who runs the Wayne's secret library called the Stanza alongside Jonah's Tony Stanza alias. She befriends Ansi when he discovers it.
  - John Keats (voiced by Billy Bob Thompson) is a juvenile Squidgit who works at the Stanza and is befriended by Ansi. He was named after the English Romantic poet John Keats after stealing a book written by Keats from Ansi.
- Andrei (voiced by Andrew Rannells) is a Wayne resident who is a vampire suffering from amnesia as Team Timbers helps him recover his memories throughout the course of the first season. He eventually regains his memories as the Duke of Glamsterdam and leader of his people.
- The Arcsine/Annacile (voiced by Katie DiCicco) – Arcsine is the guardian spirit of the Wayne. In the second season, she is targeted by Prismal for her immense power. When she loses her power, she becomes a human named Annacile.
- Prismal (voiced by Kevin Conroy) is Yelena's cyborg superior in the Calliope organization who serves as the main antagonist of the second season. He moved into Yelena's apartment after the first-season finale.

== Episodes ==
Season	Episodes		Originally released		
Season	Episodes		First released	Last released	Network
Web series	6		November 14, 2014	December 26, 2014	Nick.com
1	20	9	July 24, 2017	September 21, 2017	Nickelodeon
1	20	11	October 15, 2018	October 26, 2018	Nicktoons
2	10		May 3, 2019	May 31, 2019	Nicktoons

== Production ==
For the web series, Matt Longoria, Bobb Barito, and others who were part of Beatstreet Productions worked as sound designers for each episode and coordinating it with dialogue, even adding in sound jokes from time to time. Some of these individuals worked on the TV series.

In April 2015, Nickelodeon ordered 20 episodes with an original premiere date of 2016, becoming the first Nick series to be based on a digital series.

Ego Plum was the show's music composer, while Billy Lopez worked with Michael Pecoriello as executive producers. Pecoriello said that he thought the show was a "perfect fit for the Nick brand because it really does see the world through the eyes of kids." Lopez also did the theme song for the series.

== Release ==
In August 2014, the web series debuted on Nick.com, with new episodes being released weekly. The six-episode web series followed the adventures of Olly Timbers and Ansi Molina. On July 24, 2017, the series premiered on Nickelodeon. Since October 15, 2018, new episodes moved to Nicktoons. On August 11, 2021, the series was added to Paramount+.

== Reception ==
Jennifer Walden of Post Magazine reviewed the web series as having "rapid-fire jokes, action, and plot-points" that cover as much ground as an episode that is 30 minutes long. The TV series was also well received. Emily Ashby of Common Sense Media gave the series 3 out of 5 stars; saying that, "Nonsensical, imaginative fun rules the day in this unpredictable animated series." But added that, "Welcome to the Wayne is best treated as a sugary-treat kind of addition to kids' media diets since the content is more about garnering laughs than it is about anything outright educational." Damon Cap of BSC Kids compared the series to Gravity Falls, adding that, after viewing the first episode, is "a lot of potential and excitement on who this is going to turn out." Cap added that once Ansi came across the library, they knew the show would be "good" and "great to watch." Television Business International said that the series kept the "hand-drawn art style" used in the web series, while "using innovative animation techniques to create a unique visual aesthetic." Peter Jurado of ComicsVerse said that the show takes you "back to the city" like Hey Arnold!, highlights the value of knowledge, and is unique in its own way, even though it has some similarities with Gravity Falls, as a "new mystery with a lot of heart." Jurado also praised the return to the 22-minute format and the fact that the characters are young enough that they don't "automatically judge somebody." Librarian Burkely Hermann argued that in this series, a "special and magnificent library" is central, going beyond positive depictions in recent years, with the chief librarian as a Black woman named Clara Rhone, voiced by Harriett D. Foy. This included episodes, he wrote, where "the issues of underfunded libraries and the value of knowledge," were central, as was the focus on librarians as gatekeepers, and others which made clear the value of librarians, and libraries, as "places of knowledge and diversity."

=== Accolades ===
Year	Award	Category	Nominee	Result	Source
2018	Daytime Emmy Awards	Outstanding Writing in an Animated Program	Welcome to the Wayne	Nominated	
2019	Daytime Emmy Awards	Outstanding Children's Animated Program	Welcome to the Wayne	Nominated	
