= All Growed Up =

- Rugrats episode
- Rugrats "All Growed Up" VHS front cover
- Episode no.: Season 8 Episode 24
- Directed by: Louie Del Carmen; Jim Duffy
- Written by: Kate Boutilier; Eryk Casemiro
- Original air date: July 21, 2001

Guest appearances
- Charlie Adler; Toran Caudell; Olivia Hack; Laraine Newman; Adrienne Frantz; David Bowe; Bettina

Episode chronology
← Previous "Talk of the Town"	Next → "A Rugrats Kwanzaa"

"All Growed Up" is a special episode of Rugrats and the pilot episode to the spin-off/sequel series All Grown Up! that aired on July 21, 2001, on Nickelodeon, to celebrate the series' tenth anniversary. The special serves as the 13th and 14th episodes of the seventh season of Rugrats, and the 143rd and 144th episodes of the series overall. The episode's premise was to focus on what the babies' lives would be like if they were ten years older. The episode proved to be popular enough for a series based on it to be made.

The episode was directed by Louie Del Carmen and Jim Duffy, and written by Kate Boutilier and Eryk Casemiro. In its original American broadcast, the episode was watched by 11,913,000 viewers, making it the most-watched and highest-rated telecast in the entire history of Nickelodeon.

== Plot ==
When the babies are watching a science fiction movie about a time-traveling machine, Angelica shows them her new "tapiyokie" (karaoke) machine. She forbids the babies to play with it, but they do. Angelica is angry and chases the babies into a closet, with Angelica on the outside. Tommy suggests they go to "the foocher" (the future) so that they will be grown up enough for Angelica not to boss them around anymore. The babies rig the karaoke machine into a time-travel device, and the babies see themselves in the future, ten years older.

The gang stumbles out of the closet, and teenage Angelica demands her CD of popstar Emica's songs back. They explain that they had borrowed the CD to learn the lyrics in hopes that Emica will call one of them up to sing with her during her concert the next night. Nine-year-old Dil is shown to have an unusual personality. Stu has a disco dance contest on the same night of the concert, and plans to wear his lucky zodiac necklace, one similar to Emica's.

When the gang leaves for middle school, Tommy, Dil, and Angelica's grandfather and Stu and Drew's father, Lou, is now a bus driver. Angelica's friend Samantha Shane, whom Chuckie has a crush on, tells Angelica that she is going to the Emica concert. Angelica denies being related to Tommy, and claims that she is going to wear the zodiac necklace that Emica (and Stu) wears. She asks Tommy to steal the necklace, offering to introduce Samantha to Chuckie in return. Tommy plans to ask Stu if he can borrow the necklace, but realizes it is easier said than done when Stu says he cannot dance without it. Tommy makes a fake necklace by wrapping a round dog biscuit in gold foil with the zodiac sign drawing and switches it out for the real necklace. Unexpectedly, the now old and overweight Spike eats the decoy overnight, then mistakes the real necklace for another one and takes it. Stu finds out the next morning, and Tommy takes the blame for stealing it. Stu and Didi ground Tommy from attending the Emica concert. Angelica finds out what happened and refuses to introduce Chuckie to Samantha.

Stu and Didi hire Susie to babysit Tommy while they are at the dance, as she is unable to attend the Emica concert. Lil finds the necklace in the sandbox, as Spike buried it there, and the gang convince a reluctant Tommy to come with them to return the necklace to Stu. Susie catches them as they leave the house, but eagerly goes with the gang. On the way, they ride their bikes by the concert, where Angelica runs towards them to get the necklace. Tommy confronts Angelica and tells her that he should not have agreed to their deal and urges her to tell the truth. Ultimately feeling remorse, Angelica admits to Samantha that the necklace belonged to Tommy's dad and that she and Tommy are cousins. She introduces Chuckie to Samantha as "Charlie Finster, III" and gives her concert ticket to Susie.

They return Stu's necklace in the middle of his performance. The kids head off to the concert, where Angelica decides to head home. Tommy offers to give Angelica his ticket as a thanks. As she declines, Lou arrives with two tickets: one was intended for his wife, Lulu, but he gives it to Angelica because she is away on a trip. At the concert, Emica calls Tommy up to sing, but Angelica begs to be up too, and Emica agrees. After a short period of singing (and flashbacks of clips from the entire gang's baby years), Angelica and Tommy start to fight over the microphone. They struggle to what seems as backstage, but travel back into the closet in the present day, where Angelica and the babies are fighting over the karaoke machine and end up breaking it. After Angelica yells at them for this, Tommy states he is glad that Angelica will be nicer to them in ten more years. The episode ends with Angelica chasing the babies and screaming for Didi as Chuckie asks Tommy if ten years will be a very long time.

== Home video releases ==
The special was released on VHS on August 7, 2001, paired with the Rugrats episode "My Fair Babies". Both episodes were later included as bonus episodes on the DVD version of the VHS/DVD All Grown Up!, released on August 26, 2003. The special was also included on the DVD Nick Picks: Vol. 2, released on October 18, 2005.

== Video game ==
Rugrats: All Growed-Up
- Publisher: THQ
- Platform: Microsoft Windows
- Release: NA: October 22, 2001; EU: October 4, 2002
- Genre: Adventure/Platform
- Mode: Single player

Rugrats: All Growed-Up is a 2001 single-player adventure platform game for the Microsoft Windows. It is inspired by the Rugrats tenth anniversary special and is the only Rugrats game that features the Rugrats as preteens. In it, the babies have been catapulted ten years into the future. The goal of the game is to find pieces of a time machine scattered around Dr. Spooky's castle in order to return home. The player can control Tommy Pickles, Chuckie Finster, Dil Pickles, or Kimi Finster, and Reptar, who is unlocked later in the game. Angelica provides narration for the game.
