= Post Minstrel Syndrome =

Studio album by the Negro Problem
- Released: 1997
- Genre: Alternative rock
- Label: Aerial Flipout
- Producer: Andrew Williams, The Negro Problem

The Negro Problem chronology
Post Minstrel Syndrome (1997)	Joys & Concerns (1999)

Post Minstrel Syndrome is the debut album by the American alternative rock band the Negro Problem, released in 1997.

== Production ==
The album was produced by Andrew Williams and the band, and recorded on an 8-track. It contains a cover of "MacArthur Park", with changed lyrics, as well as five unlisted songs. It was the frontman Stew's intention to make an album that sounded like his memory of the less-segregated AM radio of the late 1960s. The original lineup of the band broke up toward the end of the recording sessions. "Birdcage" criticizes the Los Angeles Times music critic Robert Hilburn.

== Critical reception ==
Professional ratings
Review scores
Source	Rating
AllMusic	4/5 stars
Entertainment Weekly	B+
Los Angeles Daily News	3/4 stars
The San Diego Union-Tribune	4/4 stars

Entertainment Weekly called the album "a wryly eccentric brand of white-bread pop laced with atmospheric keyboards, vibrant brass, and startling melodies." Phoenix New Times deemed it "a kinky mix of art-rock gambol and earthy balladry." Rolling Stone praised the "tart wit, sunshinedaydream melodicism and open-heart surge."

Trouser Press labeled the album "a joyous album of off-kilter pure pop." The Dayton Daily News stated: "Quirky yet infectious, this art-pop fits with Pere Ubu's relatively accessible albums circa 1990." The San Diego Union-Tribune considered Post Minstrel Syndrome to be the best debut album of 1997.

AllMusic wrote that the album "is like a breath of fresh air, a no-man's land where the politics and social vision of C.L.R. James meet Spike Lee in the home of Big Joe Turner's R&B, and primal, snaky rock & roll."

== Track listing ==
No.	Title	Length
1.	"Birdcage"
2.	"If You Would Have Traveled on the 93 North Today"
3.	"Submarine Down"
4.	"The Meaning of Everything"
5.	"Miss Jones"
6.	"Buzzing"
7.	"Doubting Uncle Tom"
8.	"Ghetto Godot"
9.	"The Great Leap Forward"
10.	"MacArthur Park"
11.	"2 Inch Dick Mobile"
12.	"Omegaville"
13.	"Witch"
