= The Cathedral School of St. John the Divine =

Private day school in New York City

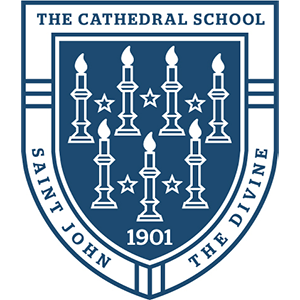

Location
- 1047 Amsterdam Ave; New York 10025 - 1702; United States; 40°48′14″N 73°57′46″W

Information
- School type: Private
- Religious affiliation: Episcopal
- Founded: 1901
- Head of school: Erica L. Corbin
- Faculty: 49
- Grades: K-8
- Enrollment: 250
- Student to teacher ratio: 5:1
- Campus size: 11 acres on the campus of the Cathedral of St. John the Divine
- Colors: Blue and White
- Mascot: Cougar
- Website: cathedralnyc.org

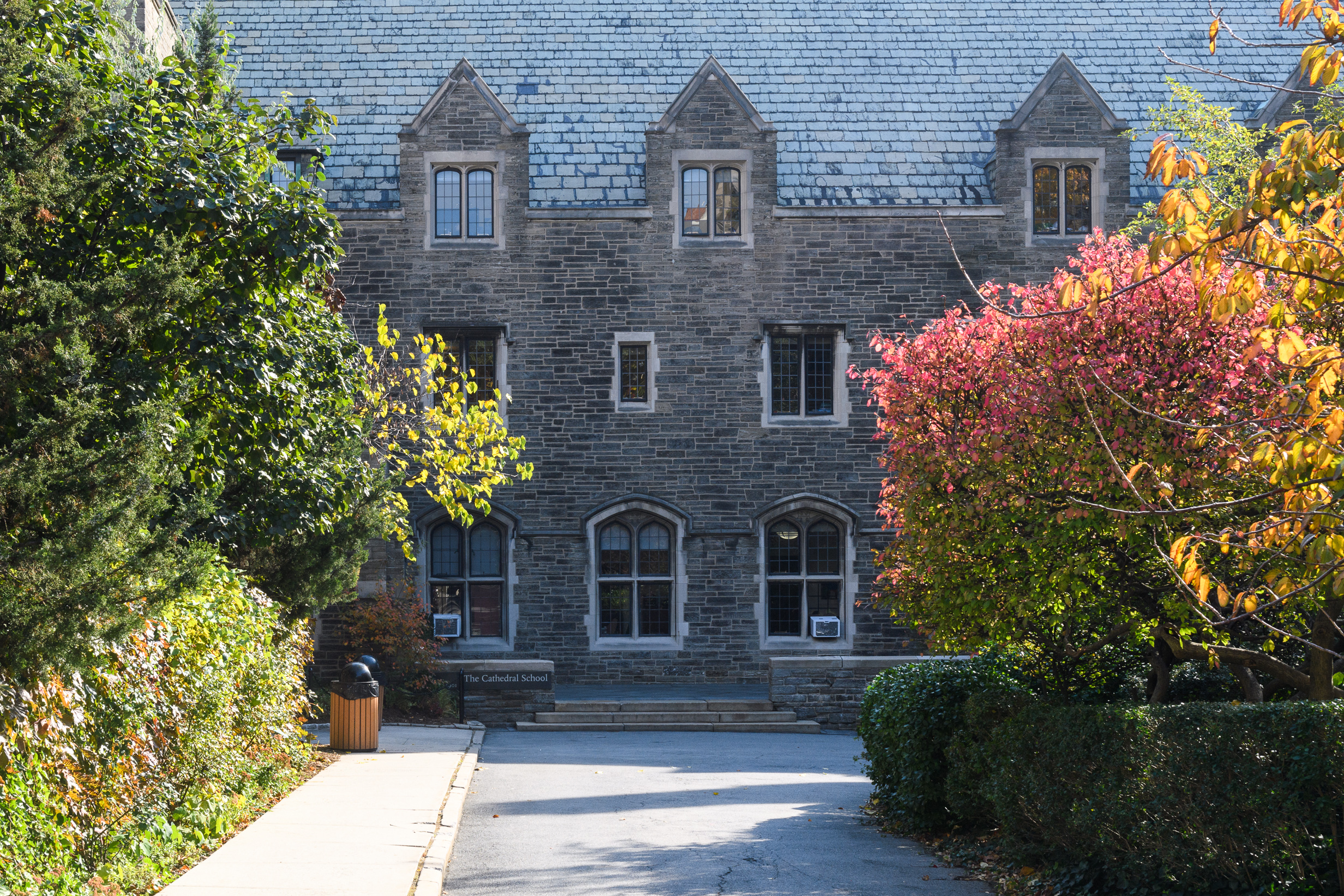
Front of the School

The Cathedral School of St. John the Divine is an independent, K-8 day school rooted in the Episcopal tradition, for students of all genders and all faiths located in Morningside Heights, Manhattan, New York City. Founded in 1901, it is located on the 11-acre campus of the Cathedral of St. John the Divine and has an enrollment of about 250 students. The School is divided into a Lower School (Grades K-4) and an Upper School (Grades 5–8).

== History ==
The choir school building, now the Cathedral School of St. John the Divine, is located on the eastern border of the cathedral close of St. John the Divine. The building is in the Collegiate Gothic style and is 4 1/2 stories tall. The exterior contains gray schist cladding and limestone trim, with architectural features such as a gabled roof, dormers protruding from the roof, and Tudor-style arched openings. Inside, the building contained classrooms; gathering space for reception, dining; music rooms; a library; a gymnasium; a dormitory; and masters’ and service rooms.

The choir school was created in 1901 within the Ithiel Town Building. A separate structure was first proposed in Walter Cook & Winthrop A. Welch's 1906 plan for the cathedral close. In January 1910, Mary Eliza Blodgett (also known as Mrs. J. Jarrett Blodgett) donated $25,000 toward the new school building's projected $150,000 cost, as a gift to honor her father John H. Sherwood. Blodgett later covered the rest of the choir school building's cost after no one else donated, while former choirboy Frederick G. Bourne provided a $500,000 endowment in 1914. Cathedral architect Ralph Adams Cram approved Cook & Welch's plan in January 1912 and filed construction plans that July, with work beginning that October. The school building was finished in September 1913. The choir school consisted of day school for 20 adult men and a boarding school for 40 choirboys who paid no tuition. A short-lived corporal punishment policy introduced in 1954 by headmaster Darby W. Betts caused a national uproar. The Cathedral School was turned into a boys' day school in 1964 and a coeducational day school for grades K-8 in 1972.

== Academics ==
The Cathedral School's Lower School includes kindergarten through 4th grade.

In Cathedral School's Upper School, grades 5th through 8th, students take progressively styled classes in English, math, science, social studies, world languages (Spanish or French), art, music and physical education. Latin is mandatory beginning in the sixth grade.

Students also learn coding, digital citizenship and online research skills through the dedicated technology curriculum.

STEAM (Science, Technology, Engineering, Art, and Math) is part of the daily academic curriculum at The Cathedral School.

== Athletics ==
The Cathedral School offers many sports through the fall, winter, and spring. Interscholastic sports include volleyball, soccer, cross country, basketball, track and field, tennis, softball, and baseball. More than 90% of Upper School students participate in at least one interscholastic sport per school year.

== Campus ==
Three peacocks, which were donated by the Bronx Zoo in the 1980s, lived on the grounds of The Cathedral School until early 2024.

The school holds an annual spring fair.

== Notable alumni ==
- Jon Abbott, CEO of WGBH Educational Foundation
- Burgess Meredith, actor
- Ben Stiller, actor
- Emma Straub, American novelist
- Isabel Leonard, Grammy award winner and American mezzo-soprano
- Bethany Donaphin, former WNBA star and current WNBA Head of League Operations
- John Gary, actor, famous for his rendition of Danny Boy, 1930s
- Alex Westerman, award-winning creative director based in Los Angeles.
- Wiki, record producer and rapper in Ratking

== Affiliated organizations ==
- National Association of Independent Schools
- New York State Association of Independent Schools
