= Stew (musician) =

American singer-songwriter (born 1961)

- Born: Mark Stewart; August 16, 1961 (age 65)
- Origin: Los Angeles, California, U.S.
- Occupations: Singer-songwriter, playwright

Mark Lamar Stewart (born August 16, 1961), known professionally as Stew, is an American singer-songwriter and playwright from Los Angeles, California. He is best known for "Gary's Song" from the SpongeBob SquarePants episode "Have You Seen This Snail?". He won the Tony Award for Best Book of a Musical for Passing Strange.

== Career ==
=== The Negro Problem ===
In the early 1990s, Stew formed a four-piece band called The Negro Problem. (Stew himself is Black.) In 1995 the band released a box set collection of singles including a cover of "MacArthur Park" and a multi-part pop operetta entitled "Miss Jones".

=== Solo career ===
Stew later went on to release albums under his own name. His 2000 release Guest Host was named Album of the Year by Entertainment Weekly and his 2002 album, The Naked Dutch Painter and Other Songs, repeated that feat. He toured in support of Love's Arthur Lee in 2002 and in 2003 he was invited to take part in the Lincoln Center's American Songbook series of concerts.

=== Theater and television ===
Starting in 2004, he began writing the book, lyrics and music (with Heidi Rodewald) for his semi-autobiographical rock musical Passing Strange, produced with the support of the Sundance Institute and The Public Theater, which won him the Drama Desk Award for Outstanding Lyrics. Also in 2004, he wrote and performed "Gary's Song" for the SpongeBob SquarePants episode "Have You Seen This Snail?(Where's Gary?)", which aired the following year, and is credited with giving him his first broadcast exposure. In 2006, he and Rodewald continued to produce Passing Strange as well as working on a film project with The Sundance Institute. Passing Strange had successful runs at the Berkeley Repertory Theatre in Berkeley, California, in the fall of 2006, and off-Broadway at The Public Theater in New York City during the spring of 2007. It received critical praise from both the New York Times and Variety and opened on Broadway at the Belasco Theatre in February 2008 under the aegis of producer Liz McCann and the Shubert Organization. The play garnered seven Tony nominations in 2008, with Stew receiving four nominations and winning the award for Best Book. The play closed in July 2008, with Spike Lee filming the final performances for a feature film which screened at the Sundance Festival in January 2009.

As of 2016, Stew, Rodewald and members of The Negro Problem were involved in their live show and accompanying album titled Notes from a Native Song, inspired by the writings of James Baldwin.

=== Harvard ===
Stew is Professor of the Practice of Musical Theater Writing at Harvard University.

== Discography ==
=== With The Negro Problem ===
- Post Minstrel Syndrome (1997)
- Joys & Concerns (1999)
- Welcome Black (2002)
- Blackboot (2003)
- Making It (2012)
- Total Bent (2018)
- Notes of a Native Song (2018)

=== As Stew ===
- Guest Host (2000)
- Sweetboot (2001)
- The Naked Dutch Painter and Other Songs (2002)
- Something Deeper Than These Changes (2003)
- Gary's Song (Gary Come Home) (2005)

=== With The Lullabies ===
- Lullabies' Lullaby (2003)

=== With Double Naught Spy Car + Stew ===
- Panorama City (2014)

=== As producer ===
- At Apogee (2004) by Mr. Smolin
- Poison of the Sea (2005) by Patria Jacobs
- The Crumbling Empire of White People (2007) by Mr. Smolin

== Awards and nominations ==
- Guest Host, 2000 Best Album of The Year, Entertainment Weekly
- The Naked Dutch Painter and Other Songs, 2002 Best Album of The Year, Entertainment Weekly
- Drama Desk Award for Best Musical – Passing Strange
- Drama Desk Award for Best Lyrics – Passing Strange
- Drama Desk Award for Best Music – Passing Strange
- Tony Award for Best Book – Passing Strange
- Tony Award Nomination for Best Musical – Passing Strange
- Tony Award Nomination for Best Actor in a Musical – Passing Strange
- Tony Award Nomination for Best Original Score (with Heidi Rodewald) – Passing Strange
- Tony Award Nomination for Best Orchestrations – Passing Strange
- Obie Award (with Heidi Rodewald) – Passing Strange
