= Best Day Ever =

- SpongeBob SquarePants episode
- Title card
- Episode no.: Season 4 Episode 20a
- Directed by: Larry Leichliter (animation); Nate Cash (storyboard); Tuck Tucker (storyboard); Alan Smart (supervising)
- Written by: Nate Cash; Tuck Tucker; Steven Banks
- Production code: 151-507
- Original air date: November 10, 2006

Episode chronology
← Previous "Squid Wood"	Next → "The Gift of Gum"
- SpongeBob SquarePants (season 4)

"Best Day Ever" is the first segment of the 20th episode of the fourth season of the American animated television series SpongeBob SquarePants, and the 80th episode overall. The episode was written by Nate Cash, Tuck Tucker, and Steven Banks, and the animation was directed by Larry Leichliter; Cash and Tucker also functioned as storyboard directors. It originally aired on Nickelodeon in the United States on November 10, 2006.

In the episode, SpongeBob is determined to have a perfect day, which, to his disappointment, does not go as he planned. Each of his friends has a different problem of their own, so he sets out to help them while spoiling his own agendas.

The episode features a song titled "The Best Day Ever" written by Tom Kenny and Andy Paley. A soundtrack album, SpongeBob SquarePants: The Best Day Ever, was released on September 12, 2006. "Best Day Ever" pulled an average of 6.7 million viewers upon release. The song was actually used two years earlier in the credits of The SpongeBob SquarePants Movie.

== Plot ==
At the end of the episode, SpongeBob performs a musical about his "best day ever"

SpongeBob's "Best Day Ever" fails to turn out as he planned when he is forced to postpone his activities to help his friends with various problems. He wanted to work at the Krusty Krab, but it is condemned because of a nematode infestation. SpongeBob tries to get the nematodes to leave but they eat his pants instead. So SpongeBob inadvertently lures the nematodes away using his nose as a flute. Then, he planned to practice some karate with Sandy, but she is unable to because there is a leak in her treedome. SpongeBob thinks it's a trap and attacks her anyway. Sandy hits him and sends him flying up high toward the ceiling, stopping the leak. The scene cuts to SpongeBob walking to Jellyfish Fields. He sees Patrick frolicking but he ends up breaking his net, so SpongeBob gives him his old net, which quickly breaks as well. When Patrick wanted his new high-tech net, SpongeBob tries to tell him that it belongs to him but ends up giving to him. SpongeBob waits impatiently to use the net and tries to tell Patrick that it is his turn now, but Patrick doesn't hear him and keeps on playing with the jellyfish net, so he decides to leave for his last planned activity.

Then the scene cuts to SpongeBob walking at night to Squidward's clarinet recital. However, once he meets up with Squidward, he says that he cannot play in the concert because the reed of his clarinet is shot. Determined not to miss out on this activity as he had done with the other ones, SpongeBob pulls out one of his teeth to replace the reed. SpongeBob attempts to enter the building, but the usher refuses to let him in unless he has a ticket. He tries various methods of sneaking in, but at last he is let in because he is on the VIP list (Mrs. Puff said his name when she found him hiding in her purse in one attempt).

SpongeBob gets in right as the concert ends until he finally snaps and has a freak-out. He runs up to the stage and rips open the curtain, yelling, "NO! It is NOT over!" He grabs the microphone to give an elaborate speech about how his "Best Day Ever" is a disaster. However, Mr. Krabs, Patrick, Sandy and Squidward tell him about how he helped them with their problems and that they themselves were what his "Best Day Ever" was actually about. To make it up to him, they hold a production in which SpongeBob performs his song, "Best Day Ever", to complete his day with Patrick, Sandy, Squidward, and Mr. Krabs co-starring along in it. A few hours later, SpongeBob is still singing, but his friends are tired and sleepy, and the audience has all disappeared. When Squidward asks Mr. Krabs how long they have to keep up the performance, Mr. Krabs replies, "Just 'til his little heart gives out, Squidward. Just 'til his little heart gives out."

== Production ==
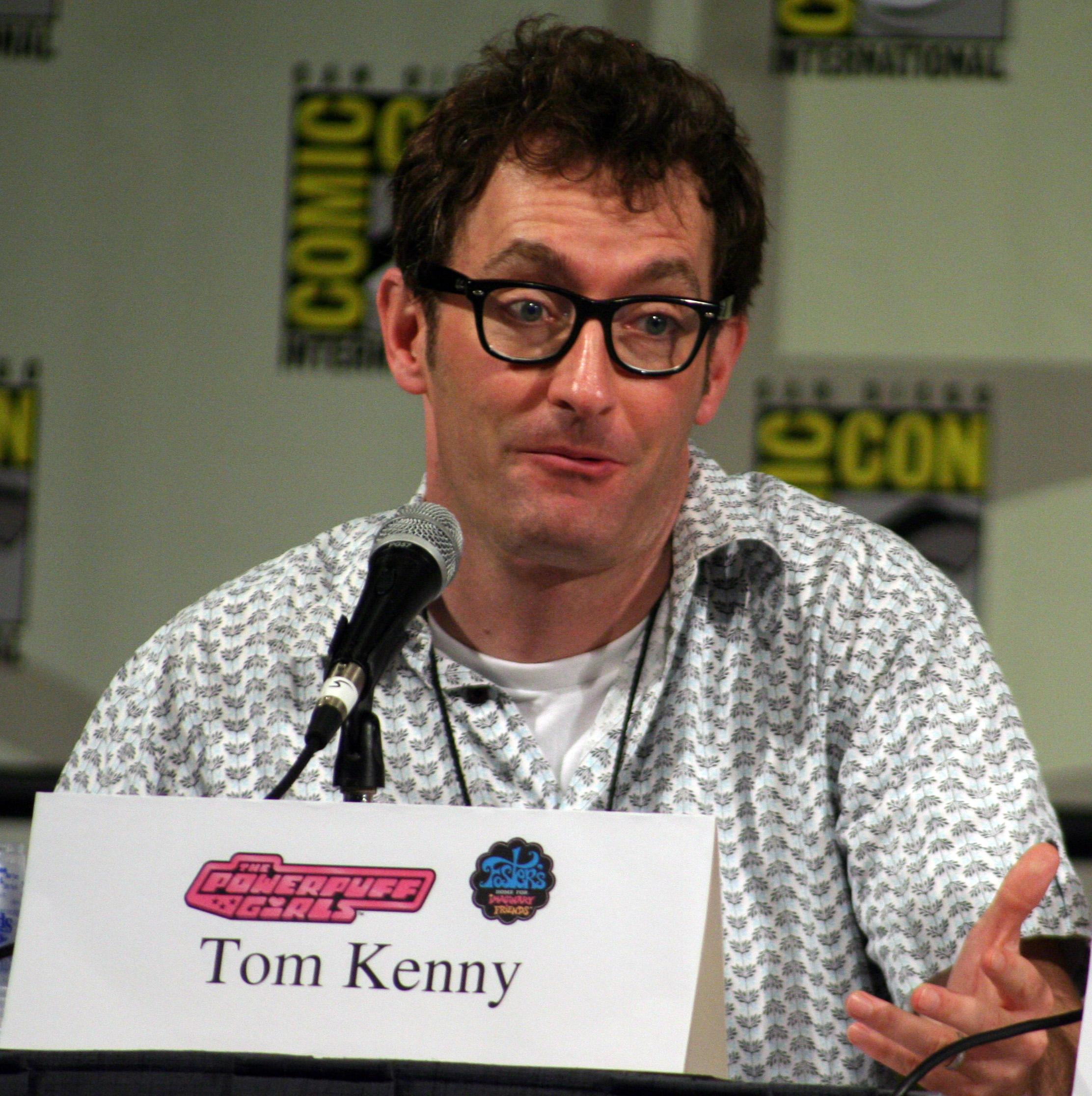
Tom Kenny co-wrote the song "The Best Day Ever"

"Best Day Ever" was written by Nate Cash, Tuck Tucker and Steven Banks, with Larry Leichliter serving as animation director. Cash and Tucker also functioned as storyboard directors. The episode originally aired on Nickelodeon in the United States on November 10, 2006.

The featured song "The Best Day Ever" was composed by Tom Kenny, SpongeBob's voice actor, and Andy Paley. The song was originally a part of The SpongeBob SquarePants Movie soundtrack that was released on November 9, 2004. Originally, Kenny and Paley were writing the songs "The Best Day Ever" and "Under My Rock" on what would become The Best Day Ever album. However, at the same time, the team of the 2004 feature film needed two extra filler tracks for the film soundtrack. Eventually, Stephen Hillenburg, the series creator and director of the film, heard the songs and decided to put it on the film's soundtrack. Although not originally intended for the film, "The Best Day Ever" was played during the closing credits.

The episode was part of the 24-hour SpongeBob marathon, "The Best Day Ever Marathon". Starting at 8 pm EDT, the event counted down the best 100 episodes of the series as chosen by viewers on Nick.com and TurboNick. Tom Ascheim, the executive vice president and general manager for Nickelodeon Television, said "We've received a tremendous response from almost 4 million fans who have voted online for their favorite SpongeBob episodes and we'll reward them with our biggest SpongeBob event ever." The marathon led up to the premiere of this episode. The marketing method was primarily organised by Frank Tanki. Ascheim explained that Nickelodeon uses modern technology to generate interest in television shows. He believes that allowing viewers to choose the episodes shown contributes to the show's high ratings.

Best Buy stores across the United States introduced a "Best Day Ever"-themed Best Buy gift card that doubles as a DVD-ROM packed with music videos, video game previews and more. In addition, "Best Day Ever"-themed activities were held at the Nickelodeon Family Suites Hotel by Holiday Inn including a themed party called the Bikini Bottom Bash. Throughout the month of November, the hotel released a "Best Day Ever" package to its guests starting at $369. TY released a Beanie Baby based on the album exclusively at Best Buy stores across the United States.

"Best Day Ever" was included in the SpongeBob SquarePants: Season 4, Vol. 2 DVD on January 9, 2007. The "Best Day Ever" shorts called "A Random Act of SpongeBob" were released as a bonus feature on the DVD. The shorts are "Crossing the Street", "Anything for Baby", "Flowers for Sandy", "Me Money", and "Pie". On September 22, 2009, "Best Day Ever" was released in the SpongeBob SquarePants: The First 100 Episodes DVD, alongside all the episodes of seasons one through five.

== Ratings ==
On Friday, November 10, 2006, an average of 4.4 million viewers tuned in between 6:30 AM and 10PM EDT to watch "The Best Day Ever Marathon". The marathon earned the network its most-watched and highest-rated total programming day in its history, averaging 1.9/4.4 million total viewers. The premiere of the "Best Day Ever" special attracted 6.7 million total viewers, with an average of 12.0/4.0 million kids 2–11, 12.8/2.6 million kids 6–11, according to Nielsen data.

The "SpongeBob Best Day Ever" online game, went live on November 9. It generated 1.3 million gameplay sessions and more than 867,000 unique visitors in three days. The full-length music video for "Best Day Ever" generated more than 1.4 million streams, with 471,000 unique visitors, making it the No. 2 video on TurboNick from November 6 to 12. During the same time period, "Best Day Ever"'s promotion video on TurboNick had 370,000 streams and was ranked within the top 10 videos of the broadband channel.
