= Nick.com =

Website owned and developed by Nickelodeon

- Website type: Children's
- Available in: English
- Owner: Nickelodeon
- Parent: Nickelodeon Group
- Website: www.nick.com
- Commercial: No
- Registration: No Longer Required
- Launched: October 1995; 31 years ago (as America Online channel)
- Current status: Open

Nick.com is a website owned and developed by Nickelodeon. The website currently serves as an online portal for Nickelodeon content, and offered online games, video streaming, radio streaming and individual websites for each show it broadcasts. It previously promoted the Nick mobile app which replaced it (websites for its sister networks were not affected). Nick.com has received positive critical reaction and various awards, including a Webby in 2003. It has also received positive reviews because of the steps taken by the website to protect user privacy. Visits to the domain outside the United States are redirected to YTV in Canada, Nick.de (the website's German version) in Germany or to Nick.com's global section due to programming licensing issues between territories.

== History ==
Nickelodeon launched their first online component as part of the America Online Kids Only channel in October 1995. Within a few years, a regular World Wide Web site came online, and became a strong promotional tool for Nickelodeon. The website's popularity grew and in March 1999, Nick.com became the highest rated website for children aged six to fourteen years old. Nickelodeon used the website in conjunction with television programmes which increased traffic. Nick.com also maintained a high level of respect for user privacy during the growth of the website.

Before 2000, Nick.com's design was mainly images and image maps allowing navigation through the website. Then, in June 2000, the website was expanded and redesigned with Flash-animated buttons and advertisements. Nick.com's design has changed repeatedly since then, with the website's later designs making use of sidebars, web banners, and Adobe Flash.

In January 2000, developers started discussing expansion of Nick.com to make it an even more desirable website for children to visit. Mike Skagerlind, the website's general manager at the time said "But we felt strongly that it could be a lot more. We basically wanted it to be the main place that kids go to on the Web." On June 4, 2000, the website was redesigned. The interface was revamped and to make it more appealing to children and the most significant development was the use of Flash for animated graphics and buttons.

On September 28, 2009, Nickelodeon revamped the site with the institution of the new logo.

Nick.com logo used from 2009 to 2014

Nick.com logo used from 2014 to 2023 (same as the main logo)

In July 2014, Nickelodeon completely redesigned the site to match with the Nickelodeon app. It did not affect its sister channels' websites.

In order to comply more with COPPA, Nickelodeon removed the ability to create an account on March 31, 2016. The message boards were closed the same day. The Nicktoons website also shut down around this time, replacing it with a page asking visitors to go to Nick.com.

In December 2018, access via desktop computer to most sections of the site became limited, as links to watch episodes and play games on the site all redirected to a page asking viewers to download the network's mobile and tablet apps (both the network's app, along with separate game apps) for access to games and programming instead. Nick.com also discontinued making online games. This is likely due to Google Chrome's changes that made access to Adobe Flash (which the site was built on for years) difficult to non-existent in line with Flash's discontinuation during the end of 2020, requiring a large-scale rebuild of the desktop site that cannot be done behind the scenes. It is possible that access to programming and games for desktop visitors could be restored in some point in the near future, with all elements having full compatibility with HTML5 standards. Production and distribution for Nickelodeon online games continued internationally until 2021. The last known Nickelodeon web game made before the redesign was "The Great Nickelodeon Escape".

On December 17, 2020, the ability to watch full episodes on Nick.com was restored for pay TV subscribers in the United States, where one must sign in to their TV provider to watch.

On August 31, 2022, Nickelodeon restored access to online games on Nick.com after nearly four years, replacing all advertisements for mobile apps on the games section of the website. There were ten games available on Nick.com when access to online games was restored, including "Nickelodeon Lanes", a bowling game made in 2021, but was never officially released in America until this change to the website.

The website was remodeled in 2023 with updated looks with the new 2023 logo change.

On July 29, 2024, Nickjr.com was closed in order for a remodel of the main Nick.com website, with Nick Jr. becoming a section on Nick.com.

On February 12, 2025, the international websites (except the UK, German, Latin American, Brazilian, Arabian, Indian, Canadian and Italian websites) were closed in favor of the Global page on this website.

== Features ==
=== Games ===
In 2001, Nickelodeon partnered with Networks Inc. to provide broadband video games for rent from Nick.com. The move was a further step in the multimedia direction that the developers wanted to take the website. Skagerlind indicated that over 50% of Nick.com's audience are using a high speed connection which allows them to expand the gaming options on the website.

On January 6, 2006, Nickelodeon launched New Game of the Week, which was a service that showcased an Adobe Flash game based on Nickelodeon content. The first New Game of the Week was Jimmy Timmy Power Hour 2: Co-Pilot Chaos, based on Jimmy Neutron from The Adventures of Jimmy Neutron, Boy Genius and Timmy Turner from The Fairly OddParents. When the service was launched, Nick.com had over 228 million game plays in the same fiscal quarter, which was partially attributed to New Game of the Week. A new game was showcased every Friday. A year-end version of The New Game of the Week regularly featured their SpongeBob games, such as "Bikini Bottom Bust Up", "Dunces and Dragons", "Invasion of the Lava King", and more. Access to the online games was removed in December 2018, but was somewhat restored in August 2022.

Following the closure of Nickjr.com for a Nick.com refresh, 25 games from Nick Jr.'s website were added onto Nickelodeon's website.

=== Videos and episodes ===
Nick.com provided streaming videos of full or partial Nickelodeon episodes. The service was originally launched as TurboNick, a popup panel showcasing broadband content such as video clips and games. It was then revamped and relaunched on July 1, 2005, as a sister website for Nick.com. The new website expanded on clips and content on Nick.com to provide full length Nickelodeon television shows. The United States service was again revamped in 2009 and began focusing exclusively on content from Nickelodeon's current schedule. With the ubiquitousness of online streaming, TurboNick branding was also discontinued at this time.

Along with the website's redesign in July 2014, Nickelodeon introduced its first web-exclusive series, Welcome to the Wayne. Citing changes in viewer preferences, the series served as the beginning of a push to create content that can exist on multiple platforms such as online, through mobile devices, as well as television. At the same time, amid declining ratings in its third season on television, Nickelodeon removed airings of the series The Legend of Korra on the primary Nickelodeon network and shifted its distribution to online outlets, where the show had proven to be much more successful. Moving the series to online distribution from outlets such as Nick.com and third-party outlets such as Amazon Video, Google Play, Xbox Video (later Microsoft Movies & TV) and Hulu reflected what series creator Michael DiMartino called a "sea change" in the industry: While Korra did not fit in well with Nickelodeon's other programming, the series did extremely well online, with the season 2 finale having been Nickelodeon's biggest online event. Following the remainder of its third season, season four of The Legend of Korra premiered in the United States on October 3, 2014, exclusively through online distribution. Along with the Nick App, access to full episodes requires a TV Everywhere log in.

Nick.com in the UK did not offer the same ability to watch entire episodes, but offered short clips from Nickelodeon shows instead. Episodes and videos are available on Nick.com in the US and the videos and episodes were also available on the Nick app before its closure in January 2024.

=== Radio ===
Logo for Nick Radio, combining iconography from both Nickelodeon and iHeartRadio.

Nick.com streamed Nick Radio, a radio network launched on September 30, 2013, in partnership with iHeartMedia (then called Clear Channel Communications). The network was also distributed through the iHeartRadio web platform and mobile app as well as New York City radio station WHTZ as a secondary HD channel. Nick Radio focused on Top 40 music (aimed towards the network's target audience of children and adolescents, with radio edits of some songs incorporated due to inappropriate content), along with celebrity interview features. In addition to regular on-air DJs, Nick Radio also occasionally featured guest DJ stints by stars from Nickelodeon's original series. Nick Radio was quietly discontinued in July 2019.

=== Shows ===
Nick.com maintains informational pages on Nickelodeon's current programming lineup. Although the content for each program page included games, videos, and episodes that could be accessed through other parts of the site, show pages can also included show photos and character breakdowns.

== Former features ==
=== Nicktropolis ===
Nicktropolis was a massively multiplayer online role-playing game provided by Nickelodeon on Nick.com. It was a virtual community that used isometric 3D graphics. It allowed users to play games, watch video clips and explore locations based on Nickelodeon television shows. Construction of Nicktropolis began in November 2004, by Nickelodeon's developers Mark Zadroga, Alex Westerman, Deborah Levine, Patrick Dorey, Sean McEvoy, and Jason Root. The game used the TheoSDK and TheoAvatarSDK engines. An alpha of the game was released in early 2006. The first beta was released in June 2006. From August 18, 2006, to January 6, 2007, the game was closed to the general public. Prior to this release, almost 3,000,000 children had tested the game. The service was finally launched to the public on January 30, 2007.

Following the official launch of the service, additional improvements were made. In March 2007, the game was remodeled and given a new logo, and on May 11, 2007, the home page was remodeled to fit in with Nick.com's new look. On June 24, 2007, the game was featured in The New York Times, with a quote stating, "Pre-teenage viewers have a virtual playground to call their own." In September 2007, the "Nicktropolis Newsletter" was launched, as an e-mail service to players, and in November 2007, the service became ad-supported. By July 3, 2008, Nicktropolis had over 7,000,000 registered users. That same year, the service introduced daily events on weekdays, the "Nicktropolis Blog" on the Nick.com message boards, and a new area to support The Big Green Help, Nickelodeon's environmental campaign at the time.

The game received positive ratings in terms of appropriateness for children, with mixed critical reviews. The service was redesigned as The Club on May 19, 2010. The Club later closed in September 2014.

=== Nick Arcade ===
Nick Arcade (sharing a name with, but otherwise unrelated to, the game show of the same name) was a series of games that could be downloaded from Nick.com. It allowed users to play any game before buying it. Nick Arcade games were also featured on Nickelodeon's sister website, Shockwave.

=== Message boards ===
Nick.com offered a moderated Internet forum called the Message Boards. On the boards, kids posted threads and replied on topics based on Nickelodeon content. Emoticons were represented with icon GIFs. Notable Moderators were called NICKFrog and NICKPhilly.

Along with the redesigned Nick.com, the Message Boards were completely redesigned to match with it in 2014. The message boards were then closed on March 31, 2016, after Nick.com removed the option to sign up as a user on the site.

== Reception ==
The critical reaction for Nick.com has been generally positive, winning numerous awards.

The website has received two awards from the Broadcast Designers Association, getting a bronze award in 2001 and a silver in 2002. In 2003, Nick.com received a Judge's Choice Webby in the Television section. In 1999, Nick.com received the first Internet privacy seal from BBBOnline, a subsidiary of CBBB that assesses privacy issues online.
