= List of SpongeBob SquarePants guest stars =

Guest star list for an animated series

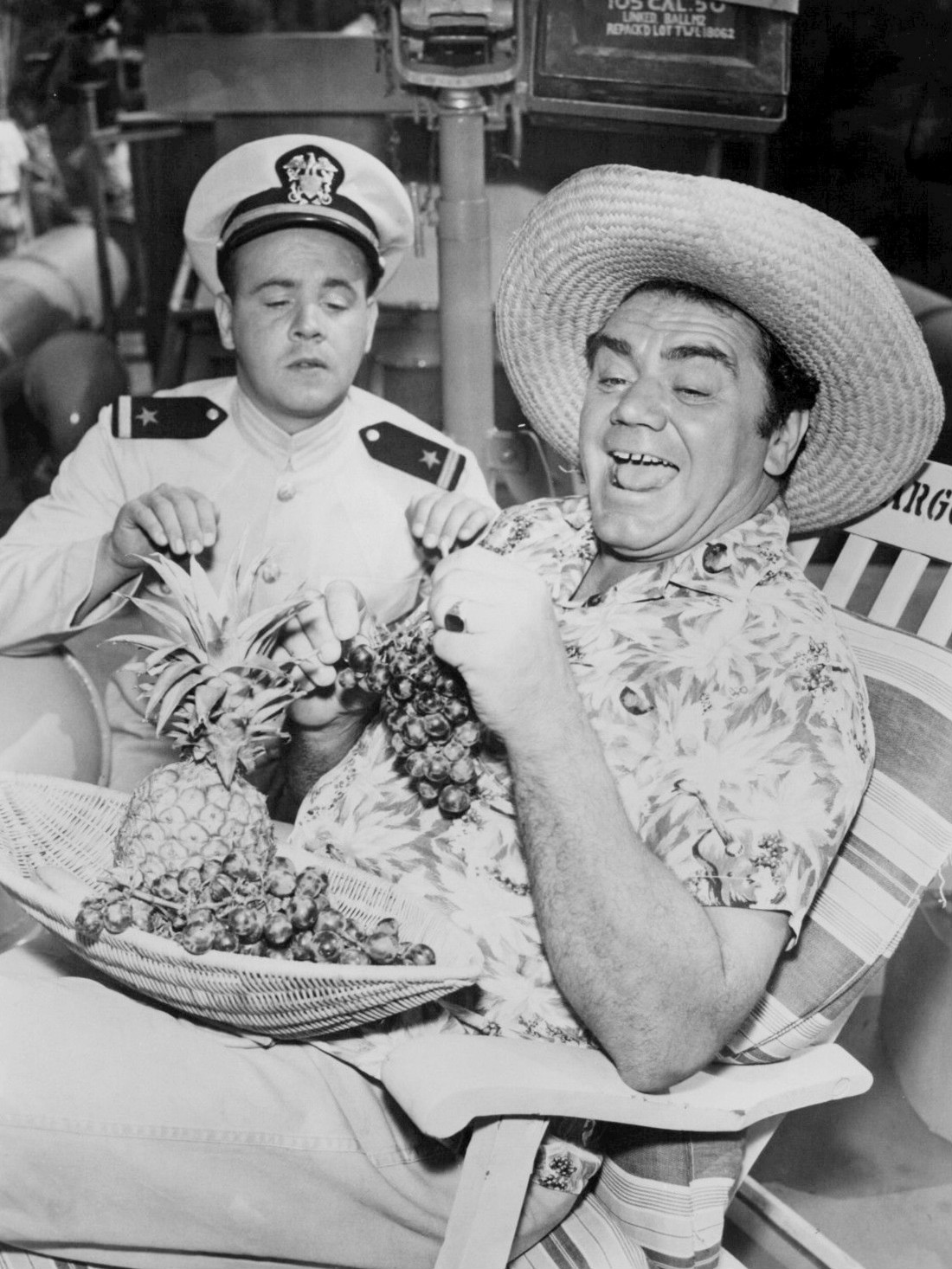
McHale's Navy actors Ernest Borgnine (right) and Tim Conway (left), shown here in 1962, were the first credited guest stars. Borgnine made the most guest appearances on the show, appearing in 16 episodes before his death.

In addition to the show's regular cast of voice actors, guest stars have been featured on SpongeBob SquarePants, an American animated television series created by marine biologist and animator Stephen Hillenburg for Nickelodeon. SpongeBob SquarePants chronicles the adventures and endeavors of the title character and his various friends in the fictional underwater city of Bikini Bottom. Many of the ideas for the show originated in an unpublished, educational comic book titled The Intertidal Zone, which Hillenburg created in the mid-1980s. He began developing SpongeBob SquarePants into a television series in 1996 upon the cancellation of Rocko's Modern Life, which Hillenburg directed. The pilot episode first aired on Nickelodeon in the United States on May 1, 1999. The show's thirteenth season premiered in 2020, and 331 episodes of SpongeBob SquarePants have aired. A series of theatrical films based on the show began in 2004 with The SpongeBob SquarePants Movie.

Guest voices have come from many ranges of professions, including actors, athletes, authors, musicians, and artists. The first credited guest stars were McHale's Navy actors Ernest Borgnine and Tim Conway, who appeared in "Mermaid Man and Barnacle Boy (I)", the show's sixth episode. Borgnine and Conway have since been featured as recurring characters on the show until 2012. Rock band Ghastly Ones were the first guest stars to appear as themselves, appearing for a special musical performance in the first-season episode "Scaredy Pants". Aside from the aforementioned actors, actress Marion Ross has a recurring role as Grandma SquarePants, SpongeBob's grandmother. Borgnine has made the most appearances, guest starring 16 times. Conway has made 15 guest appearances, while Ross has appeared four times, John O'Hurley appeared three times, and John Rhys-Davies has appeared twice. Michael McKean has also appeared twice, voicing different characters.

Hillenburg "deliberately avoided" inviting guest stars onto the show, saying that "we only would cast someone if they came right out of the story." A number of guest stars agreed to appear on the show after being convinced by their children who are SpongeBob SquarePants fans, while others accept because they are fans of the show themselves. Casting associate Sarah Noonan, who is responsible for casting guest stars on the show, has received three Artios Award nominations (with one win) from the Casting Society of America. As of May 4, 2016, there have been 78 guest stars on the show,^{[A]} with this figure rising to 84 if The SpongeBob SquarePants Movie and its sequels are included.

== Overview and history ==
Guest stars have appeared on SpongeBob SquarePants since its first season, in addition to the main cast, consisting of Tom Kenny, Bill Fagerbakke, Rodger Bumpass, Clancy Brown, Mr. Lawrence, Jill Talley, Carolyn Lawrence, Mary Jo Catlett and Lori Alan. Series creator Stephen Hillenburg in point of fact eschewed appearances by celebrities on the show, stating in an early interview, "Honestly, I deliberately avoided that. The Simpsons is a tough act to follow, so I thought it was best not to do what they do," referring to the copious number of The Simpsons guest stars. He added, "But we've had a few exceptions." According to Tom Kenny, main character SpongeBob's voice actor, "One of the things networks always try to push is getting celebrities." He said, "But Steve [Hillenburg] had no interest in that and let them know that in no uncertain terms."

The first guest stars to appear on the show were actors Ernest Borgnine and Tim Conway, reuniting for their first joint TV project in 33 years since the 1960s sitcom McHale's Navy. They appeared as SpongeBob's favorite superheroes, Mermaid Man and Barnacle Boy, respectively. Hillenburg and Derek Drymon, the show's creative director, enjoyed the actors' roles in McHale's Navy, and they already wanted the two to provide the voices of Mermaid Man and Barnacle Boy when they were voice casting. Hillenburg and Drymon directly approached Borgnine and Conway, and the actors both accepted. When coming up for the right voice of Mermaid Man, Borgnine cracked his voice by mistake when he was saying "evil!" He said, "By golly! We started something... and we kept [the voice] in." Rock band Ghastly Ones were the first guest stars to appear as themselves, appearing to perform the song "SpongeBob ScaredyPants" in the first-season episode "Scaredy Pants." Their song was then released in the album SpongeBob SquarePants: Original Theme Highlights in 2001. Actors Jim Jarmusch and John Lurie were the first guest stars to appear in live-action. They appeared as themselves in the first-season episode "Hooky" via stock footage from the television program Fishing with John. According to episode writer Vincent Waller, "Someone made us aware of the footage, and they graciously let us use it." The crew planned to film live-action scenes; however, "the Jarmusch and Lurie addition was a very nice surprise."

Several guest stars have made multiple appearances on the show. Borgnine guest starred in 16 episodes, more than anybody else. He voiced Mermaid Man, until his death in 2012. Following his death, Nickelodeon honored him with a two-hour SpongeBob SquarePants marathon featuring his character. Borgnine had found a renewed fanbase among children through his work on the show. Borgnine's former McHale's Navy co-star Conway has made over 15 guest appearances as Barnacle Boy, Mermaid Man's sidekick. Actress Marion Ross first appeared as Grandma SquarePants in the season two episode "Grandma's Kisses," and has since appeared in three other episodes. Actor John O'Hurley provides the voice of King Neptune, who first appeared in the first-season episode "Neptune's Spatula," while John Rhys-Davies made his first appearance as Man Ray, Mermaid Man and Barnacle Boy's nemesis, in the second-season episode "Mermaid Man and Barnacle Boy III." The two have each reappeared in "The Clash of Triton" and "Mermaid Man and Barnacle Boy V," respectively. Other repeat guest stars include Brad Abrell, Steve Kehela and Frank Welker.

Hillenburg said that "We only would cast someone if they came right out of the story," while Sarah Noonan, vice president of talent and casting for Nickelodeon, said that guest star choices come from the writing staff and executive producer. Writer Steven Banks said, "It's not just stunt casting to get publicity," and that the reasoning is "[we] do want to meet them [...]" A number of guest stars have accepted to appear on the show after being persuaded by their children who are SpongeBob SquarePants fans. Some of them include Victoria Beckham, Amy Poehler and David Hasselhoff. Others accept to guest appear because they are fans of the show themselves. Actor Johnny Depp, who appeared as Jack Kahuna Laguna in the sixth-season episode "SpongeBob SquarePants vs. The Big One," accepted the guest role on the show because he and his children are fans. Hillenburg described the process, "In the beginning, it was hard to get people. Most of the people that allow themselves to be on have kids who like the show. Often, their kids are fans. They're doing it because they want to please the family." SpongeBob SquarePants has a "dream list" of celebrities that the crew would like to appear on the show, which includes actors Michael Caine and Jerry Lewis. Noonan said, "Let us know if you can help us out with them."

Many guest stars record their parts in the show's recording studio, although some are recorded over the telephone. Kenny joked, "With movie stars, sometimes they have to phone it in from their villa in France." When recording over the phone, some guest stars would do their parts in real time with the show's cast who are in the recording studio. Noonan received three Artios Award nominations from the Casting Society of America for her work on casting actors on the show. She was honored in 2011 in the Outstanding Achievement in Casting—Television Animation category. As of May 4, 2016, there have been 78 guest stars, totaling 117 guest spots.^{[A]} These figures rise to 84 and 123 respectively if The SpongeBob SquarePants Movie and The SpongeBob Movie: Sponge Out of Water are included.

== Guest stars ==
Key

- A double dagger (‡) denotes recurring guest stars.
- The color of the season number in the first column corresponds to the color of that season's DVD boxset.
- In the No. column:
  - The first number refers to the order it aired during the entire series.
  - The second number refers to the episode number within its season.
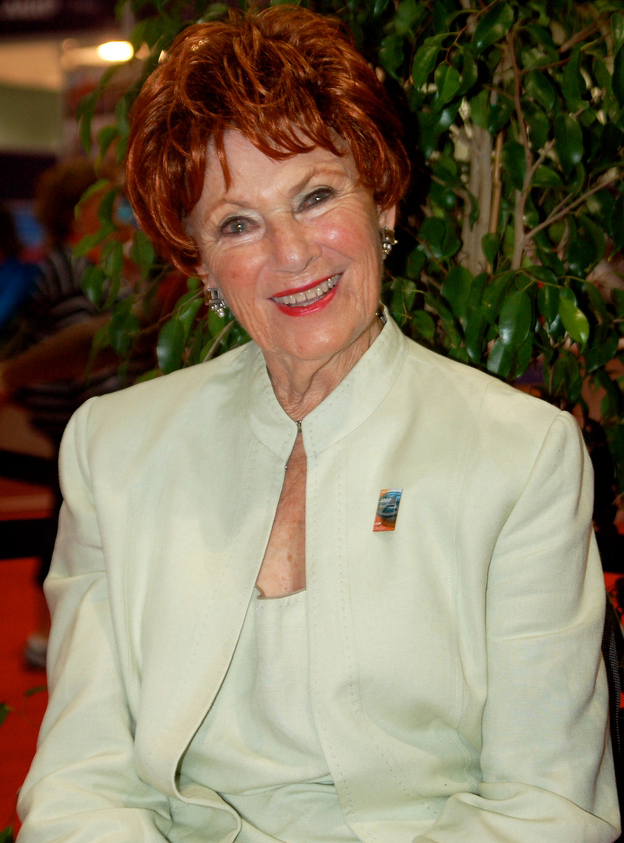
Actress Marion Ross has guest starred on the show as Grandma SquarePants four times.

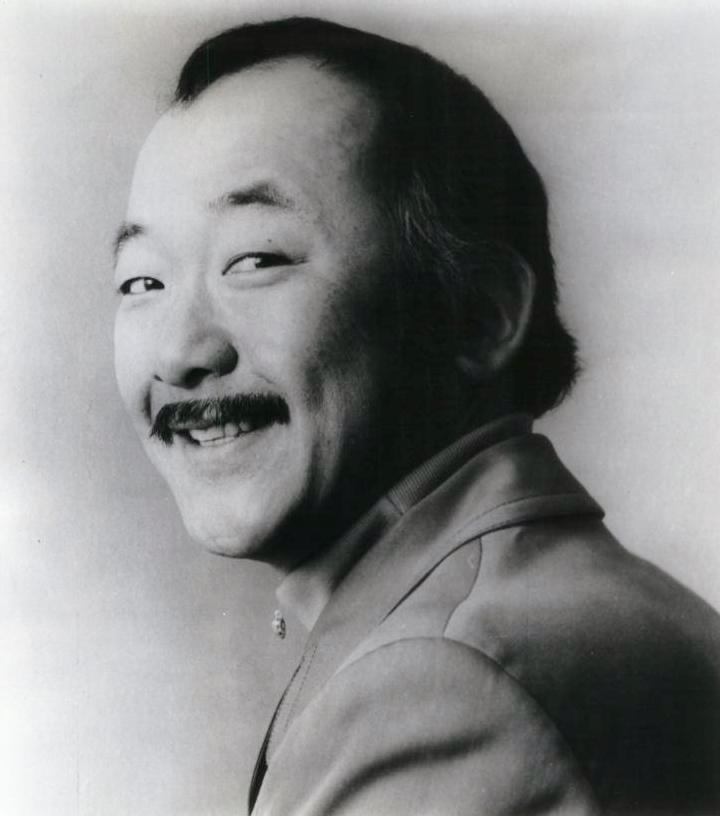
Actor Pat Morita voiced Master Udon in the episode "Karate Island"; Morita died before the episode aired, and the program was dedicated in his memory.

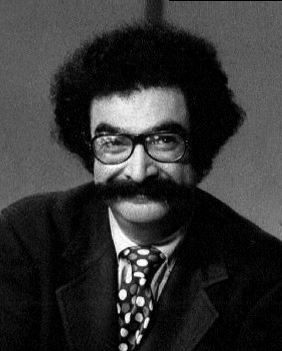
Film critic Gene Shalit, shown here in 1973, provided the voice of Gene Scallop, his "[fish-]likeness," in "The Krusty Sponge."

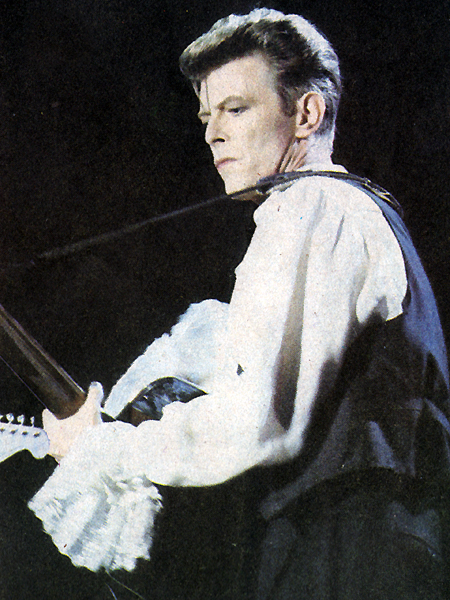
"Atlantis SquarePantis" featured musician David Bowie.

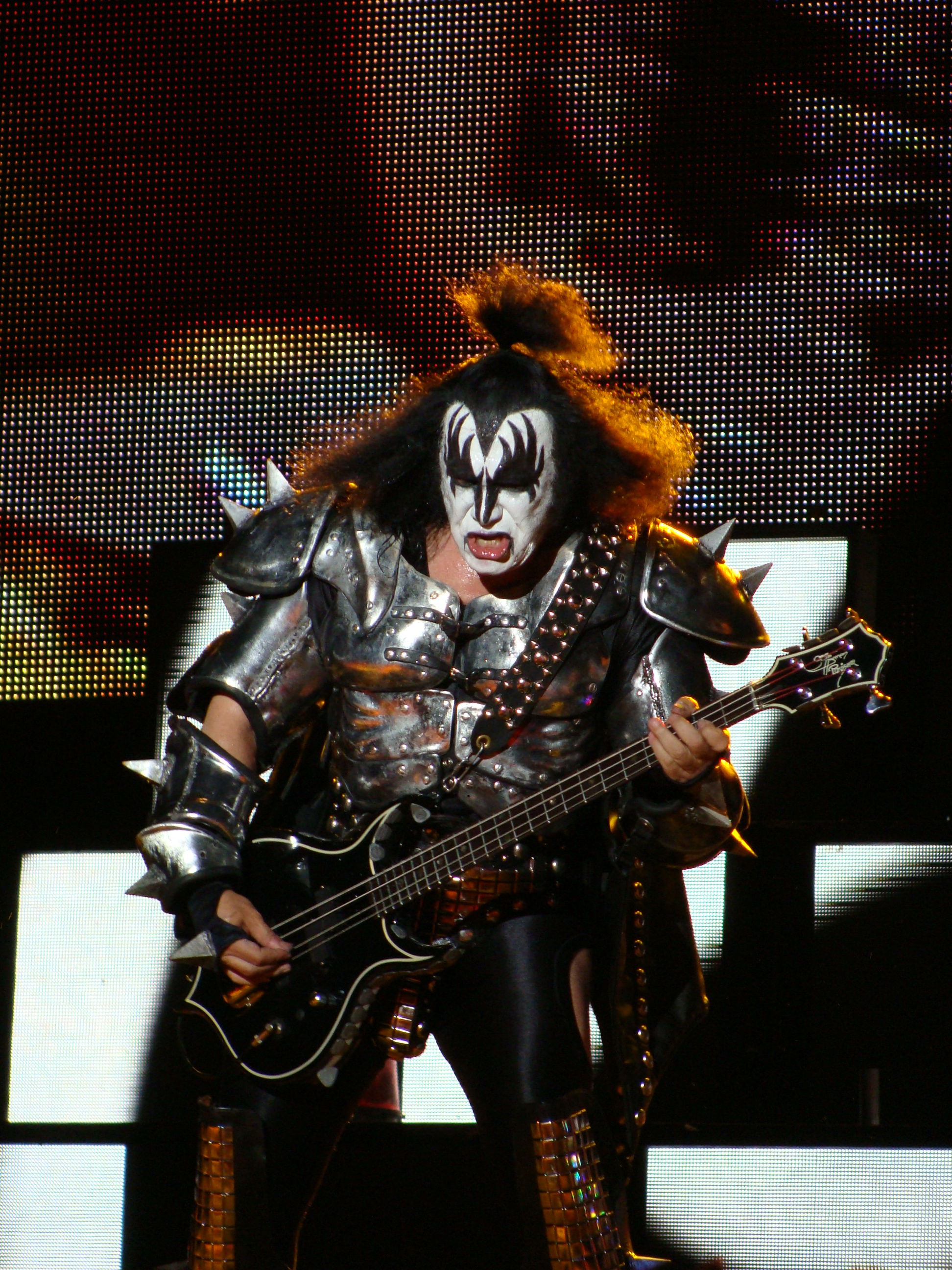
Kiss bass guitarist Gene Simmons (pictured), alongside his wife Shannon Tweed, was featured in "20,000 Patties Under the Sea".

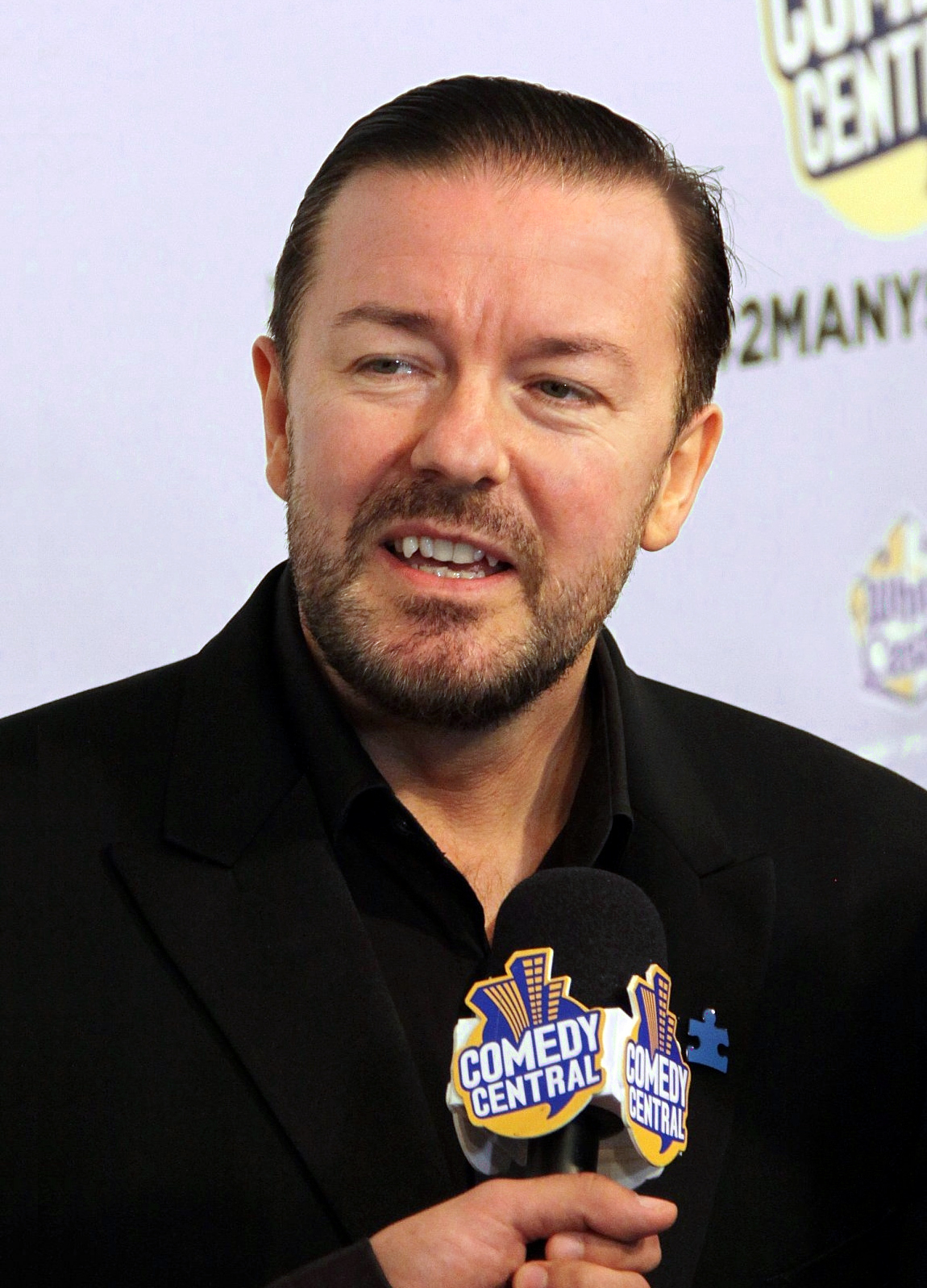
Comedian Ricky Gervais narrated "Truth or Square"; he appeared in live-action as himself.

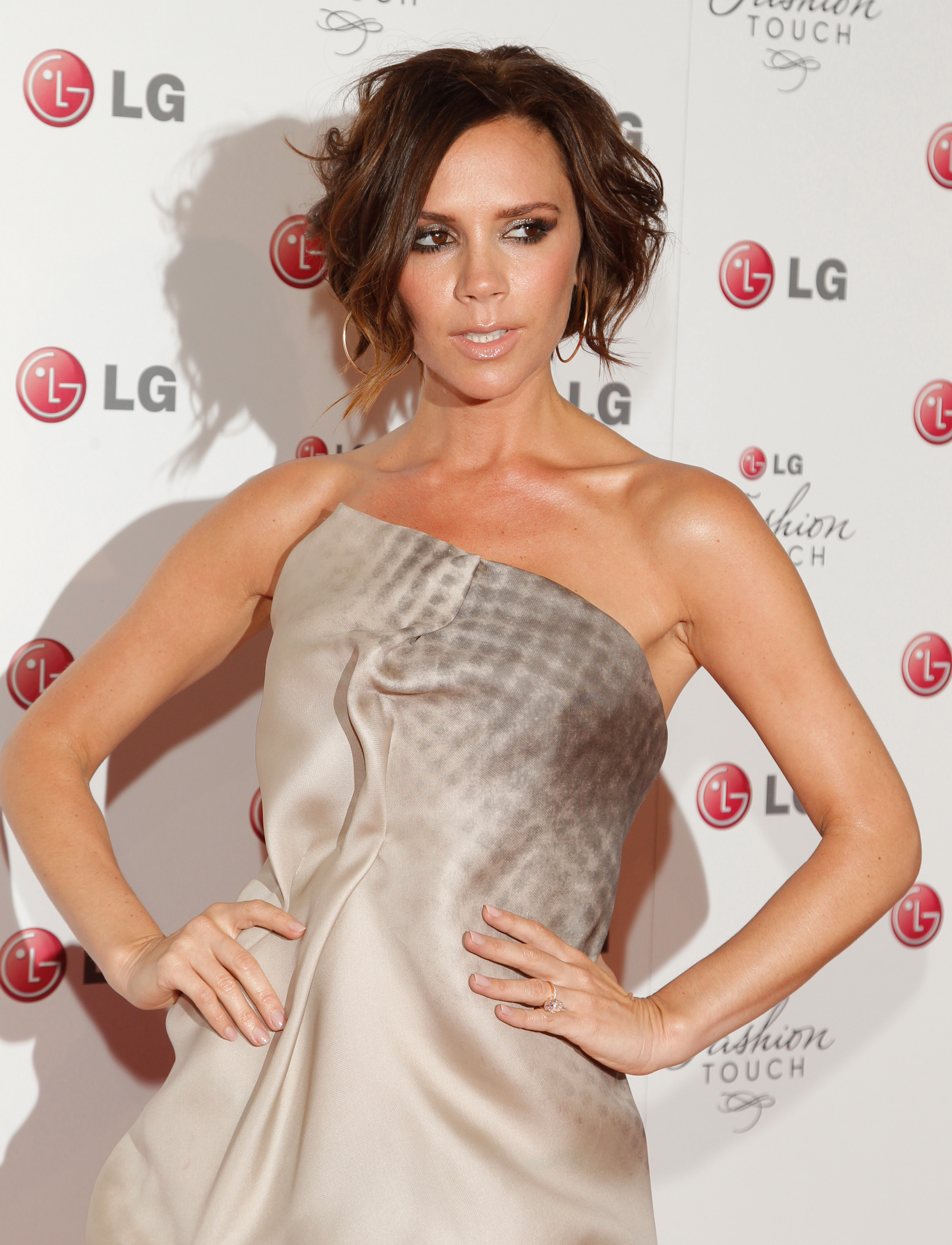
Singer Victoria Beckham voiced Queen Amphitrite in "The Clash of Triton"; she agreed to appear on the episode because her sons love the show.

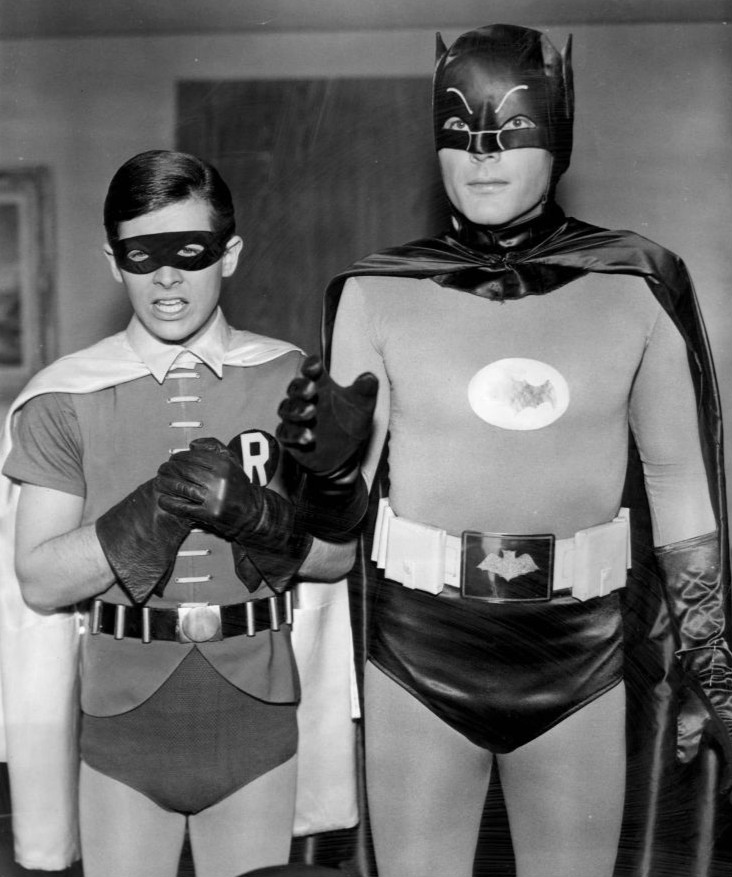
In the seventh-season episode "Back to the Past," Adam West (right) and Burt Ward, the original Batman and Robin, reunited as the young Mermaid Man and Barnacle Boy.

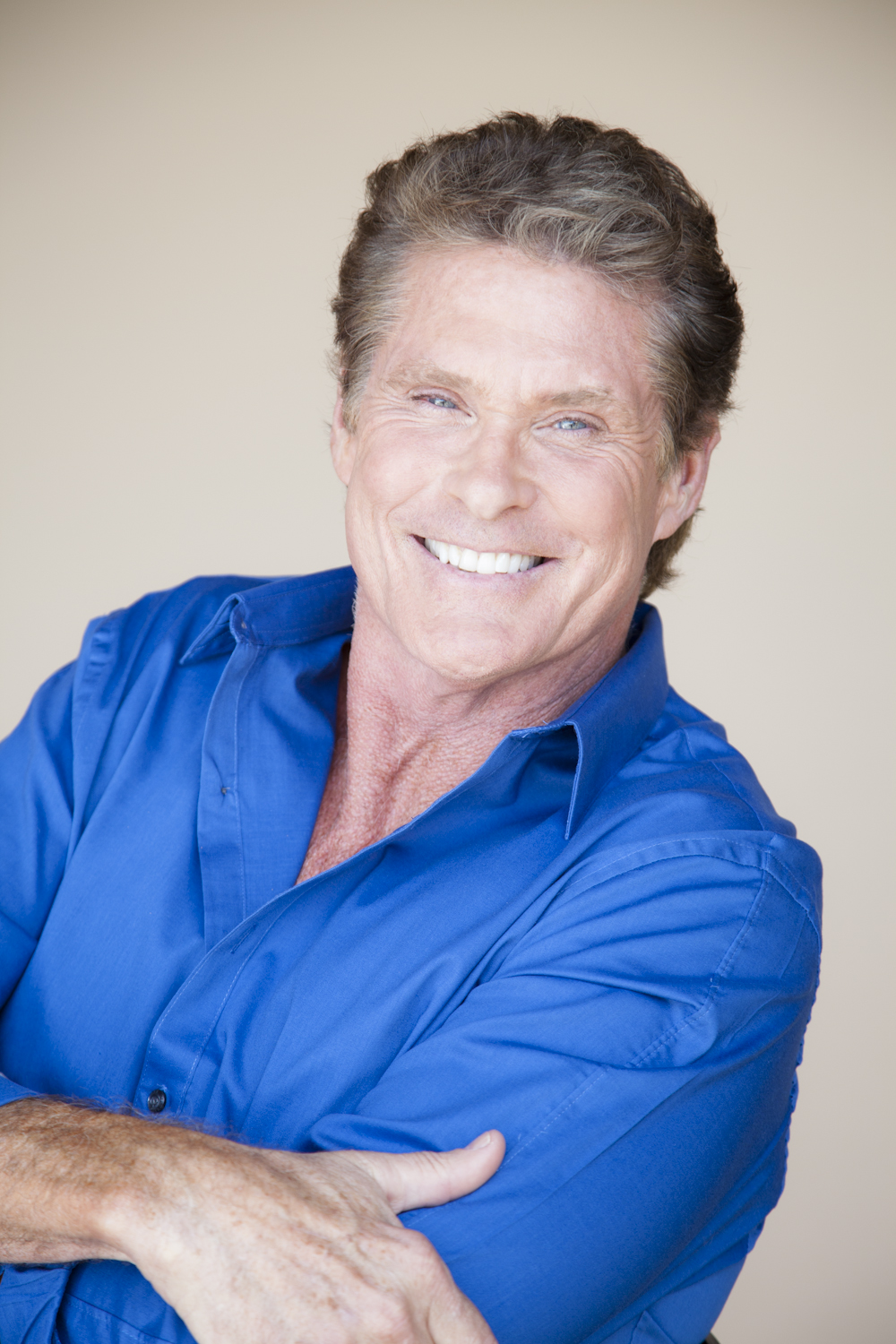
Actor David Hasselhoff appeared in live-action as himself in The SpongeBob SquarePants Movie; he parodied himself in the television program Baywatch.

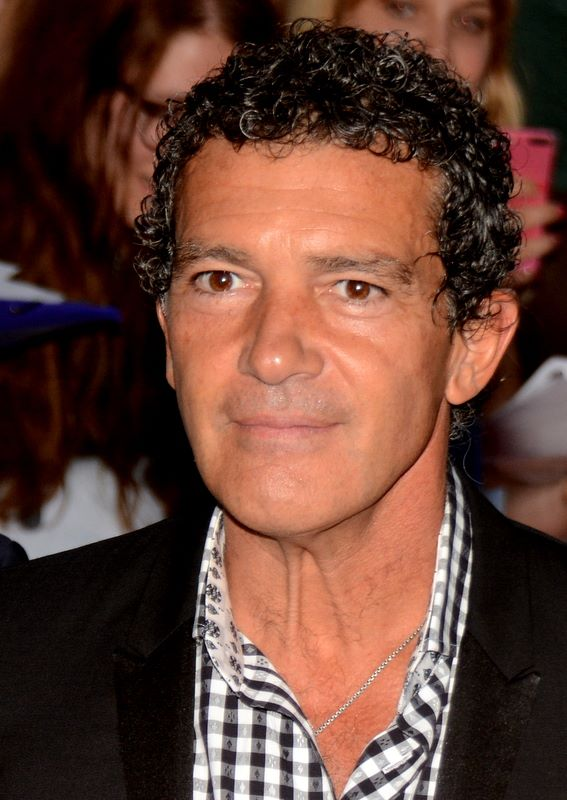
Antonio Banderas played the villainous Burger-Beard the Pirate in The SpongeBob Movie: Sponge Out of Water.

Season	Guest star	Role(s)	No.	Episode title	Ref.
1	Ernest Borgnine ‡	Mermaid Man	006a–06a	"Mermaid Man and Barnacle Boy"	
1	Tim Conway ‡	Barnacle Boy	006a–06a	"Mermaid Man and Barnacle Boy"	
1	Don Newhouse	Himself	006a–06a	"Mermaid Man and Barnacle Boy"	
1	Brian Doyle-Murray ‡	Flying Dutchman	013a−13a	"Scaredy Pants"	
1	Ghastly Ones	Themselves (special musical guest)	013a−13a	"Scaredy Pants"	
1	Brian Doyle-Murray ‡	Flying Dutchman	017a−017a	"Arrgh!"	
1	Junior Brown	Himself (special musical guest)	018a–18a	"Texas"	
1	John O'Hurley ‡	King Neptune	019b–19b	"Neptune's Spatula"	
1	Jim Jarmusch	Himself; Fisherman	020a–20a	"Hooky"	
1	John Lurie	Himself; Fisherman	020a–20a	"Hooky"	
1	Ernest Borgnine ‡	Mermaid Man	020b–20b	"Mermaid Man and Barnacle Boy II"	
1	Tim Conway ‡	Barnacle Boy	020b–20b	"Mermaid Man and Barnacle Boy II"	
1	Charles Nelson Reilly	Dirty Bubble	020b–20b	"Mermaid Man and Barnacle Boy II"	
2
2	Brian Doyle-Murray ‡	Flying Dutchman	021a-01a	"Your Shoe's Untied"	
2	Ween	Themselves (special musical guest)	021a-01a	"Your Shoe's Untied"	
2	The Capsules	Themselves (special musical guest)	022b–02b	"Bossy Boots"	
2	Brad Abrell ‡	Bubble Buddy	023b–03b	"Bubble Buddy"	
2	Corky Carroll	Grubby Grouper	023b–03b	"Bubble Buddy"	
2	Marion Ross ‡	Grandma SquarePants	026a–06a	"Grandma's Kisses"	
2	Pantera	Themselves (special musical guest)	027a–07a	"Prehibernation Week"	
2	Ernest Borgnine ‡	Mermaid Man	031a–11a	"Mermaid Man and Barnacle Boy III"	
2	Tim Conway ‡	Barnacle Boy	031a–11a	"Mermaid Man and Barnacle Boy III"	
2	John Rhys-Davies ‡	Man Ray	031a–11a	"Mermaid Man and Barnacle Boy III"	
2	Frank Welker ‡	Clamu; Baby Oyster	032b–12b	"The Smoking Peanut"	
2	Brian Doyle-Murray ‡	Flying Dutchman	033a−013a	"Shanghaied"	
2	Brad Abrell ‡	Announcer	035b–15b	"Band Geeks"	
3	Frank Welker ‡	Mystery	042b–02b	"My Pretty Seahorse"	
3	Steve Kehela ‡	TV Announcer	044b–04b	"Idiot Box"	
3	Ernest Borgnine ‡	Mermaid Man	045a–05a	"Mermaid Man and Barnacle Boy IV"	
3	Tim Conway ‡	Barnacle Boy	045a–05a	"Mermaid Man and Barnacle Boy IV"	
3	Rodney Bingenheimer	The DJ	049a–09a	"Krab Borg"	
3	Steve Kehela ‡	Narrator	050b–10b	"Krusty Krab Training Video"	
3	Lux Interior	Lead singer of the Bird Brains	051–11	"Party Pooper Pants"	
3	Kevin Michael Richardson ‡	King Neptune	051–11	"Party Pooper Pants"	
3	Ernest Borgnine ‡	Mermaid Man	052b–12b	"Mermaid Man and Barnacle Boy V"	
3	Tim Conway ‡	Barnacle Boy	052b–12b	"Mermaid Man and Barnacle Boy V"	
3	Martin Olson ‡	The Chief	052b–12b	"Mermaid Man and Barnacle Boy V"	
3	John Rhys-Davies ‡	Man Ray	052b–12b	"Mermaid Man and Barnacle Boy V"	
3	Brian Doyle-Murray ‡	Flying Dutchman	056a−016a	"Born Again Krabs"	
3	Frank Welker ‡	Gorilla	056b–16b	"I Had an Accident"	
4	Amy Poehler	Grandma	063–03	"Have You Seen This Snail?"	
4	Stew	Himself (special musical guest)	063–03	"Have You Seen This Snail?"	
4	C.H. Greenblatt	Carl	065a–05a	"Selling Out"	
4	Ernest Borgnine ‡	Mermaid Man	067b–07b	"Mermaid Man and Barnacle Boy VI: The Motion Picture"	
4	Tim Conway ‡	Barnacle Boy	067b–07b	"Mermaid Man and Barnacle Boy VI: The Motion Picture"	
4	Robin Sachs	Sam Roderick	069b–09b	"Mrs. Puff, You're Fired"	
4	Rik Mayall	Lord Reginald	070a–10a	"Chimps Ahoy"	
4	Nigel Planer	Dr. Marmalade	070a–10a	"Chimps Ahoy"	
4	Christopher Ryan	Professor Percy	070a–10a	"Chimps Ahoy"	
4	Brian Doyle-Murray ‡	Flying Dutchman	070b−10b	"Ghost Host"	
4	Pat Morita	Master Udon	071b–11b	"Karate Island"	
5	Patton Oswalt	Jim	082a–02a	"The Original Fry Cook"	
5	Ernest Borgnine ‡	Mermaid Man	082b–02b	"Night Light"	
5	Tim Conway ‡	Barnacle Boy	082b–02b	"Night Light"	
5	Mark Hamill	The Moth	082b–02b	"Night Light"	
5	Brian Doyle-Murray ‡	Flying Dutchman	088a−08a	"Money Talks"	
5	Gene Shalit	Gene Scallop	089a–09a	"The Krusty Sponge"	
5	David Bowie	Lord Royal Highness	092–12	"Atlantis SquarePantis"	
5	John DiMaggio	BlackJack SquarePants	093c–13c	"BlackJack"	
5	Marion Ross ‡	Grandma SquarePants	093c–13c	"BlackJack"	
5	Garnett Sailor	Uncle Cap’n Blue	093c–13c	"BlackJack"	
5	Ernest Borgnine ‡	Mermaid Man	094b–14b	"Mermaid Man vs. SpongeBob"	
5	Tim Conway ‡	Barnacle Boy	094b–14b	"Mermaid Man vs. SpongeBob"	
5	R. Lee Ermey	Prison Warden	095a–15a	"The Inmates of Summer"	
5	Gene Simmons	Sea monster	097a–17a	"20,000 Patties Under the Sea"	
5	Shannon Tweed	Mother	097a–17a	"20,000 Patties Under the Sea"	
5	Ray Liotta	Bubble Poppin' Boys leader	098–18	"What Ever Happened to SpongeBob?"	
5	Andrea Martin	Ms. Gristlepuss	100a–20a	"Banned in Bikini Bottom"	
5	Christopher Guest	Stanley S. SquarePants	100b–20b	"Stanley S. SquarePants"	
6	Alton Brown	Nicholas Withers	101a–01a	"House Fancy"	
6	Bruce Brown	Narrator	111–11	"SpongeBob SquarePants vs. The Big One"	
6	Johnny Depp	Jack Kahuna Laguna	111–11	"SpongeBob SquarePants vs. The Big One"	
6	Brian Doyle-Murray ‡	Flying Dutchman	111–11	"SpongeBob SquarePants vs. The Big One"	
6	Davy Jones	Himself	111–11	"SpongeBob SquarePants vs. The Big One"	
6	Ernest Borgnine ‡	Mermaid Man	113b–13b	"The Card"	
6	Ian McShane	Gordon	114a–14a	"Dear Vikings"	
6	Ernest Borgnine ‡	Mermaid Man	114b–14b	"Ditchin'"	
6	Tim Conway ‡	Barnacle Boy	114b–14b	"Ditchin'"	
6	Dennis Quaid	Grandpa Redbeard	115a–15a	"Grandpappy the Pirate"	
6	Ernest Borgnine ‡	Mermaid Man	117a–17a	"Shuffleboarding"	
6	Tim Conway ‡	Barnacle Boy	117a–17a	"Shuffleboarding"	
6	Dee Snider	Angry Jack	121b–21b	"Shell Shocked"	
6	Rosario Dawson	Herself	123/124–23/24	"Truth or Square"	
6	Eddie Deezen	Himself	123/124–23/24	"Truth or Square"	
6	Craig Ferguson	Himself	123/124–23/24	"Truth or Square"	
6	Will Ferrell	Himself	123/124–23/24	"Truth or Square"	
6	Tina Fey	Herself	123/124–23/24	"Truth or Square"	
6	Ricky Gervais	Himself; Narrator	123/124–23/24	"Truth or Square"	
6	LeBron James	Himself	123/124–23/24	"Truth or Square"	
6	Pink	Herself	123/124–23/24	"Truth or Square"	
6	Robert Smigel^{[B]}	Triumph the Insult Comic Dog	123/124–23/24	"Truth or Square"	
6	Robin Williams	Himself	123/124–23/24	"Truth or Square"	
6	Gregg Turkington	Camera Operator	123/124–23/24	"Truth or Square"	
6	Sebastian Bach	Triton	126–26	"The Clash of Triton"	
6	Victoria Beckham	Queen Amphitrite	126–26	"The Clash of Triton"	
6	John O'Hurley ‡	King Neptune	126–26	"The Clash of Triton"	
7	Ernest Borgnine ‡	Mermaid Man	135a–09a	"Back to the Past"	
7	Tim Conway ‡	Barnacle Boy	135a–09a	"Back to the Past"	
7	Burt Ward	Young Barnacle Boy	135a–09a	"Back to the Past"	
7	Adam West	Young Mermaid Man	135a–09a	"Back to the Past"	
7	Ernest Borgnine ‡	Mermaid Man	135b–09b	"The Bad Guy Club for Villains"	
7	Tim Conway ‡	Barnacle Boy	135b–09b	"The Bad Guy Club for Villains"	
7	Brian Doyle-Murray ‡	Flying Dutchman	133a−07a	"The Curse of Bikini Bottom"	
7	Laraine Newman ‡	Grandma Plankton	139a–13a	"Gramma's Secret Recipe"	
7	Ginnifer Goodwin	Teenage Mermaid	140b–14b	"Welcome to the Bikini Bottom Triangle"	
7	Kristen Wiig	Madame Hagfish	141a–15a	"The Curse of the Hex"	
7	Amy Sedaris ‡	Ma Angler	142a–16a	"Trenchbillies"	
7	Marion Ross ‡	Grandma SquarePants	146a–20a	"The Abrasive Side"	
8	Brian Doyle-Murray ‡	Flying Dutchman, Atomic Dutchman	162–10	"Ghoul Fools"	
8	Chris Elliott	Lord Poltergeist	162–10	"Ghoul Fools"	
8	Ernest Borgnine ‡	Mermaid Man	163a–11a	"Mermaid Man Begins"	
8	Tim Conway ‡	Barnacle Boy	163a–11a	"Mermaid Man Begins"	
8	Marion Ross ‡	Grandma SquarePants	164b–12b	"Pet Sitter Pat"	
8	Rich Fulcher	Fuzzy Acorns	166b–14b	"The Way of the Sponge"	
8	John Goodman	Santa Claus	175–23	"It's a SpongeBob Christmas!"	
8	Ernest Borgnine ‡	Mermaid Man	176a–24a	"Super Evil Aquatic Villain Team Up is Go!"	
8	Tim Conway ‡	Barnacle Boy	176a–24a	"Super Evil Aquatic Villain Team Up is Go!"	
8	Andy Samberg	Colonel Carper	178–26	"Hello Bikini Bottom"	
9	Johnny Knoxville	Johnny Krill	179a–01a	"Extreme Spots"	
9	Ernest Borgnine ‡	Mermaid Man	180a–02a	"Patrick-Man!"	
9	Tim Conway ‡	Barnacle Boy	180a–02a	"Patrick-Man!"	
9	Michael McKean ‡	Captain Frostymug	181a–03a	"License to Milkshake"	
9	Biz Markie	Kenny the Cat	188a–10a	"Kenny the Cat"	
9	Frank Ferrante	Stockholder Eel	191b–13b	"The Executive Treatment"	
9	Bob Barker	Bob Barnacle	193a–15a	"Sanctuary!"	
9	Aubrey Plaza	Nocturna	197a–19a	"Mall Girl Pearl"	
9	Betty White	Beatrice	197a–19a	"Mall Girl Pearl"	
9	Henry Winkler	Sharkface	198a–20a	"Sharks vs. Pods"	
9	Michael McKean ‡	Lonnie	198a–20a	"Sharks vs. Pods"	
9	David Lander	Donnie	198a–20a	"Sharks vs. Pods"	
9	James Arnold Taylor	Nick Fishkins, the isopod	199a–21a	"Sold!"	
9	Jon Hamm	Don Grouper	200–22	"Goodbye, Krabby Patty?"	
9	Eric Bauza	Shalmon	201a–23a	"Sandy's Nutmare"	
10	Ed Asner	Angry Old Man	205a–01a	"Whirly Brains"	
10	J. K. Simmons	Maestro Mackerel	208a–04a	"Snooze You Lose"	
10	John O'Hurley ‡	King Neptune	211b–07b	"Trident Trouble"	
10	Steve Buscemi	Dorsal Dan	213a–09a	"The Getaway"	
10	Joe Pantoliano	Stickyfins Whiting	213a–09a	"The Getaway"	
10	Peter Browngardt ‡	The Ice Cream King	214a–10a	"Patrick's Coupon"	
11	Bob Joles ‡	Man Ray	219a−04a	"Man Ray Returns"	
11	Brian Doyle-Murray ‡	Flying Dutchman	220−05	"The Legend of Boo-Kini Bottom"	
11	Jeff Garlin	Cuddle E. Hugs	225a–10a	"Cuddle E. Hugs"	
11	Keith David	Gary's collar	226a–11a	"Chatterbox Gary"	
11	Brian George	Coupe	227a–12a	"Drive Happy"	
11	Laraine Newman ‡	Grandma Plankton	228b–13b	"Grandmum's the Word"	
11	Kevin Michael Richardson ‡	Nurse Bazooka	231a–16a	"My Leg!"	
11	Laraine Newman ‡	Crab Lady	231b–16b	"Ink Lemonade"	
11	Brian Doyle-Murray ‡	Flying Dutchman	232b−17b	"Shopping List"	
11	Kevin Michael Richardson ‡	Sir Urchin	235b–20b	"Library Cards"	
11	Lewis Black	Santa Claus	237–22	"Goons on the Moon"	
11	Alexander Ward	Nosferatu	239b–24b	"The Night Patty"	
12	Peter Browngardt ‡	The Ice Cream King	243a–02a	"The Nitwitting"	
12	Fred Tatasciore	Singing Tennessee Ernie Flounder	243a–02a	"The Nitwitting"	
12	Martin Olson ‡	The Chief	247a–06a	"Swamp Mates"	
12	Maurice LaMarche ‡	Bus Driver	248b–07b	"Squid's on a Bus"	
12	Maria Bamford	Macadamia, Hazelnut and Pistachio	249a–08a	"Sandy's Nutty Nieces"	
12	Bobby Cannavale	Tony	251a–10a	"Shell Games"	
12	Charlie Adler	Manager, Jelly Fisher Gal, and Fan Boy	253a–12a	"Jolly Lodgers"	
12	Lana Condor	Herself	254/255−13/14	"SpongeBob's Big Birthday Blowout"	
12	Lilli Cooper	Herself	254/255−13/14	"SpongeBob's Big Birthday Blowout"	
12	Vernon Davis	Himself	254/255−13/14	"SpongeBob's Big Birthday Blowout"	
12	Gilbert Gottfried ‡	Himself	254/255−13/14	"SpongeBob's Big Birthday Blowout"	
12	Jack Griffo	Himself	254/255−13/14	"SpongeBob's Big Birthday Blowout"	
12	Rob Gronkowski	Himself	254/255−13/14	"SpongeBob's Big Birthday Blowout"	
12	Tiffany Haddish	Herself	254/255−13/14	"SpongeBob's Big Birthday Blowout"	
12	David Hasselhoff	Himself	254/255−13/14	"SpongeBob's Big Birthday Blowout"	
12	Heidi Klum	Herself	254/255−13/14	"SpongeBob's Big Birthday Blowout"	
12	Kel Mitchell	Himself	254/255−13/14	"SpongeBob's Big Birthday Blowout"	
12	Kal Penn	Himself	254/255−13/14	"SpongeBob's Big Birthday Blowout"	
12	Daniella Perkins	Herself	254/255−13/14	"SpongeBob's Big Birthday Blowout"	
12	RuPaul	Himself	254/255−13/14	"SpongeBob's Big Birthday Blowout"	
12	Jojo Siwa	Herself	254/255−13/14	"SpongeBob's Big Birthday Blowout"	
12	Danny Skinner	Himself	254/255−13/14	"SpongeBob's Big Birthday Blowout"	
12	Ethan Slater	Himself	254/255−13/14	"SpongeBob's Big Birthday Blowout"	
12	Jason Sudeikis	Himself	254/255−13/14	"SpongeBob's Big Birthday Blowout"	
12	Sigourney Weaver	Herself	254/255−13/14	"SpongeBob's Big Birthday Blowout"	
12	Gary Anthony Williams	Goofy Manager	258b−17b	"The Goofy Newbie"	
12	Brian Doyle-Murray ‡	Flying Dutchman	259a−18a	"The Ghost of Plankton"	
12	Gilbert Gottfried ‡	Sal	262b–21b	"The Hankering"	
12	Rob Paulsen ‡	Glove World Officer	266–25	"Escape from Beneath Glove World"	
12	Nyasha Hatendi	Hieronymus Glove	266–25	"Escape from Beneath Glove World"	
12	Maurice LaMarche ‡	Paul Frees	266–25	"Escape from Beneath Glove World"	
13	Alexander Ward ‡	Nosferatu	268a–01a	"A Place for Pets"	
13	Christopher Guest ‡	Clem Clam	270a−03a	"Goofy Scoopers"	
13	Ed Begley Jr.	Rock T. Puss	270a−03a	"Goofy Scoopers"	
13	Gary Anthony Williams ‡	Manager, Garbage Man, DJ 2 Sc00pz, and a crowd member	270a−03a	"Goofy Scoopers"	
13	Carlos Alazraqui	Nobby	271a−04a	"Something Narwhal This Way Comes"	
13	Kate Higgins	Narlene	271a−04a	"Something Narwhal This Way Comes"	
13	Lewis Black ‡	Santa Claus	272−05	"SpongeBob's Road to Christmas"	
13	Brian George ‡	Guru	273a−06a	"Potato Puff"	
13	Bob Joles ‡	Man Ray	277a−10a	"Captain Pipsqueak"	
13	Alexander Ward ‡	Nosferatu	277a−10a	"Captain Pipsqueak"	
13	Alexander Ward ‡	Nosferatu	277a−10a	"Squidferatu"	
13	Alexander Ward ‡	Nosferatu	277b−10b	"Slappy Daze"	
13	Dana Snyder	GrandPat Star	279a−12a	"Welcome to Binary Bottom"	
13	Dana Snyder ‡	GrandPat Star	279c−12c	"A Skin Wrinkle in Time"	
13	Brad Garrett	Wise Kraken	280a−13a	"Abandon Twits"	
13	Jeffrey Combs	Wally	280b−13b	"Wallhalla"	
13	Kevin Michael Richardson ‡	Sir Urchin	282a−15a	"Arbor Day Disarray"	
13	Steve Buscemi ‡	Dorsal Dan	282b-15b	"Ain't That the Tooth"	
13	Jennifer Tilly	Petunia	284a−17a	"The Flower Plot"	
13	Peter Browngardt ‡	The Ice Cream King	284b−17b	"SpongeBob on Parade"	
13	Kevin Michael Richardson ‡	Sir Urchin	286b–19b	"Sir Urchin and Snail Fail"	
13	Rhys Darby	Krabby Patty	289a–22a	"My Friend Patty"	
13	Mark Dacascos	Guru Greasetrap	290a–23a	"Spatula of the Heavens"	
13	Peter Browngardt ‡	The Ice Cream King; Citizens	291b-24b	"The Goobfather"	
13	Gary Anthony Williams ‡	The Goobfather	291b-24b	"The Goobfather"	
13	Brian Doyle-Murray ‡	Flying Dutchman	293b−26b	"Sandy, Help Us!"	
14	Dana Snyder ‡	Lil' GrandPat	295a−02a	"We ♥ Hoops"	
14	Cree Summer ‡	Squiggly	295a−02a	"We ♥ Hoops"	
14	Paul Tibbitt ‡	DoodleBob	296b-03b	"Squidiot Box"	
14	Marion Ross ‡	Grandma SquarePants	297b−04b	"Don't Make Me Laugh"	
14	Malcolm McDowell	Percival Rockhound	298b−05b	"Pet the Rock"	
14	Kevin Michael Richardson ‡	Sir Urchin	298b−05b	"Pet the Rock"	
14	Rosie Perez	Suzie Groove	299a−06a	"Tango Tangle"	
14	Carlos Alazraqui ‡	Nobby	300b−07b	"In the Mood to Feud"	
14	Kate Higgins ‡	Narlene	300b−07b	"In the Mood to Feud"	
14	India de Beaufort	Maisey Manes	302/303−09/10	"Kreepaway Kamp"	
14	Jess Harnell	Wise Kraken	302/303−09/10	"Kreepaway Kamp"	
14	Carlos Alazraqui ‡	Nobby	302/303−09/10	"Kreepaway Kamp"	
14	Kate Higgins ‡	Narlene	302/303−09/10	"Kreepaway Kamp"	
14	Thomas F. Wilson ‡	Cecil Star	305b-12b	"Sheldon SquarePants"	
14	Cree Summer ‡	Bunny Star	305b-12b	"Sheldon SquarePants"	
14	Lewis Black ‡	Santa Claus	306−13	"Sandy's Country Christmas"	
14	Johnny Knoxville ‡	Randy Cheeks	306−13	"Sandy's Country Christmas"	
14	Grey DeLisle	Granny Cheeks; Ma Cheeks; Rosie Cheeks; Rowdy Cheeks	306−13	"Sandy's Country Christmas"	
14	Craig Robinson	Pa Cheeks	306−13	"Sandy's Country Christmas"	
15	Richard Ayoade	Sammy Suckerfish	307a-01a	"Sammy Suckerfish"	
15	Jon Lovitz	Acceleration T. Greenlight	310b-04b	"Student Driver Survivor"	
15	Jeffrey Combs ‡	Wally	311b-05b	"Stuck in an Elevator"	
15	Henry Winkler ‡	Jeffy Tentacles	314a-08a	"Jeffy T's Prankwell Emporium"	
15	Danny Giovannini	Sub-Marinara	317a-11a	"Delivery of Doom"	
15	Henry Winkler ‡	Sharkface	317b-11b	"My Father the Boat"	
16	"Weird Al" Yankovic	I.M. Poster the Pirate	320a-01a	"Bizarro Bottom"	
16	Zoe McGaha-Schletter	Kids	320a-01a	"Bizarro Bottom"	
16	Dashiell McGaha-Schletter	Kids	320a-01a	"Bizarro Bottom"	
16	John O'Hurley ‡	King Neptune	323/324-04/05	"SpongeBob and Patrick's Timeline Twist-Up"	
16	Thomas F. Wilson ‡	Cecil Star	323/324-04/05	"SpongeBob and Patrick's Timeline Twist-Up"	
16	Cree Summer ‡	Bunny Star; Granny Tentacles	323/324-04/05	"SpongeBob and Patrick's Timeline Twist-Up"	
16	Dana Snyder ‡	GrandPat Star	323/324-04/05	"SpongeBob and Patrick's Timeline Twist-Up"	
16	Jess Harnell	Wise Kraken	323/324-04/05	"SpongeBob and Patrick's Timeline Twist-Up"	
16	Gary Anthony Williams	Dutch; Goofy Manager	323/324-04/05	"SpongeBob and Patrick's Timeline Twist-Up"	
16	Kevin Michael Richardson ‡	Sir Urchin	323/324-04/05	"SpongeBob and Patrick's Timeline Twist-Up"	
16	Craig T. Nelson	Coach Cod	330-11	"Pigskin Pearl"	
17	Maurice LaMarche ‡	Marlin Branzino	333b-01b	"The SquarePants Method"	
17	Kevin McDonald	Guy Fishman	334a-02a	"Kiss of the Nematode"	
17	Amy Sedaris ‡	Blobba Yaga	334a-02a	"Kiss of the Nematode"	
17	Wallace Shawn	Piney	335a-03a	"Home Away from Home"	
17	Kevin Michael Richardson ‡	Tiki	335a-03a	"Home Away from Home"	
17	Johnny Knoxville ‡	Randy Cheeks	343a-11a	"Backyard Bickering"	
17	Jonathan Banks	Don Scarfish	344b-12b	"Sounds Like Trouble"	
Movie	Alec Baldwin	Dennis	M1	The SpongeBob SquarePants Movie	
Movie	David Hasselhoff	Himself	M1	The SpongeBob SquarePants Movie	
Movie	Scarlett Johansson	Princess Mindy	M1	The SpongeBob SquarePants Movie	
Movie	Jeffrey Tambor	King Neptune	M1	The SpongeBob SquarePants Movie	
Movie 2	Antonio Banderas	Burger-Beard the Pirate	M2	The SpongeBob Movie: Sponge Out of Water	
Movie 2	Matt Berry	Bubbles	M2	The SpongeBob Movie: Sponge Out of Water	
Movie 2	Peter Shukoff	Seagull, and Surfer	M2	The SpongeBob Movie: Sponge Out of Water	
Movie 2	Lloyd Ahlquist	Seagull, and Surfer	M2	The SpongeBob Movie: Sponge Out of Water	
Movie 2	Eric Bauza ‡	Seagull	M2	The SpongeBob Movie: Sponge Out of Water	
Movie 2	Tim Conway ‡	Seagull	M2	The SpongeBob Movie: Sponge Out of Water	
Movie 2	Eddie Deezen ‡	Seagull	M2	The SpongeBob Movie: Sponge Out of Water	
Movie 2	Nolan North	Seagull	M2	The SpongeBob Movie: Sponge Out of Water	
Movie 2	Rob Paulsen	Seagull	M2	The SpongeBob Movie: Sponge Out of Water	
Movie 2	Kevin Michael Richardson ‡	Seagull	M2	The SpongeBob Movie: Sponge Out of Water	
Movie 2	April Stewart	Seagull	M2	The SpongeBob Movie: Sponge Out of Water	
Movie 2	Cree Summer	Seagull	M2	The SpongeBob Movie: Sponge Out of Water	
Movie 2	Billy West	Seagull	M2	The SpongeBob Movie: Sponge Out of Water	
Movie 3	Matt Berry	King Poseidon	M3	The SpongeBob Movie: Sponge on the Run	
Movie 3	Awkwafina	Otto	M3	The SpongeBob Movie: Sponge on the Run	
Movie 3	Tiffany Haddish	Master of Ceremonies	M3	The SpongeBob Movie: Sponge on the Run	
Movie 3	Reggie Watts	Chancellor	M3	The SpongeBob Movie: Sponge on the Run	
Movie 3	Aaron Smith De Niro	Security Guard	M3	The SpongeBob Movie: Sponge on the Run	
Movie 3	Tyler Peterson	Poseidon Concierge	M3	The SpongeBob Movie: Sponge on the Run	
Movie 3	Keanu Reeves	Sage	M3	The SpongeBob Movie: Sponge on the Run	
Movie 3	Snoop Dogg	The Gambler	M3	The SpongeBob Movie: Sponge on the Run	
Movie 3	Danny Trejo	El Diablo	M3	The SpongeBob Movie: Sponge on the Run	
Movie 3	Rick Pasqualone	Dealer	M3	The SpongeBob Movie: Sponge on the Run	
Movie 3	Antonio Raul Corbo	Young SpongeBob	M3	The SpongeBob Movie: Sponge on the Run	
Movie 3	Jack Gore	Young Patrick	M3	The SpongeBob Movie: Sponge on the Run	
Movie 3	Jason Maybaum	Young Squidward	M3	The SpongeBob Movie: Sponge on the Run	
Movie 3	Presley Williams	Young Sandy	M3	The SpongeBob Movie: Sponge on the Run	
Movie 4	Mark Hamill ‡	The Flying Dutchman	M4	The SpongeBob Movie: Search for SquarePants	
Movie 4	Regina Hall	Barb	M4	The SpongeBob Movie: Search for SquarePants	
Movie 4	George Lopez	JK Fishlips	M4	The SpongeBob Movie: Search for SquarePants	
Movie 4	Isis "Ice Spice" Gaston	Ticket Taker Fish	M4	The SpongeBob Movie: Search for SquarePants	
Movie 4	Arturo Castro	Santa Monica Ticket Operator	M4	The SpongeBob Movie: Search for SquarePants	
Movie 4	Sherry Cola	Studio Spokesperson, Krusty Krab Attendant	M4	The SpongeBob Movie: Search for SquarePants	

== Notes ==
- A. Bands are counted as a single unit as there is no confirmation of which of the band's members performed in their appearances.
- B. The character puppet was puppeteered and voiced by Robert Smigel.
