= TOTR =

TOTR may refer to

- TV on the Radio, an American band
- Thrillville: Off the Rails, a video game
- Тотя (meme), an internet meme
