= Mermaid Man and Barnacle Boy =

Superheroes from SpongeBob SquarePants

- SpongeBob SquarePants characters
- Mermaid Man (left) and Barnacle Boy
- First appearance: "Mermaid Man and Barnacle Boy"; SpongeBob SquarePants; August 21, 1999
- Created by: Stephen Hillenburg
- Voiced by: Mermaid Man: Ernest Borgnine (1999–2012); Joe Whyte (in SpongeBob SquarePants: Employee of the Month and SpongeBob SquarePants: Battle for Bikini Bottom); Joe Alaskey (in SpongeBob SquarePants: Lights, Camera, Pants!); Daniel Hagen (in SpongeBob Moves In); Tom Kenny (young; in "Mermaid Man and Barnacle Boy" and The Patrick Star Show); Adam West (young, in "Back to the Past"); Barnacle Boy: Tim Conway (1999–2012); Burt Ward (young; in "Back to the Past"); Tom Kenny (young; in The Patrick Star Show)

In-universe information
- Species: Humans
- Occupation: Superheroes
- Origin: Shady Shoals Rest Home, Bikini Bottom, Pacific Ocean

Mermaid Man and Barnacle Boy are a duo of fictional characters from the American animated television series SpongeBob SquarePants. They were respectively voiced by guest stars Ernest Borgnine and Tim Conway. Mermaid Man and Barnacle Boy first appeared in the eponymous season one episode that premiered on August 21, 1999, and were since featured as recurring characters. Following the deaths of Borgnine and Conway in 2012 and 2019 respectively, the characters have been relegated to non-speaking cameos.

Mermaid Man and Barnacle Boy are two elderly human superheroes who live in a retirement home and are stars of SpongeBob and Patrick's favorite television show. The characters also evoke the camp style of the 1960s ‘‘Batman’’ television series, a Silver Age-era portrayal of Batman; this connection was later underlined when Adam West and Burt Ward, who played Batman and Robin in that series, voiced the younger Mermaid Man and Barnacle Boy in “Back to the Past”.

Mermaid Man appears to suffer from memory loss and dramatically yells "Evil!" whenever he hears the word, while Barnacle Boy seems to be the more sensible and more irritable of the two. They made their final regular appearances in the season 9 episode "Patrick-Man!".

== Role in SpongeBob SquarePants ==
Mermaid Man and Barnacle Boy are semi-retired superheroes in the fictional city of Bikini Bottom. They are among the few humans who can breathe underwater and speak to the inhabitants of Bikini Bottom. Within the show's fictional universe, they are real superheroes. In addition to fighting crime, the duo has been extensively franchised throughout Bikini Bottom, including the television series The Adventures of Mermaid Man and Barnacle Boy, a long-running comic book series, trading cards, and kids' meals at the Krusty Krab. Mermaid Man and Barnacle Boy currently reside at Shady Shoals Retirement Home. However, their two biggest fans, SpongeBob SquarePants and Patrick Star, convince them to come out of retirement in their first appearance.

=== Mermaid Man ===
"What could you possibly describe about the character that has a thing all over his nose like this... and says "EVIL!"

— Ernest Borgnine

Ernie Huckler, better known as Mermaid Man, is a stereotypically senile elder, and appears to suffer from slight memory loss as he is easily confused by others' behavior, though this also could be partly credited to his hearing loss. As a young adult, Mermaid Man had a muscular, athletic build, but the elderly Mermaid Man is overweight and out of shape. As compared to his sidekick, Barnacle Boy, he is slightly less grouchy and somewhat more tolerant of SpongeBob's ecstatic optimism, but only to a certain extent as SpongeBob's slips or mistakes have triggered serious consequences before in the past, and his partner seems annoyed with Mermaid Man's absentminded tendencies.

The episode "Mermaid Man Begins" reveals that, through a series of meticulous and intricate events, he and his friend were suddenly equipped with aquatically themed superpowers when they left the microwave on too long, causing their popcorn to become slightly overcooked. After eating the popcorn, they gain their signature superpowers. They then choose to dedicate their lives to brawling undersea crime as a result (it is implied that the backstory behind the duo's powers as described in Bikini Bottom media was in fact far different from the presumably actual backstory Mermaid Man and Barnacle Boy remembered from differing perspectives).

=== Barnacle Boy ===
Tim Stangler, better known as Barnacle Boy, is the undercredited and underappreciated younger sidekick of Mermaid Man. Grumpy and slightly ill-tempered, Barnacle Boy is notable for his brooding, moody disposition and exasperation with his partner's absentminded behavior as a result of old age. Even as he ages, Barnacle Boy is still treated in a juvenile fashion, and coddled in an infantile way.

== Development ==
An early drawing of Mermaid Man and Barnacle Boy predecessor "Barnacle Bill", an elderly sailor with a body made of wood, by Hillenburg

=== Voice ===
Series creator Hillenburg described the guest appearances of Ernest Borgnine and Tim Conway as "so fantastic." He said "From the very beginning, the first real guest stars were Borgnine and Conway [...] When you have a guest artist, you don't know how it's going to turn out. But Borgnine is the most animated guy on the planet."

According to casting supervisor Jennie Monica Hammond, Hillenburg and Derek Drymon, the show's creative director, already knew that they wanted Borgnine and Conway to provide the voices when they were voice casting for Mermaid Man and Barnacle Boy. They were on top of the list of actors they wanted to cast, and Hillenburg and Drymon were fans of 1960s show McHale's Navy, in which Borgnine and Conway starred. Hillenburg and Drymon directly approached Borgnine and Conway, and the actors both accepted. Following the deaths of Borgnine and Conway in 2012 and 2019 respectively, the characters have been relegated to non-speaking cameos after creator Stephen Hillenburg made the executive decision to not recast them.

==== Voice of Mermaid Man ====
A younger Mermaid Man (left) and Barnacle Boy (right)

On casting the voice for Mermaid Man, Borgnine's voice cracked when he was giving the "Evil!" voice. In an interview with the Archive of American Television, Borgnine said "By golly! We started something ... and we kept it [the voice] in." Borgnine described the voice-over as it is like "stealing money" whereas "your voice becomes the actor ... you make that character come alive through your voice."

On July 8, 2012, Borgnine died of kidney failure at the age of 95. Nickelodeon honored him with a two-hour SpongeBob SquarePants marathon featuring episodes focused upon his character.

The young Mermaid Man was voiced by Tom Kenny in the first season episode "Mermaid Man and Barnacle Boy" and The Patrick Star Show episode "Super Sitters", and by Adam West in the seventh season episode "Back to the Past".

==== Voice of Barnacle Boy ====
Barnacle Boy was voiced by Conway, who co-starred with Borgnine in the sitcom McHale's Navy. In 2010, Burt Ward guest starred as the young Barnacle Boy in the episode "Back to the Past". .

On September 27, 2018, SpongeBob showrunner Vincent Waller confirmed that Conway would not reprise his role as Barnacle Boy, citing health issues, noting difficulties in recording his lines for The SpongeBob Movie: Sponge Out of Water. Conway died of normal pressure hydrocephalus at the age of 85 on May 14, 2019.
