= SpongeBob, You're Fired =

- SpongeBob SquarePants episode
- Title card
- Episode no.: Season 9 Episode 11
- Directed by: Alan Smart (animation and supervising); Tom Yasumi (animation); Marc Ceccarelli (storyboard); Luke Brookshier (storyboard)
- Written by: Marc Ceccarelli; Luke Brookshier; Mr. Lawrence
- Production code: 325-941/325-942
- Original air date: November 11, 2013
- Running time: 22 minutes

Episode chronology
← Previous "Yeti Krabs"	Next → "The SpongeBob Movie: Sponge Out of Water"
- SpongeBob SquarePants (season 9)

"SpongeBob, You're Fired" is a television special of the American animated television series SpongeBob SquarePants, serving as the eleventh episode (ninth on Paramount+) of the ninth season and the 189th overall episode. It was written by Marc Ceccarelli, Luke Brookshier, and Mr. Lawrence (the former two also serving as storyboard directors), with supervising director Alan Smart and Tom Yasumi serving as animation directors. Originally premiering in Greece on July 3, 2013, it premiered on Nickelodeon in the United States that same year on November 11. In this episode, SpongeBob is dismissed from his job at the Krusty Krab after his boss, Mr. Krabs, discovers that he can save a nickel by letting him go. Subsequently, SpongeBob's attempts to apply at other restaurants end in humiliating failure, and he is promised to take his cooking home and never make patties again.

"SpongeBob, You're Fired" was first screened at the 2013 San Diego Comic-Con. Prior to broadcast on television, the episode sparked a political debate when Media Matters for America and Al Sharpton of MSNBC accused both the New York Post and Fox News of using the episode in its argument against social services. The premiere of "SpongeBob, You're Fired" drew 5.19 million viewers, the biggest audience viewership for a SpongeBob SquarePants episode in two years since "Frozen Face-Off" in July 2011.

== Plot ==
A scene from the episode depicting a depressed SpongeBob, while being encouraged by Patrick for the "glorious unemployment"

At the Krusty Krab, owner Mr. Krabs dismisses SpongeBob from his fry cook position to save a nickel, leaving SpongeBob jobless. SpongeBob's best friend and neighbor Patrick tells him the benefits of being unemployed. The two have a day of "funemployment", but it ends with SpongeBob realizing that he needs a job. Over the next few days, SpongeBob tries getting a job at a hot dog joint, a pizzeria, a taqueria, and an Asian noodle house. He is fired every time for making food themed around Krabby Patties, instead of what each restaurant specializes in, and causing SpongeBob to take his cooking home in disgrace and stop making patties forever. However, when the patty items are a hit with the customers, the desperate restaurant managers fight with each other to get him back.

A mysterious person in a Krabby Patty costume arrives, defeats the restaurant managers, and takes SpongeBob back to the Krusty Krab. The person in the Krabby Patty costume is revealed to be Squidward, who tells SpongeBob that the restaurant has faltered ever since Mr. Krabs fired SpongeBob. Both he and Mr. Krabs (who declares that he should never have let SpongeBob go) ask SpongeBob to be the fry cook again. With his confidence restored, SpongeBob gladly accepts his old job, and brings back all the customers, even the restaurant managers who previously fought over him. At the end of the episode, Mr. Krabs installs a pay toilet that costs a nickel to use, thus making up the nickel that he previously lost by paying SpongeBob.

== Promotion ==
On July 21, 2013, Tom Kenny presented an event called "SpongeCon 2013: The Year of the Fan" at San Diego Comic-Con in 2013. The event hosted the official and exclusive sneak preview of "SpongeBob, You're Fired" and the screening of the SpongeBob SquareShorts global short film competition finalists. Prior to the official preview, a sneak peek of the episode was featured on Nick Studio 10, hosted by Noah Grossman and Gabrielle "Gabby" Senn, on June 10, 2013.

In an October 30, 2013 article of the New York Post, it was first reported that "SpongeBob, You're Fired" would air on Nickelodeon in the United States on November 11, 2013.

Two days prior to the premiere, Nickelodeon debuted an online game on Nick.com based on the episode with the same name. Furthermore, Nickelodeon published an episode collection called SpongeBob SquarePants: Get to Work! on iTunes. On November 6, Nickelodeon debuted the full-length trailer of the episode. Earlier that day, The Hollywood Reporter exclusively debuted the 45-second teaser. The source also released in advance an exclusive 90-second trailer of the episode on November 4.

== Ratings ==
"SpongeBob, You're Fired" first aired on Nickelodeon (Greece) on July 3, 2013. In the United States, it premiered on November 11. The original U.S. airing of the episode on Nickelodeon brought in the biggest audience viewership for a SpongeBob SquarePants episode in two years, with 5.186 million viewers tuning in overall. The episode tied with CBS' Hostages, the "poorest performer", from the "Big Four" of the night. However, across cable, the show outperformed The Real Housewives of Beverly Hills (0.8 adults), Teen Mom (0.7 adults) and The Daily Show (0.6 adults). The broadcast was the second most viewed show among all the day's cable programs (a Monday Night Football contest between the Miami Dolphins and Tampa Bay Buccaneers on ESPN came first). The episode topped the 2–11, 6–11 and 9–14 in the kids demographics.

== Reception and controversy ==
The episode subtly introduces a couple of hot-button issues, including the worth of social services, labor laws that caused SpongeBob's boss, Mr. Krabs, to fire his best employee, and more [...]

— Paul Bond, The Hollywood Reporter

"SpongeBob, You're Fired" was the subject of a political debate in the media concerning the Supplemental Nutrition Assistance Program (Food Stamps benefit). In a scene from the episode, Patrick tries to show SpongeBob "the benefits of being unemployed", to which SpongeBob replies, "Unemployment may be fun for you, but I need to get a job." The scene was meant to demonstrate the title character's "eternal optimism and willingness to get back to work...in a way that's still funny and relatable". However, some political activists claimed the scene was a "slam" to the Food Stamps benefit. A report by The Hollywood Reporter alleged that the episode may have had a political agenda about the social safety net, adding that in some episodes, the show's social commentary is typically left-leaning.

According to the National Post, the storyline is said to be "symbolic of a harsh economic climate". Prior to the premiere, Andrea Morabito of the New York Post published an article on the episode. Critics accused the author of attacking "poor people" who rely on government assistance, referring to individuals who rely on food stamps as "mooching off the social services" and applauding SpongeBob for instead quickly returning to "gainful employment". Fox News's Heather Nauert of Fox & Friends echoed similar sentiments, adding "the harsh economic climate has hit the underwater community".

After the New York Post and Fox News commented on the episode, Media Matters for America, a politically progressive media watchdog group, responded. The group accused the right-wing media sources, both owned by media tycoon Rupert Murdoch, of using the episode "to slam poor people who use social services", arguing that the two "are using the firing of fictional cartoon character SpongeBob SquarePants to attack the social safety net and those who rely on it". Media Matters was "also particularly bothered by [a] line from The Post story: 'Lest he sit around idly, mooching off the social services of Bikini Bottom, a depressed SpongeBob sets out to return to gainful employment wherever he can find it. No spoilers—but it's safe to say that our hero doesn't end up on food stamps, as his patty-making skills turn out to be in high demand.'" Civil rights activist and talk show host Al Sharpton of MSNBC later covered this debate in the October 31 episode of PoliticsNation, criticizing the right-wing media outlets for using the show as a talking point in their argument against government assistance programs.

Nickelodeon declined to comment on the issue caused by the message of the episode. However, Russell Hicks of Nickelodeon said the show is "tapping into the news of the moment," but did not specifically address any political leanings or ideologies within the episode.

== Merchandising ==
Nickelodeon and Random House released a book based on the episode called You're Fired!. The book is illustrated by David Aikins and was released on January 7, 2014. "SpongeBob, You're Fired!" was released on a DVD compilation of the same name on April 29, 2014, by Nickelodeon and Paramount Home Entertainment. The DVD includes the episode itself, "Neptune's Spatula", "Welcome to the Chum Bucket", "The Original Fry Cook", "Le Big Switch", "Model Sponge", "Employee of the Month", "Bossy Boots", "Krusty Dogs", "License to Milkshake", "Help Wanted", "Wet Painters", "Krusty Krab Training Video", and "Pizza Delivery", all of which are episodes centered around the Krusty Krab. On October 10, 2017, "SpongeBob, You're Fired!" was released on the SpongeBob SquarePants: The Complete Ninth Season DVD, alongside all episodes of the ninth season. On June 4, 2019, "SpongeBob, You're Fired!" was released on the SpongeBob SquarePants: The Next 100 Episodes DVD, alongside all the episodes of seasons six through nine.
