= Arturo Castro =

Arturo Castro may refer to:

- Arturo Castro (Mexican actor) (1918–1975)
- Arturo Castro (Guatemalan actor) (born 1985)
