= Extreme Spots =

- SpongeBob SquarePants episode
- Title card
- Episode no.: Season 9 Episode 1a
- Directed by: Tom Yasumi (animation); Luke Brookshier (storyboard); Marc Ceccarelli (storyboard); Alan Smart (supervising)
- Written by: Luke Brookshier; Marc Ceccarelli; Derek Iversen
- Production code: 325-902
- Original air date: July 21, 2012

Guest appearance
- Johnny Knoxville as Johnny Krill

Episode chronology
← Previous "Hello Bikini Bottom!"	Next → "Squirrel Record"
- SpongeBob SquarePants (season 9)

"Extreme Spots" is the first half of the first episode of the ninth season and the 179th overall episode of the American animated television series SpongeBob SquarePants. The episode originally aired on Nickelodeon in the United States on July 21, 2012. The series follows the adventures and endeavors of SpongeBob and his various friends in the underwater city of Bikini Bottom. In this episode, SpongeBob and Patrick try to join an extreme sports team called The Drasticals by completing dangerous and extreme tasks.

The episode was written by Luke Brookshier, Marc Ceccarelli, (who both are also storyboard directors) and Derek Iversen, and the animation was directed by Tom Yasumi. The episode features the guest appearance of Johnny Knoxville as the voice of Johnny Krill. Upon release, the episode drew 3.7 million viewers and was met with positive reviews.

== Plot summary ==
SpongeBob and Patrick play in the sand on Sand Mountain when they see an extreme sports team named The Drasticals, consisting of Johnny Krill, Not Dead Ted, and Grand Maul Granny. A British fish tells SpongeBob and Patrick about The Drasticals, with Patrick mishearing "extreme sports" as "extreme spots" due to the fish's lisp, then getting stung by jellyfish to get "extreme spots." Johnny laughs and tells SpongeBob to try motorbiking to see if he is good at extreme sports, while Patrick sandboards down the mountain with Granny.

The sports are too "extreme" for SpongeBob and Patrick, and they jump rope instead. Patrick quickly gets tired, and The Drasticals demonstrate "extreme" jumping rope, with Ted lighting on fire and jumping into a plane. SpongeBob and Patrick then blow bubbles, which the Drasticals make extreme by having Johnny ride his motorcycle inside a bubble and knock over a building. SpongeBob boxes a pillow and loses, which Johnny puts in a washing machine and is attacked by a living mattress. Patrick demonstrates dumpster diving, which Granny takes further by having the trash compacted with her still in it.

SpongeBob and Patrick show that they like to catch jellyfish, which gets The Drasticals injured and covered in welts. Johnny admits that the spots are "way extreme," and the British fish says that extreme spots come from extreme sports. The episode ends with Patrick asking, "Who is that guy?"

== Production ==
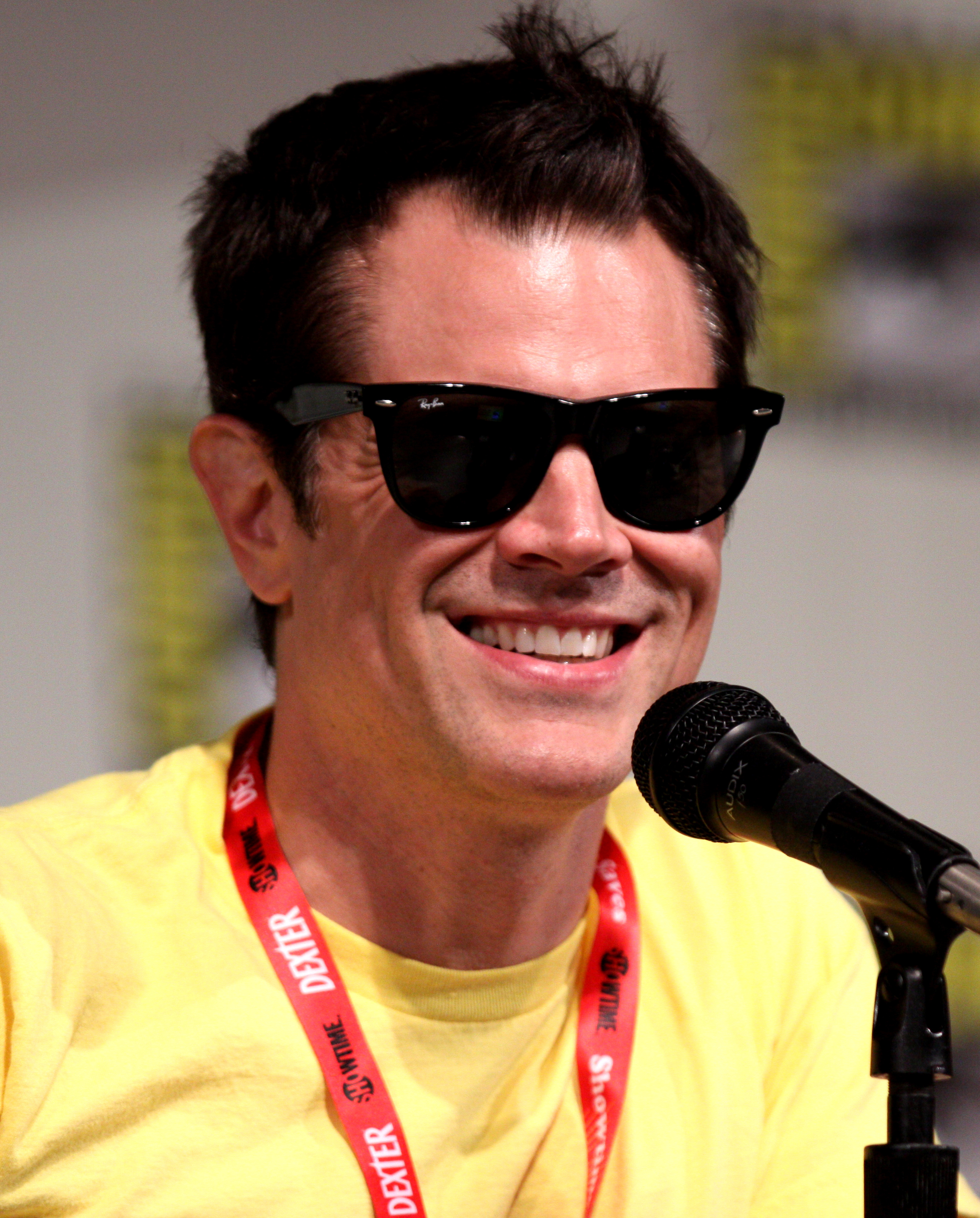
Actor Johnny Knoxville, shown here in 2011, guest starred in the episode as the voice of Johnny Krill.

"Extreme Spots" was written by Luke Brookshier, Marc Ceccarelli, and Derek Iversen, and the animation was directed by Tom Yasumi. Brookshier and Ceccarelli also functioned as storyboard directors. The episode was the first regular-length episode to be produced in high-definition. It originally aired on Nickelodeon in the United States on July 21, 2012, with a TV-Y7 parental rating. It was a part of the network's "The Super Spongy Square Games" marathon which debuted sports-themed episodes of the series.

In addition to the regular cast, American stunt performer and Jackass actor Johnny Knoxville guest starred in the episode as the voice of Johnny Krill, the leader of an extreme sports team called the Drasticals and a champion of undersea extreme sports. The writing staff wrote the episode specifically for Knoxville. Executive producer Paul Tibbitt said "[Nickelodeon] wanted to do a show about extreme sports and the first thing that came to mind was Johnny Knoxville, because there are few humans living that are as extreme as him." Knoxville accepted the role because he is a fan of the show. Knoxville said "I got a lot of street cred in the office for doing SpongeBob. Everyone is psyched[...] As soon as I was done recording this episode, I started begging them to let me come back and record another one." Knoxville asked if he needed to come up with a funny voice for his character. However, the producers said "No, we want [your voice]." Knoxville claimed that "it's not easy" providing a vocal cameo. He added "It's a different kind of work."

Aside from providing vocal cameo, Knoxville also did a photo shoot with a SpongeBob plush toy for the episode. Knoxville said "They loaded me up with a bunch of schwag! Every toy they ever made—skateboards, wristbands, all kinds of great stuff. They just don't quit with the perks." He added "They [the crews] let me do my own stunts for this episode. It was amazing."

== Merchandising ==
On January 15, 2013, "Extreme Spots" became available on the DVD compilation SpongeBob SquarePants: Extreme Kah-Rah-Tay along with fellow eighth and ninth-season episodes "Squid Defense", "The Way of the Sponge", "House Sittin' For Sandy", "The Krabby Patty That Ate Bikini Bottom", "Squirrel Record", "Face Freeze!", and "Demolition Doofus". On October 10, 2017, "Extreme Spots" was released on the SpongeBob SquarePants: The Complete Ninth Season DVD, alongside all episodes of the ninth season. On June 4, 2019, "Extreme Spots" was released on the SpongeBob SquarePants: The Next 100 Episodes DVD, alongside all the episodes of seasons six through nine.

== Reception ==
The premiere of "Extreme Spots" on July 21, 2012, as part of "The Super Spongy Square Games" marathon scored 3.7 million total viewers, ranking as the most watched kids program among total viewers for the entire week. The episode, alongside "Squirrel Record", "Demolition Doofus", and "Face Freeze!", posted a double-digit increase with kid demographic, averaging 5.57 million Kids 2-11 (+50%) from 2011.

"Extreme Spots" received positive reviews from critics. Paul Mavis of DVD Talk enjoyed the episode and said: "'Extreme Spots' gets big laughs from some very funny bits." He added that the "stereotypical Britisher fish, complete with monocle and bad teeth, is a scream." In his review for the Inside Pulse, Joe Corey said that the episode is "equally dangerous" with the remaining episodes of the Extreme Kah-Rah-Tay DVD.
