= Goodbye, Krabby Patty? =

- SpongeBob SquarePants episode
- Title card
- Episode no.: Season 9 Episode 22
- Directed by: Alan Smart (animation and supervising); Tom Yasumi (animation); Fred Osmond (storyboard); Sherm Cohen (supervising); Dave Cunningham (supervising)
- Written by: Kyle McCulloch
- Production code: 325-972/325-973
- Original air date: February 20, 2017
- Running time: 22 minutes (without commercials)

Guest appearance
- Jon Hamm as Don Grouper

Episode chronology
| ← Previous "Lame and Fortune" | Next → "Sandy's Nutmare" |
- SpongeBob SquarePants season 9

"Goodbye, Krabby Patty?", also known as "Factory Fresh", is the 22nd episode of season 9 and the 200th overall episode of SpongeBob SquarePants. The episode originally aired on Nickelodeon and Nicktoons in the United States as a simulcast on February 20, 2017.

In the episode, SpongeBob and Mr. Krabs seek business advice from an ad executive in Mr. Krabs' endeavor to launch a line of frozen Krabby Patties. Once Mr. Krabs gains success from this, he stops selling fresh Krabby Patties and turns the Krusty Krab into a museum. This meant SpongeBob had to save the Krabby Patty, as well as his friendship with Patrick. There were five shorts that were shown on February 18, 2017, for the special before it aired. This episode was the only one aired in 2017 during the ninth season as well as the final episode of season 9 to air.

The episode was written by Kyle McCulloch, storyboarded by Fred Osmond, and directed by Sherm Cohen and Dave Cunningham, with Alan Smart and Tom Yasumi serving as animation directors. The episode features the guest appearance of Jon Hamm as the voice of Don Grouper. Upon release, the episode drew 2.67 million viewers, and was met with positive reviews.

== Plot ==
SpongeBob and Patrick decide to go to the Barg'N-Mart to buy ice cream. Mr. Krabs then walks by and grabs a box full of frozen food, at which he marvels because of its convenience. SpongeBob sees this and gets the idea to sell frozen Krabby Patties, speculating that people will buy them. Mr. Krabs, along with the help of SpongeBob and his daughter Pearl, create their own advertisement for the Frozen Krabby Patty. Businessman Don Grouper decides to help Mr. Krabs create an ad campaign to promote the Frozen Krabby Patty, with Patrick becoming the brand ambassador. After the first commercial airs, Grouper tells Mr. Krabs that he will make even more money if he changes the recipe and adds some "filler", much to SpongeBob's dismay. The new Patties are a monstrous success, and everyone seems to be enjoying them, despite some noticeable side effects.

Mr. Krabs fires SpongeBob from his fry cook job, and then immediately rehires him to work in the Krusty Krab museum, which documents the complete history of the Krusty Krab. Patrick becomes a major celebrity due to the success of the new commercials, but begins ignoring his friendship with SpongeBob. Accepting his new role, SpongeBob eats a frozen Krabby Patty and discovers that they are made of sand. SpongeBob reads the Krabby Patty secret formula and cooks up a fresh one, telling Patrick that the Patties are made of sand. SpongeBob then gives Patrick the one he just cooked, reminding him of his preference for the original Patty. At a shareholder meeting for the company, Patrick reveals that the Patties are made of sand, exposing Don Grouper as a fraud and shutting down the factory. Mr. Krabs returns to the Krusty Krab, where he returns to his role as SpongeBob's boss.

== Production ==
This special of SpongeBob was written by Kyle McCulloch, storyboarded by Fred Osmond, and directed by Sherm Cohen and Dave Cunningham, with Alan Smart and Tom Yasumi serving as animation directors.

== Reception ==
"Goodbye, Krabby Patty?" was watched by 2.67 million viewers on the day of its premiere. Bubbleblabber's John Schwarz rated the episode a 9.5 out of 10, highlighting its strong pacing, consistent comedy, and Jon Hamm's guest performance.

== Merchandising ==
Nickelodeon and Little Golden Books released a book based on the episode called Factory Fresh! The book is illustrated by Harry Moore and was released on January 3, 2017. On October 10, 2017, "Goodbye, Krabby Patty?" was released on the SpongeBob SquarePants: The Complete Ninth Season DVD, alongside all episodes of the ninth season. On June 4, 2019, "Goodbye, Krabby Patty?" was released on the SpongeBob SquarePants: The Next 100 Episodes DVD, alongside all the episodes of seasons six through nine.
