= SpongeBob SquarePants season 9 =

Season of television series

SpongeBob SquarePants
- Season 9
- DVD cover
- Showrunners: Paul Tibbitt (episodes 1–11); Marc Ceccarelli; Vincent Waller (episodes 12–26)
- Starring: Tom Kenny; Bill Fagerbakke; Rodger Bumpass; Clancy Brown; Mr. Lawrence; Jill Talley; Carolyn Lawrence; Mary Jo Catlett; Lori Alan
- No. of episodes: 26 (49 segments)

Release
- Original network: Nickelodeon
- Original release: July 21, 2012 – February 20, 2017

Season chronology
- ← Previous; Season 8 Next → Season 10

The ninth season of the American animated television series SpongeBob SquarePants, created by animator and former marine biologist Stephen Hillenburg, originally aired on Nickelodeon in the United States from July 21, 2012, to February 20, 2017, and contained 26 half-hour episodes. The series chronicles the adventures of SpongeBob SquarePants and his friends in the fictional underwater city of Bikini Bottom. The season was executive produced by series creator Hillenburg and writer Paul Tibbitt, who also acted as the showrunner for the first 11 episodes of the season. Starting with "Lost in Bikini Bottom", Marc Ceccarelli and Vincent Waller became the supervising producers and showrunners and served in that position for the rest of the season.

This season marks the show's transition to 1080i HDTV by now having episodes produced and aired in widescreen (16:9), the native aspect ratio of high-definition.

The season was first announced on October 4, 2010. A total of 26 episodes were produced for the season, bringing the number of episodes up to 204. The ninth season is the longest-running season of SpongeBob SquarePants to date, airing for four and a half years. The SpongeBob SquarePants: The Complete Ninth Season DVD was released in region 1 on October 10, 2017, and region 4 on October 7, 2020.

== Production ==
The season's executive producers were series creator Stephen Hillenburg and Paul Tibbitt, who also acted as the series' showrunner. During production of the eighth season, Deadline Hollywood reported on October 4, 2010, that Nickelodeon had renewed the series for a ninth season, with 26 episodes in order, which would push the series over the 200th episode mark. SpongeBob SquarePants became the sixth Nickelodeon series with most episodes, surpassing Rugrats with 172 episodes, having 178 after the eighth season had completed broadcast on television.

On July 21, 2012, the season premiered with the episode "Extreme Spots"/"Squirrel Record" during a SpongeBob SquarePants television marathon event called "The Super Spongy Square Games". The episode "Extreme Spots" was written by Luke Brookshier, Marc Ceccarelli, and Derek Iversen, while Tom Yasumi served as animation director. It was guest starred by actor Johnny Knoxville. Moreover, "Squirrel Record" was written by Brookshier, Ceccarelli and Iversen, and Alan Smart served as animation director. During the television event, Nickelodeon also debuted – "Face Freeze!" and "Demolition Doofus" – of the eighth season. The animation took place in South Korea at Rough Draft Studios. Production also switched to high-definition in the season; the first episode "Extreme Spots", aired July 21, 2012. Episodes were written by a team of writers, which consisted of Casey Alexander, Josh Androsky, Brookshier, Ceccarelli, Zeus Cervas, Daniel Dominguez, Solomon Georgio, Andrew Goodman, Iversen, Clare O'Kane, Kyle McCulloch, Mr. Lawrence, Blake Lemons, Jack Pendarvis, and Kaz. The season was storyboarded by Alexander, Chris Allison, Ed Baker, Brookshier, Bob Camp, Ceccarelli, Cervas, Ryan Kramer, Chong Lee, Blake Lemons, Brian Morante, Lynne Naylor, Shellie O'Brien, Fred Osmond, Howie Perry, John Trabbic, and Joe Wierenga. The animation directors were Alan Smart and Tom Yasumi. (Note: Information is taken from the opening credits of each episode.) This is the first season to be produced in high-definition.

Production on season nine was temporarily suspended in 2013 so the show's staff could work on The SpongeBob Movie: Sponge Out of Water. According to an interview with Princess Grace Foundation-USA, creator Stephen Hillenburg said he would return for the show following production on the film.

Season nine resumed when a new two-segment episode led into the 2015 Kids' Choice Sports on July 16, 2015; Viacom claimed at the beginning of the year that several new episodes would premiere over the summer of 2015, but only "Lost in Bikini Bottom"/"Tutor Sauce" and "Squid Plus One"/"The Executive Treatment" aired before the end of Labor Day on September 7, which is the effective end of Nickelodeon's summer season. During this season, the series diverged from its long-standing storyboard-driven writing format (in which the storyboard artists write the episodes as they draw its storyboard), instead opting for a script-driven format. In October 2015, Vincent Waller and Marc Ceccarelli took Paul Tibbitt's place as showrunners.

== Cast ==
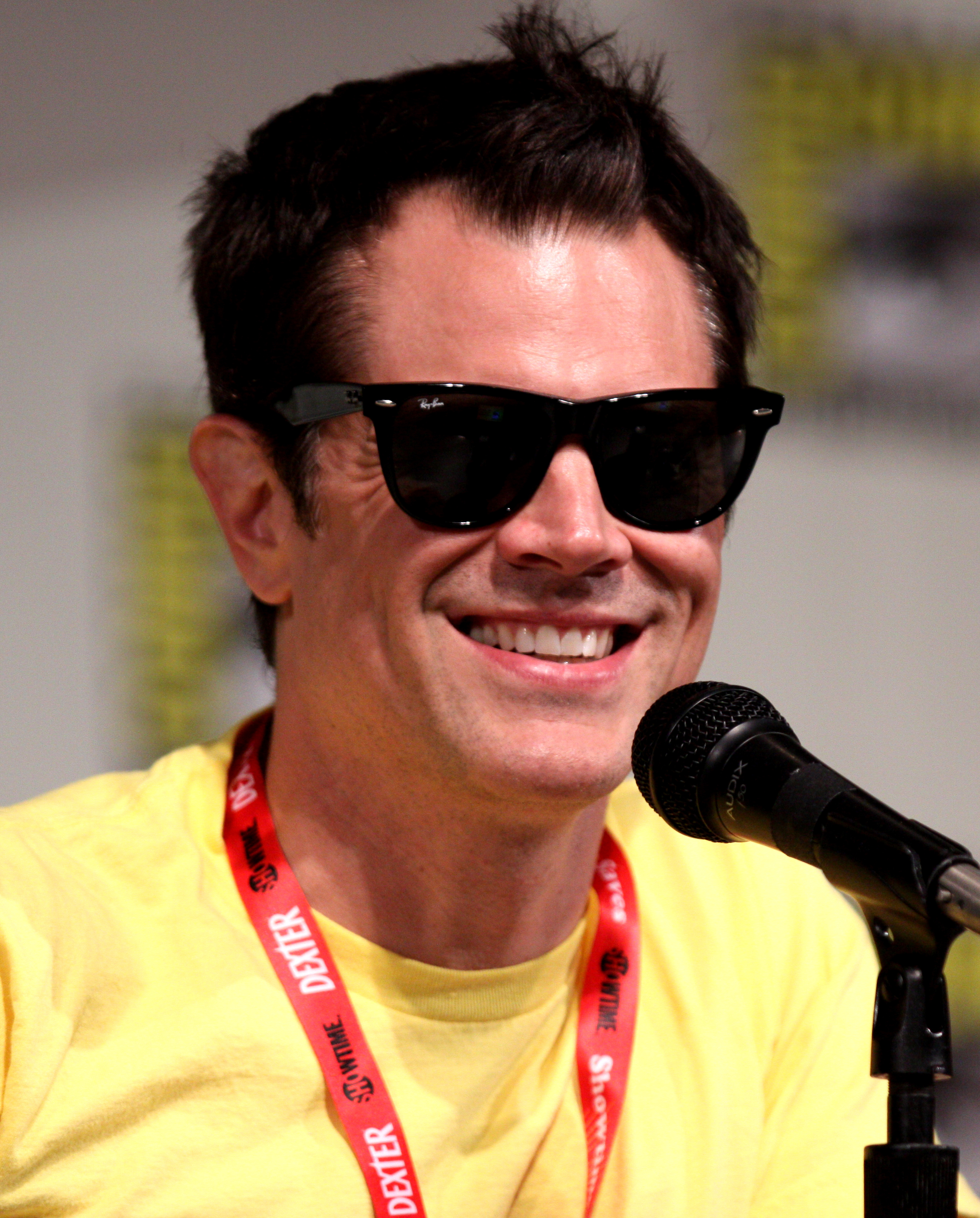
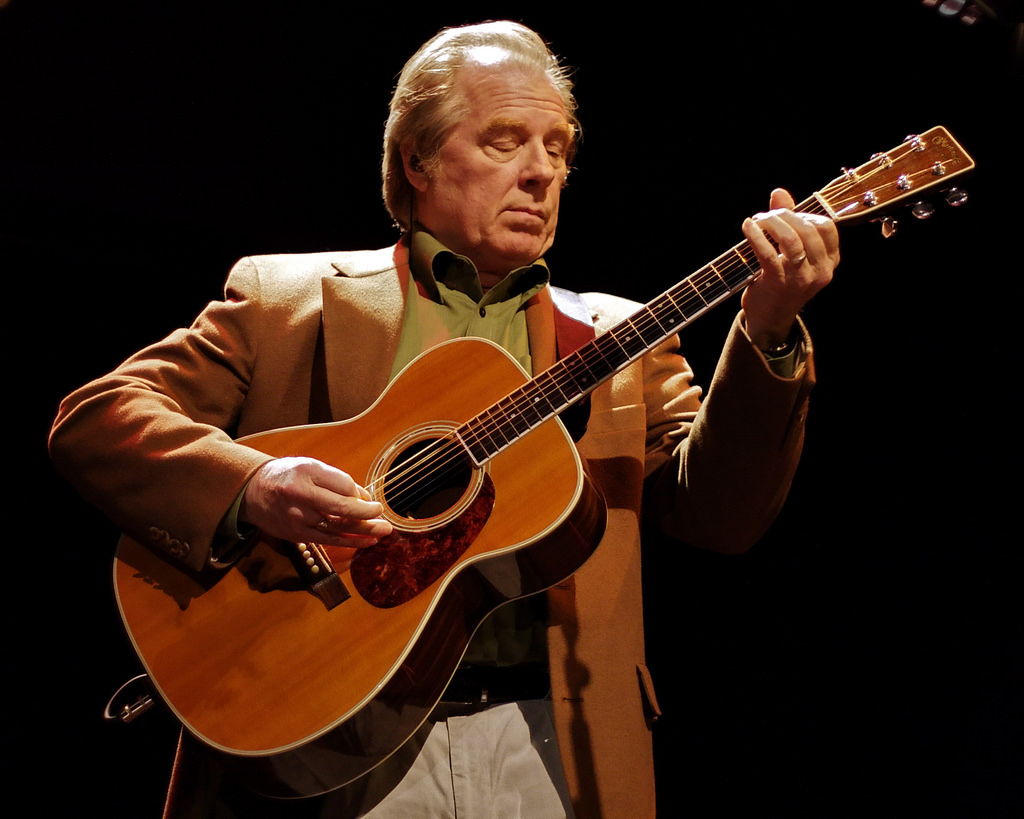
Stunt performer Johnny Knoxville (left) guest starred in "Extreme Spots" as Johnny Krill, while Michael McKean voiced the characters of Captain Frostymug in "License to Milkshake" and Lonnie the Shark in "Sharks vs. Pods".

The ninth season featured Tom Kenny as the voice of the title character SpongeBob SquarePants and his pet snail Gary. SpongeBob's best friend, a starfish named Patrick Star, was voiced by Bill Fagerbakke, while Rodger Bumpass played the voice of Squidward Tentacles, an arrogant and ill-tempered octopus. Other members of the cast were Clancy Brown as Mr. Krabs, a miserly crab obsessed with money who's SpongeBob's boss at the Krusty Krab; Mr. Lawrence as Plankton, a small green copepod and Mr. Krabs' business rival; Jill Talley as Karen, Plankton's sentient computer sidekick; Carolyn Lawrence as Sandy Cheeks, a squirrel from Texas; Mary Jo Catlett as Mrs. Puff, SpongeBob's boating school teacher; and Lori Alan as Pearl, a teenage whale who is Mr. Krabs' daughter.

In addition to the regular cast members, episodes feature guest voices from many ranges of professions, including actors, musicians, and artists. For instance, the season premiere "Extreme Spots" was guest starred by American stunt performer and Jackass actor Johnny Knoxville voicing the character of Johnny Krill. The writing staff wrote the episode specifically for Knoxville. Executive producer Paul Tibbitt said, "[Nickelodeon] wanted to do a show about extreme sports and the first thing that came to mind was Johnny Knoxville, because there are few humans living that are as extreme as him." Knoxville accepted the role because he is a fan of the show.

Ernest Borgnine and Tim Conway returned, reprising their respective roles as Mermaid Man and Barnacle Boy in "Patrick-Man!". The episode was Borgnine's last voice-over work for the series as, on July 8, 2012, he died at the age of 95. The episode also marked as being Conway's final voice-over work for the series before his death on May 14, 2019, at the age of 85, though he returned to the franchise as the voice of a seagull in The SpongeBob Movie: Sponge Out of Water, released in 2015. The characters were retired after this episode due to Borgnine's death prior to its release and have since been reduced to silent background cameos. In "License to Milkshake", comedian and Spinal Tap band member Michael McKean guest starred as the voice of Captain Frostymug. Rapper Biz Markie guest appeared as Kenny the Cat in the episode of the same name. In "The Executive Treatment", an American stage actor, comedian and director, Frank Ferrante, guest-starred as the voice of Stockholder Eel. In "Sanctuary!", former Price is Right host Bob Barker guest starred as the voice of Bob Barnacle. In "Mall Girl Pearl", comedian legend Betty White and Aubrey Plaza guest starred as the voices of Beatrice and Nocturna. In "Sharks vs. Pods", Michael McKean returned and he voiced a new different character, Lonnie the Shark, along with Henry Winkler and David Lander as Sharkface and Donnie the Shark. Jon Hamm guest starred in "Goodbye, Krabby Patty?" as the voice of the business executive Don Grouper.

== Reception ==
=== Critical reception ===
The season received mixed to positive reviews from media critics. In a DVD review for a season release, Paul Mavis of DVD Talk was positive on the episode "Extreme Spots", writing "[It] gets big laughs from some very funny bits, including a motorcycle ripping off SpongeBob's arms, and SpongeBob's pathetic attempts at 'extreme jump roping' and 'extreme pillow fighting.'" However, the episode "Squirrel Record" was described by Mavis as "the weakest entry" on the set.

The episode "Gary's New Toy" received a nomination at the 2013 Golden Reel Awards for the Best Sound Editing – Sound Effects, Foley, Dialogue and ADR Animation in Television category. The show itself also received recognition. At the 40th Daytime Emmy Awards, the series was nominated for Outstanding Achievement in Sound Editing – Animation. The show won the 2013 Kids' Choice Awards for Favorite Cartoon, and the ASCAP Film and Television Awards for Top Television Series. At the BMI Film & TV Awards, the show won the BMI Cable Award. Sarah Noonan was nominated at the Artios Awards of the Casting Society of America, and the episode "Company Picnic" was nominated for an Emmy for "Outstanding Short-format Animated Program". The ninth season was also nominated for a Producer's Guild Award in 2017.

=== Political controversy ===
In 2013, the episode "SpongeBob, You're Fired" was involved in a political debate among the media surrounding the Supplemental Nutrition Assistance Program (Food Stamps benefit). During a scene from the episode, Patrick Star tried to show SpongeBob "the benefits of being unemployed", at which he said in response, "Unemployment may be fun for you, but I need to get a job." The scene was meant to demonstrate the title character's "eternal optimism and willingness to get back to work", and "do it in a way that's still funny and relatable". However, some political activists claimed that this scene was a "slam" to the Food Stamps benefit. A report by The Hollywood Reporter claimed that the episode may have a political agenda about the social safety net, adding that the series is usually left-leaning when it comes to the social commentary of some episodes. This sparked a political debate, after the New York Post and Fox News remarked on the episode. Media Matters for America, a politically progressive media watchdog group, responded, saying that the attacking news media, both owned by media tycoon Rupert Murdoch, were using the episode "to slam poor people who use social services".

Mediaite, another website focused on the news media, argued that the talking heads were "using the firing of fictional cartoon character SpongeBob SquarePants to attack the social safety net and those who rely on it", noting that it's not the first time that right-wing media has criticized the social safety net. Media Matters was "also particularly bothered by [a] line from The Post's piece: "Lest he sit around idly, mooching off the social services of Bikini Bottom, a depressed SpongeBob sets out to return to gainful employment wherever he can find it," reporter Andrea Morabito wrote. "No spoilers – but it's safe to say that our hero doesn't end up on food stamps, as his patty-making skills turn out to be in high demand. Furthermore, the coverage from Fox News prompted civil rights activist, and talk show host Al Sharpton of MSNBC to remark in the October 31 episode of PoliticsNation, criticizing the right-wing media outlets for using SpongeBob SquarePants as a talking point in their argument against government help programs.

Nickelodeon declined to comment on the issue caused by the message of the episode. However, Russell Hicks of Nickelodeon said the show is "tapping into the news of the moment," but did not specifically address any political leanings or ideologies within the episode.

== Episodes ==
The episodes are ordered below according to Nickelodeon's packaging order, and not their original production or broadcast order.

No. overall	No. in season	Title	Directed by (Note: From #179A "Extreme Spots" to #189 "SpongeBob, You're Fired", only animation directors are credited. Following the series' transition from a board-driven format to a script-driven one with #190A "Lost in Bikini Bottom," storyboard supervisors (later referred to as supervising directors beginning with #197A "Mall Girl Pearl") are also listed in the opening and end credits.)	Written by	Original release date	Prod. code	U.S. viewers (millions)
Part 1
179	1	"Extreme Spots"	Tom Yasumi	Written by : Luke Brookshier, Marc Ceccarelli, and Derek Iversen; Storyboarded by : Luke Brookshier and Marc Ceccarelli (directors)	July 21, 2012	325–902	3.65
179	1	"Squirrel Record"	Alan Smart	Written by : Luke Brookshier, Marc Ceccarelli, and Derek Iversen; Storyboarded by : Luke Brookshier and Marc Ceccarelli (directors)	July 21, 2012	325–901	3.65
"Extreme Spots": SpongeBob and Patrick are determined to join an extreme sports group called the Drasticals. "Squirrel Record": Upon finding a world record book in the Krusty Krab's dumpster, Sandy is determined to break all the records. SpongeBob joins her, but soon worries that she is getting too obsessed and tries to destroy the record book.
180	2	"Patrick-Man!"	Alan Smart	Written by : Casey Alexander, Zeus Cervas, and Derek Iversen; Storyboarded by : Casey Alexander and Zeus Cervas (directors)	October 27, 2012	325–907	3.78
180	2	"Gary's New Toy"	Tom Yasumi	Written by : Marc Ceccarelli and Derek Iversen; Storyboarded by : Marc Ceccarelli (director)	October 14, 2012	325–906	2.28
"Patrick-Man!": Bored with his life, Patrick is inspired by Mermaid Man and Barnacle Boy to become a superhero. He attempts to stop crimes in Bikini Bottom, doing more harm than good, until he unmasks the Dirty Bubble in the Krusty Krab. "Gary's New Toy": SpongeBob buys Gary a red ball, but worries when Gary is obsessed with the ball and seems to care about it more than him.
181	3	"License to Milkshake"	Tom Yasumi	Written by : Casey Alexander, Zeus Cervas, and Mr. Lawrence; Storyboarded by : Casey Alexander and Zeus Cervas (directors)	September 7, 2012	325–915	3.13
181	3	"Squid Baby"	Alan Smart	Written by : Casey Alexander, Zeus Cervas, and Mr. Lawrence; Storyboarded by : Casey Alexander and Zeus Cervas (directors)	September 3, 2012	325–905	3.36
"License to Milkshake": When SpongeBob's milkshake license expires, he enrolls in the militaristic Milkshake Academy to renew it. "Squid Baby": Squidward gets into a severe accident that causes his brain to swell up and he physically and mentally regresses to the state of a baby. SpongeBob and Patrick take care of him until he recovers.
182	4	"Little Yellow Book"	Alan Smart	Written by : Luke Brookshier, Marc Ceccarelli, and Derek Iversen; Storyboarded by : Luke Brookshier and Marc Ceccarelli (directors)	March 2, 2013	325–916	4.73
182	4	"Bumper to Bumper"	Alan Smart	Written by : Casey Alexander, Zeus Cervas, and Mr. Lawrence; Storyboarded by : Casey Alexander and Zeus Cervas (directors)	November 17, 2012	325–904	4.01
"Little Yellow Book": Squidward discovers SpongeBob's diary, and reads it to the customers of the Krusty Krab. SpongeBob is devastated, and Squidward is shunned by the town for invading his privacy. "Bumper to Bumper": Following another failed driving test, Mrs. Puff realizes that SpongeBob is afraid of the driving course, and takes him to an empty desert road to practice. While repeating a surreal mantra, SpongeBob is able to succeed at first, until he mistakenly drives into a busy intersection.
183	5	"Eek, an Urchin!"	Alan Smart	Written by : Marc Ceccarelli, Luke Brookshier, and Mr. Lawrence; Storyboarded by : Marc Ceccarelli and Luke Brookshier (directors)	October 27, 2012	325–921	3.78
183	5	"Squid Defense"	Tom Yasumi	Written by : Casey Alexander, Zeus Cervas, Blake Lemons, and Derek Iversen; Storyboarded by : Casey Alexander, Zeus Cervas and Blake Lemons (directors)	January 1, 2013	325–911	3.70
"Eek, an Urchin!": SpongeBob, Squidward, Mr. Krabs, and Plankton team up to get rid of an urchin in the Krusty Krab. "Squid Defense": Squidward is attacked in a dark alley and has his groceries stolen. He takes up karate training for self-defense with SpongeBob and Sandy.
184	6	"Jailbreak!"	Alan Smart	Written by : Marc Ceccarelli, Luke Brookshier, and Mr. Lawrence; Storyboarded by : Marc Ceccarelli and Luke Brookshier (directors)	March 16, 2013	325–909	3.81
184	6	"Evil Spatula"	Alan Smart and Tom Yasumi	Written by : Casey Alexander, Zeus Cervas, Blake Lemons, and Andrew Goodman; Storyboarded by : Casey Alexander, Zeus Cervas and Blake Lemons (directors)	March 9, 2013	325–924	4.04
"Jailbreak!": Plankton is sentenced to jail, where he is highly respected by the prisoners for his continual schemes. He and the other criminals make a plan to break out of jail and then steal the Krabby Patty formula. "Evil Spatula": Plankton breaks SpongeBob's spatula and gives him a high-tech one, which he remotely controls and speaks out of from the Chum Bucket. After earning SpongeBob's respect, Plankton attempts to sabotage his job.
185	7	"It Came from Goo Lagoon"	Alan Smart and Tom Yasumi	Written by : Marc Ceccarelli, Luke Brookshier, Derek Iversen, and Mr. Lawrence; Storyboarded by : Marc Ceccarelli and Luke Brookshier (directors)	February 17, 2014	325–917	4.04
185	7	"It Came from Goo Lagoon"	Alan Smart and Tom Yasumi	Written by : Marc Ceccarelli, Luke Brookshier, Derek Iversen, and Mr. Lawrence; Storyboarded by : Marc Ceccarelli and Luke Brookshier (directors)	February 17, 2014	325–918	4.04
Purple goo bubbles begin to rise from Goo Lagoon. SpongeBob, Patrick, Squidward, and the other beachgoers have fun with the goo, while Sandy is insistent that they are dangerous. It is revealed to be a plot by Plankton, who attempts to destroy the Krusty Krab using a giant goo bubble.
186	8	"Safe Deposit Krabs"	Alan Smart	Written by : Casey Alexander, Zeus Cervas, Blake Lemons, and Derek Iversen; Storyboarded by : Casey Alexander, Zeus Cervas and Blake Lemons (directors)	May 25, 2013	325–931	4.18
186	8	"Plankton's Pet"	Alan Smart and Tom Yasumi	Written by : Marc Ceccarelli, Luke Brookshier, and Mr. Lawrence; Storyboarded by : Marc Ceccarelli and Luke Brookshier, (directors)	January 19, 2013	325–934	4.37
"Safe Deposit Krabs": When a new bank opens in Bikini Bottom, Mr. Krabs gets a safe deposit box where he is trapped inside and finds his way into the bank's vault. SpongeBob and Patrick try to break into the vault, while Mr. Krabs slowly goes insane and hallucinates from oxygen deprivation. "Plankton's Pet": To take his mind off the Krabby Patty formula, Plankton adopts a pet amoeba, whom he names Spot. Plankton has fun with Spot, until he runs away, and Plankton gets SpongeBob's help to find him.
187	9	"Don't Look Now"	Tom Yasumi	Written by : Marc Ceccarelli, Luke Brookshier, and Mr. Lawrence; Storyboarded by : Marc Ceccarelli and Luke Brookshier, (directors)	October 14, 2013	325–938	3.42
187	9	"Séance Shméance"	Alan Smart and Tom Yasumi	Written by : Casey Alexander, Zeus Cervas, and Mr. Lawrence; Storyboarded by : Casey Alexander and Zeus Cervas (directors)	October 14, 2013	325–937	3.42
"Don't Look Now": SpongeBob and Patrick are paranoid after watching a horror movie. Their panicky behavior keeps Squidward awake, and he dresses up as the antagonist of the movie to frighten them. "Séance Shméance": Old Man Jenkins orders a sandwich that the Krusty Krab does not sell. SpongeBob finds that this sandwich comes from a restaurant demolished years ago, and conducts a séance to speak to the restaurant's owner and learn the recipe.
188	10	"Kenny the Cat"	Tom Yasumi	Written by : Casey Alexander, Zeus Cervas, Blake Lemons, and Mr. Lawrence; Storyboarded by : Casey Alexander, Zeus Cervas and Blake Lemons (directors)	March 29, 2014	325–927	4.33
188	10	"Yeti Krabs"	Alan Smart	Written by : Casey Alexander, Zeus Cervas, and Mr. Lawrence; Storyboarded by : Casey Alexander and Zeus Cervas (directors)	March 29, 2015	325–940	2.25
"Kenny the Cat": SpongeBob is obsessed with media sensation Kenny the Cat, who can hold his breath underwater for long periods of time. When Kenny visits Bikini Bottom, Sandy becomes skeptical. SpongeBob finds that Kenny is a fraud and uses an oxygen mask in private, but is convinced by Kenny not to tell anyone and ruin his popularity. "Yeti Krabs": On a slow day at the Krusty Krab, Squidward refuses to work. Mr. Krabs comes up with a story about a yeti crab that eats lazy employees. When a real yeti crab shows up, Squidward believes it is Mr. Krabs in disguise, and SpongeBob tries working twice as hard to make up for Squidward's laziness.
189	11	"SpongeBob, You're Fired"	Alan Smart and Tom Yasumi	Written by : Marc Ceccarelli, Luke Brookshier, and Mr. Lawrence; Storyboarded by : Marc Ceccarelli and Luke Brookshier (directors)	November 11, 2013	325–941	5.19
189	11	"SpongeBob, You're Fired"	Alan Smart and Tom Yasumi	Written by : Marc Ceccarelli, Luke Brookshier, and Mr. Lawrence; Storyboarded by : Marc Ceccarelli and Luke Brookshier (directors)	November 11, 2013	325–942	5.19
When Mr. Krabs wants to save five cents, he fires SpongeBob from his job. SpongeBob falls into depression, and despite encouragement from Patrick, finds that he does not enjoy being unemployed. He takes his talents to multiple other restaurants, making Krabby Patty-style food that turns out to be delicious.
Part 2
190	12	"Lost in Bikini Bottom"	Alan Smart and Tom Yasumi (animation), Sherm Cohen (storyboard supervision)	Written by : Jack Pendarvis; Storyboarded by : Bob Camp	July 16, 2015	325–939	2.76
190	12	"Tutor Sauce"	Alan Smart and Tom Yasumi (animation), Sherm Cohen (storyboard supervision)	Written by : Jack Pendarvis; Storyboarded by : Fred Osmond	July 16, 2015	325–935	2.76
"Lost in Bikini Bottom": SpongeBob tries to take a shortcut to work, but ends up lost in the bad side of town. "Tutor Sauce": Mr. Krabs teaches SpongeBob how to drive, but starts losing his patience.
191	13	"Squid Plus One"	Alan Smart and Tom Yasumi (animation), Dave Cunningham (storyboard supervision)	Written by : Kyle McCulloch and Jack Pendarvis; Storyboarded by : Fred Osmond	September 7, 2015	325–945	1.98
191	13	"The Executive Treatment"	Alan Smart and Tom Yasumi (animation), Sherm Cohen (storyboard supervision)	Written by : Jack Pendarvis; Storyboarded by : Fred Osmond	September 7, 2015	325–923	1.98
"Squid Plus One": Squidward receives an invitation to a gallery opening. Not wanting to be seen as a loser, he tries to find a friend to take with him, spending time with both the mailman and Larry. Both attempts fail due to the mailman hating his favorite hobby and Squidward mocking Larry when he wants to make a protein shake—leading Squidward to go to the opening with himself as the plus one. "The Executive Treatment": Mr. Krabs creates a Krabby Patty only for business executives. Patrick buys a tie and glasses, but before he can receive his sandwich, he is confused for a businessman and taken to an office building. Unable to clear up their mistake, Patrick is involved in a boardroom meeting.
192	14	"Company Picnic"	Alan Smart and Tom Yasumi (animation), Sherm Cohen (storyboard supervision)	Written by : Kyle McCulloch and Jack Pendarvis; Storyboarded by : Lynne Naylor	September 25, 2015	325–919	1.61
192	14	"Pull Up a Barrel"	Alan Smart and Tom Yasumi (animation), Sherm Cohen (storyboard supervision)	Written by : Jack Pendarvis; Storyboarded by : Bob Camp	September 18, 2015	325–949	2.09
"Company Picnic": To boost morale, Mr. Krabs holds a low-budget company picnic. Plankton arrives, holding an extravagant picnic with his two robot employees, in an attempt to get Mr. Krabs and Squidward to work for him. "Pull Up a Barrel": During a thunderstorm, Mr. Krabs tells an old story about his navy days: how his cooking skills were restrained by his mean captain, and how he fought off a pirate invasion.
193	15	"Sanctuary!"	Alan Smart and Tom Yasumi (animation), Dave Cunningham (storyboard supervision)	Written by : Kyle McCulloch; Storyboarded by : Fred Osmond	October 16, 2015	325–933	1.28
193	15	"What's Eating Patrick?"	Alan Smart and Tom Yasumi (animation), Sherm Cohen (storyboard supervision)	Written by : Kyle McCulloch and Jack Pendarvis; Storyboarded by : Joe Wierenga	October 2, 2015	325–953	1.77
"Sanctuary!": SpongeBob starts to take care of many snails. He slowly grows isolated and loses his sanity, while Squidward suffers allergies from the snail slime. "What's Eating Patrick?": Patrick enters a Krabby Patty-eating competition to restore Bikini Bottom's honor.
194	16	"Patrick! The Game"	Alan Smart and Tom Yasumi (animation), Sherm Cohen (storyboard supervision)	Written by : Kyle McCulloch; Storyboarded by : Fred Osmond	November 11, 2015	325–959	2.05
194	16	"The Sewers of Bikini Bottom"	Alan Smart and Tom Yasumi (animation), Dave Cunningham (storyboard supervision)	Written by : Kaz and Derek Iversen; Storyboarded by : Lynne Naylor	November 11, 2015	325–926	2.05
"Patrick! The Game": Patrick creates a new board game consisting of a variety of different games, and invites SpongeBob, Squidward, and Sandy to play it with him. However, Patrick starts to make up rules of the game as they go along. "The Sewers of Bikini Bottom": SpongeBob and Squidward accidentally flush Mr. Krabs's safe containing the Krabby Patty secret formula down the toilet, so they go into the sewers to retrieve it. Meanwhile, Mr. Krabs visits the new Krusty Krab Stadium, which has cheap plumbing systems.
195	17	"SpongeBob LongPants"	Alan Smart and Tom Yasumi (animation), Dave Cunningham (storyboard supervision)	Written by : Kaz; Storyboarded by : Lynne Naylor	February 15, 2016	325–957	2.93
195	17	"Larry's Gym"	Alan Smart and Tom Yasumi (animation), Sherm Cohen (storyboard supervision)	Written by : Jack Pendarvis; Storyboarded by : Fred Osmond	February 15, 2016	325–912	2.93
"SpongeBob LongPants": SpongeBob buys a pair of long pants. He is viewed as fancy and mature, hanging out with a group of wealthy friends, but is conflicted when the Mermaid Man movie he wants to watch is deemed too childish. "Larry's Gym": Larry the Lobster opens a gym. SpongeBob is determined to become stronger, but ends up so muscular that he cannot work properly, while Larry is overwhelmed by amounts of paperwork and is unable to exercise.
196	18	"The Fish Bowl"	Alan Smart and Tom Yasumi (animation), Dave Cunningham (storyboard supervision)	Written by : Kyle McCulloch and Jack Pendarvis; Storyboarded by : John Trabbic	May 2, 2016	325–928	1.96
196	18	"Married to Money"	Alan Smart and Tom Yasumi (animation), Sherm Cohen (storyboard supervision)	Written by : Josh Androsky and Daniel Dominguez; Storyboarded by : Lynne Naylor	May 3, 2016	325–963	1.76
"The Fish Bowl": Sandy reads a book on behavioral psychology, and sets up an observation to see how SpongeBob and Patrick act. Patrick is put in charge, leading him to act bossy when Sandy gives them various tasks. "Married to Money": Mr. Krabs meets and falls in love with an anthropomorphic pile of cash named Cashina. Unknown to Mr. Krabs, Cashina is actually a robot piloted by Plankton who intends to scam Mr. Krabs into giving him the Krabby Patty secret formula.
197	19	"Mall Girl Pearl"	Alan Smart and Tom Yasumi (animation), Sherm Cohen (supervising)	Written by : Clare O'Kane; Storyboarded by : John Trabbic	March 12, 2016	325–964	3.11
197	19	"Two Thumbs Down"	Alan Smart and Tom Yasumi (animation), Dave Cunningham (supervising)	Written by : Kyle McCulloch; Storyboarded by : Fred Osmond	March 12, 2016	325–956	3.11
"Mall Girl Pearl": To earn some money and hang out with her friends, Pearl looks for a job at the mall. The only store that is hiring – Grandma's Apron, which is oriented towards elderly women – is unpopular with her friends. "Two Thumbs Down": SpongeBob gives out too many thumbs-ups, causing him to break his thumbs. Unable to work, he falls into a depression until Sandy encourages him to re-train his thumbs.
198	20	"Sharks vs. Pods"	Tom Yasumi (animation), Sherm Cohen (supervising)	Written by : Solomon Georgio; Storyboarded by : Shellie O'Brien	May 4, 2016	325–946	1.81
198	20	"CopyBob DittoPants"	Alan Smart (animation), Dave Cunningham (supervising)	Written by : Kaz; Storyboarded by : Howie Perry	May 5, 2016	325–961	1.71
"Sharks vs. Pods": SpongeBob joins a gang called the Sharks, but soon learns that they are feared and hated around town. When SpongeBob mistakenly believes the Sharks kidnapped Gary, SpongeBob prepares to fight with them at a showdown, only to find that it is a dance battle, with Gary as the DJ. "CopyBob DittoPants": Plankton clones SpongeBob using a printer. He sends the clones to get the Krabby Patty formula, although SpongeBob interferes by befriending them.
199	21	"Sold!"	Alan Smart and Tom Yasumi (animation), Dave Cunningham (supervising)	Written by : Kyle McCulloch and Kaz; Storyboarded by : Shellie O'Brien	May 6, 2016	325–969	1.80
199	21	"Lame and Fortune"	Alan Smart and Tom Yasumi (animation), Sherm Cohen (supervising)	Written by : Mr. Lawrence; Storyboarded by : Chong Lee	July 11, 2016	325–968	1.96
"Sold!": A TV commercial misleads SpongeBob and Patrick into thinking that their houses have been sold. They move into the Krusty Krab and make a house out of trash, but when they want to visit their old houses, Squidward tells them that the houses have already been bought. He acts as both a German family in SpongeBob's house and a rock star in Patrick's house to maintain the lie, but it backfires when SpongeBob and Patrick literally flip his house. "Lame and Fortune": A crate of fortune cookies falls into SpongeBob's backyard. He shares them with Mr. Krabs, who finds that all the fortunes magically come true. To sabotage his business, Plankton begins writing insulting and negative fortunes, culminating in a death threat against Krabs unless he gives up the formula.
200	22	"Goodbye, Krabby Patty?"	Alan Smart and Tom Yasumi (animation), Sherm Cohen and Dave Cunningham (supervising)	Written by : Kyle McCulloch; Storyboarded by : Fred Osmond	February 20, 2017	325–972	2.67
200	22	"Goodbye, Krabby Patty?"	Alan Smart and Tom Yasumi (animation), Sherm Cohen and Dave Cunningham (supervising)	Written by : Kyle McCulloch; Storyboarded by : Fred Osmond	February 20, 2017	325–973	2.67
Mr. Krabs notes the convenience of frozen food and, with the help of ad executive Don Grouper, starts a popular line of microwavable Frozen Krabby Patties. SpongeBob is dismayed when the Krusty Krab is turned into a museum and gift shop, and he is not allowed to make fresh Krabby Patties anymore. Meanwhile, Patrick becomes rich and famous for acting in Frozen Krabby Patty advertisements, costing his friendship with SpongeBob.
201	23	"Sandy's Nutmare"	Alan Smart and Tom Yasumi (animation), Sherm Cohen (supervising)	Written by : Andrew Goodman; Storyboarded by : John Trabbic	July 12, 2016	325–966	2.00
201	23	"Bulletin Board"	Alan Smart and Tom Yasumi (animation), Dave Cunningham (supervising)	Written by : Jack Pendarvis; Storyboarded by : Ed Baker	October 1, 2016	325–958	2.11
"Sandy's Nutmare": Following a surplus of acorns from an experimental fertilizer, Sandy produces a nut-based food product called Nutty Butter, which becomes popular around town. However, when her tree's health starts to suffer, Sandy is unsure whether to keep producing Nutty Butter or save her tree. "Bulletin Board": A community bulletin board is posted inside the Krusty Krab. While it attracts positive comments at first, an anonymous user begins bullying and insulting people. SpongeBob, Squidward, and Mr. Krabs hold a stakeout to find out who it is.
202	24	"Food Con Castaways"	Alan Smart (animation), Sherm Cohen (supervising)	Written by : Daniel Dominguez and Josh Androsky; Storyboarded by : Chris Allison and Ryan Kramer	July 13, 2016	325–967	2.02
202	24	"Snail Mail"	Tom Yasumi (animation), Dave Cunningham (supervising)	Written by : Clare O'Kane; Storyboarded by : Chong Lee	October 22, 2016	325–970	1.67
"Food Con Castaways": SpongeBob, Mr. Krabs, Squidward, and Patrick head to Food Con, where Mr. Krabs plans to present the Krabby Patty and win an award. Patrick eats all the Krabby Patties on the way, leaving only one, which the group must protect while they are stranded in the forest. "Snail Mail": Gary's slime deforms a letter on SpongeBob's note to his pen pal, from "frying" to "flying." SpongeBob does not want to disappoint his pen pal and admit the mistake, so Sandy teaches him how to be a pilot in time for the Bikini Bottom Air Show.
203	25	"Pineapple Invasion"	Alan Smart (animation), Sherm Cohen (supervising)	Written by : Kaz; Storyboarded by : Fred Osmond	July 14, 2016	325–954	2.24
203	25	"Salsa Imbecilicus"	Tom Yasumi (animation), Dave Cunningham (supervising)	Written by : Kaz; Storyboarded by : Brian Morante	July 15, 2016	325–971	1.83
"Pineapple Invasion": Mr. Krabs has SpongeBob keep the secret formula safe in his house. While SpongeBob is away, Gary is left to defend the house from Plankton. "Salsa Imbecilicus": Plankton creates a sauce that lowers the intelligence of whoever eats it. The fumes are sucked into an air vent, absorbed by a cloud, and rain on Bikini Bottom, turning everyone as stupid as Patrick. Sandy and Karen are the only ones not affected, and must re-educate the town.
204	26	"Mutiny on the Krusty"	Tom Yasumi (animation), Sherm Cohem (supervising)	Written by : Kaz; Storyboarded by : Fred Osmond	October 8, 2016	325–962	1.94
204	26	"The Whole Tooth"	Alan Smart (animation), Dave Cunningham (supervising)	Written by : Kyle McCulloch; Storyboarded by : John Trabbic	December 3, 2016	325–965	2.12
"Mutiny on the Krusty": The Krusty Krab is caught in a rip current, trapping everyone inside. Annoyed by Mr. Krabs's greedy and rude nature, the customers seek new leadership. "The Whole Tooth": Patrick has a toothache, and a visit to the dentist reveals that he needs his last baby tooth removed. Although he is frightened, Patrick is able to go through with his dental appointment with encouragement from SpongeBob.

== DVD release ==
The DVD boxset for season nine was released by Paramount Home Entertainment and Nickelodeon in the United States and Canada on October 10, 2017, eight months after the season had completed broadcast on television. The DVD release features bonus materials, including "animated shorts".

SpongeBob SquarePants: The Complete Ninth Season
Set details			Special features
26 episodes; 4-disc set; 1.78:1 aspect ratio; Languages: English (Dolby Digital 5.1); Spanish (Dolby Stereo); French (Dolby Stereo)			"Goodbye, Krabby Patty?" shorts: "Frozen Krabby Patty"; "More Feeling"; "What Else Can a Krabby Patty Do?"; "Krabby Patty Report"; "Krabby Patty Jingle"
Release dates			"Goodbye, Krabby Patty?" shorts: "Frozen Krabby Patty"; "More Feeling"; "What Else Can a Krabby Patty Do?"; "Krabby Patty Report"; "Krabby Patty Jingle"
Region 1	Region 2	Region 4	"Goodbye, Krabby Patty?" shorts: "Frozen Krabby Patty"; "More Feeling"; "What Else Can a Krabby Patty Do?"; "Krabby Patty Report"; "Krabby Patty Jingle"
October 10, 2017	TBA	October 7, 2020	"Goodbye, Krabby Patty?" shorts: "Frozen Krabby Patty"; "More Feeling"; "What Else Can a Krabby Patty Do?"; "Krabby Patty Report"; "Krabby Patty Jingle"
