= Voice casting =

Voice casting is an important pre-production process for selecting the voice talent for radio and television commercials, documentary and corporate narrations, audiobooks and online tutorials.

== Online voice casting ==
There has been a shift to online voice over casting in recent years. With many professional voice talent utilizing home studios, clients are able to cut out traditional bricks and mortar agents. Websites devoted exclusively to pre-screened professional voice over talent are servicing international clients often faster and cheaper than the traditional casting process of voice talent physically being required to be in a studio.
