= List of SpongeBob SquarePants home video releases =

This is a list of SpongeBob SquarePants home media releases, all distributed by Paramount Home Entertainment. This page does not include releases on Video CD, obscure format releases on such platforms as Game Boy Advance Video, obscure releases that were available in specific countries such South Africa, South Korea, or Greece, or other obscure releases that contained one or two episodes.

== Season boxsets ==
Season	Episodes	Years active	Release dates (Region 1)			Release dates (Region 2)	Release dates (Region 4)
Season	Episodes	Years active	Separate box set(s)		"100 Episodes" re-release	Release dates (Region 2)	Release dates (Region 4)
1	20	1999–2001	October 28, 2003; November 13, 2012		September 22, 2009; May 23, 2017; May 5, 2020 October 15, 2024	November 7, 2005	November 30, 2006
2	20	2000–03	October 19, 2004; November 13, 2012		September 22, 2009; May 23, 2017; May 5, 2020 October 15, 2024	October 23, 2006	November 30, 2006
3	20	2001–04	September 27, 2005; November 13, 2012		September 22, 2009; May 23, 2017; May 5, 2020 October 15, 2024	December 3, 2007	November 8, 2007
4	20	2005–07	September 12, 2006; November 13, 2012	January 9, 2007; November 13, 2012	September 22, 2009; May 23, 2017; May 5, 2020 October 15, 2024	November 3, 2008	November 7, 2008
5	20	2007–09	September 4, 2007; November 13, 2012	November 18, 2008; November 13, 2012	September 22, 2009; May 23, 2017; May 5, 2020 October 15, 2024	November 16, 2009	December 3, 2009
6	26	2008–10	December 8, 2009; November 13, 2012	December 7, 2010; November 13, 2012	June 4, 2019 October 15, 2024	November 29, 2010	December 2, 2010
7	26	2009–11	December 6, 2011		June 4, 2019 October 15, 2024	September 17, 2012	September 12, 2012
8	26	2011–12	March 12, 2013		June 4, 2019 October 15, 2024	October 28, 2013	October 30, 2013
9	26	2012–17	October 10, 2017		June 4, 2019 October 15, 2024	TBA	October 7, 2020
10	11	2016–17	October 15, 2019		October 15, 2024	TBA	October 7, 2020
11	26	2017–18	March 31, 2020		October 15, 2024	TBA	October 7, 2020
12	26	2018–20	January 12, 2021		October 15, 2024	TBA	TBA
13	26	2020–23	December 5, 2023		October 15, 2024	TBA	TBA
14	13	2023–24	November 19, 2024		October 15, 2024	TBA	TBA
15	13	2024–25	November 11, 2025		—N/a	TBA	TBA
16	13	2025–26	November 3, 2026		—N/a	TBA	TBA
17	?	2026–	?		—N/a	TBA	TBA

The Complete 1st Season
Set details			Special features
20 episodes (40 segment episodes, excluding "Help Wanted"); 3-disc set; 1.33:1 aspect ratio; Languages: English (Dolby Digital 2.0)			Audio commentaries for "Plankton!" and "Karate Choppers"; Featurettes: The Origin of SpongeBob SquarePants; Recollections From the First Season Crew; Everybody's Talking: The Voices Behind SpongeBob SquarePants; Drawing the Goo Lagoon; SpongeBob's Life Strategies; The Bikini Bottom's Up Tour; In the Key of Seas: Krusty Krab Karaoke; Music videos; Violent Femmes Sing SpongeBob; SpongeBob Scaredy Pants Music Video; SpongeBob Dancin' Pants Music Video
Release dates			Audio commentaries for "Plankton!" and "Karate Choppers"; Featurettes: The Origin of SpongeBob SquarePants; Recollections From the First Season Crew; Everybody's Talking: The Voices Behind SpongeBob SquarePants; Drawing the Goo Lagoon; SpongeBob's Life Strategies; The Bikini Bottom's Up Tour; In the Key of Seas: Krusty Krab Karaoke; Music videos; Violent Femmes Sing SpongeBob; SpongeBob Scaredy Pants Music Video; SpongeBob Dancin' Pants Music Video
Region 1	Region 2	Region 4	Audio commentaries for "Plankton!" and "Karate Choppers"; Featurettes: The Origin of SpongeBob SquarePants; Recollections From the First Season Crew; Everybody's Talking: The Voices Behind SpongeBob SquarePants; Drawing the Goo Lagoon; SpongeBob's Life Strategies; The Bikini Bottom's Up Tour; In the Key of Seas: Krusty Krab Karaoke; Music videos; Violent Femmes Sing SpongeBob; SpongeBob Scaredy Pants Music Video; SpongeBob Dancin' Pants Music Video
October 28, 2003; November 13, 2012	November 7, 2005	November 30, 2006	Audio commentaries for "Plankton!" and "Karate Choppers"; Featurettes: The Origin of SpongeBob SquarePants; Recollections From the First Season Crew; Everybody's Talking: The Voices Behind SpongeBob SquarePants; Drawing the Goo Lagoon; SpongeBob's Life Strategies; The Bikini Bottom's Up Tour; In the Key of Seas: Krusty Krab Karaoke; Music videos; Violent Femmes Sing SpongeBob; SpongeBob Scaredy Pants Music Video; SpongeBob Dancin' Pants Music Video
Episodes
Disc 1: "Reef Blower", "Tea at the Treedome", "Bubblestand", "Ripped Pants", "Jellyfishing", "Plankton!", "Naughty Nautical Neighbors", "Boating School", "Pizza Delivery", "Home Sweet Pineapple", "Mermaid Man and Barnacle Boy", "Pickles", "Hall Monitor", "Jellyfish Jam", "Sandy's Rocket", and "Squeaky Boots"; Disc 2: "Nature Pants", "Opposite Day", "Culture Shock", "F.U.N.", "MuscleBob BuffPants", "Squidward the Unfriendly Ghost", "The Chaperone", "Employee of the Month", "Scaredy Pants", "I Was a Teenage Gary", "SB-129", "Karate Choppers", "Sleepy Time", "Suds", "Valentine's Day", and "The Paper"; Disc 3: "Arrgh!", "Rock Bottom", "Texas", "Walking Small", "Fools in April", "Neptune's Spatula", "Hooky", and "Mermaid Man and Barnacle Boy II"

The Complete 2nd Season
Set details			Special features
20 episodes (39 segment episodes); 3-disc set; 1.33:1 aspect ratio; Languages: English (Dolby Digital 2.0); Spanish (Dolby Digital 2.0)			Audio commentaries for: "Something Smells"; "Big Pink Loser"; "Prehibernation Week"; "Survival of the Idiots"; "Shanghaied"; "Welcome to the Chum Bucket"; "Sailor Mouth"; Storyboards for "Christmas Who?" and "Mermaid Man and Barnacle Boy III"; Around the World With SpongeBob SquarePants featurette; Nick DVD Game Demo; Tickets to The SpongeBob SquarePants Movie
Release dates			Audio commentaries for: "Something Smells"; "Big Pink Loser"; "Prehibernation Week"; "Survival of the Idiots"; "Shanghaied"; "Welcome to the Chum Bucket"; "Sailor Mouth"; Storyboards for "Christmas Who?" and "Mermaid Man and Barnacle Boy III"; Around the World With SpongeBob SquarePants featurette; Nick DVD Game Demo; Tickets to The SpongeBob SquarePants Movie
Region 1	Region 2	Region 4	Audio commentaries for: "Something Smells"; "Big Pink Loser"; "Prehibernation Week"; "Survival of the Idiots"; "Shanghaied"; "Welcome to the Chum Bucket"; "Sailor Mouth"; Storyboards for "Christmas Who?" and "Mermaid Man and Barnacle Boy III"; Around the World With SpongeBob SquarePants featurette; Nick DVD Game Demo; Tickets to The SpongeBob SquarePants Movie
October 19, 2004; November 13, 2012	October 23, 2006	November 30, 2006	Audio commentaries for: "Something Smells"; "Big Pink Loser"; "Prehibernation Week"; "Survival of the Idiots"; "Shanghaied"; "Welcome to the Chum Bucket"; "Sailor Mouth"; Storyboards for "Christmas Who?" and "Mermaid Man and Barnacle Boy III"; Around the World With SpongeBob SquarePants featurette; Nick DVD Game Demo; Tickets to The SpongeBob SquarePants Movie
Episodes
Disc 1: "Your Shoe's Untied", "Squid's Day Off", "Something Smells", "Bossy Boots", "Big Pink Loser", "Bubble Buddy", "Dying for Pie", "Imitation Krabs", "Wormy", "Patty Hype", "Grandma's Kisses", "Squidville", "Prehibernation Week", "Life of Crime", and "Christmas Who?"; Disc 2: "Survival of the Idiots", "Dumped", "No Free Rides", "I'm Your Biggest Fanatic", "Mermaid Man and Barnacle Boy III", "Squirrel Jokes", "Pressure", "The Smoking Peanut", "Shanghaied", "Gary Takes a Bath", "Welcome to the Chum Bucket", "Frankendoodle", "The Secret Box", and "Band Geeks"; Disc 3: "Graveyard Shift", "Krusty Love", "Procrastination", "I'm with Stupid", "Sailor Mouth", "Artist Unknown", "Jellyfish Hunter", "The Fry Cook Games", "Sandy, SpongeBob, and the Worm", and "Squid on Strike"

The Complete 3rd Season
Set details			Special features
20 episodes (37 segment episodes); 3-disc set; 1.33:1 aspect ratio; Languages: English (Dolby Digital 2.0); French (Dolby Digital 2.0); Spanish (Dolby Digital 2.0)			"Help Wanted" on Disc 3; Pop-Up Video Tracks for "My Pretty Seahorse", and "No Weenies Allowed" on Disc 1, and "Krusty Krab Training Video" on Disc 2; How-To-Draw SpongeBob And Friends featurette on Disc 3
Release dates			"Help Wanted" on Disc 3; Pop-Up Video Tracks for "My Pretty Seahorse", and "No Weenies Allowed" on Disc 1, and "Krusty Krab Training Video" on Disc 2; How-To-Draw SpongeBob And Friends featurette on Disc 3
Region 1	Region 2	Region 4	"Help Wanted" on Disc 3; Pop-Up Video Tracks for "My Pretty Seahorse", and "No Weenies Allowed" on Disc 1, and "Krusty Krab Training Video" on Disc 2; How-To-Draw SpongeBob And Friends featurette on Disc 3
September 27, 2005; November 13, 2012	December 3, 2007	November 8, 2007	"Help Wanted" on Disc 3; Pop-Up Video Tracks for "My Pretty Seahorse", and "No Weenies Allowed" on Disc 1, and "Krusty Krab Training Video" on Disc 2; How-To-Draw SpongeBob And Friends featurette on Disc 3
Episodes
Disc 1: "The Algae's Always Greener", "SpongeGuard on Duty", "Club SpongeBob", "My Pretty Seahorse", "Just One Bite", "The Bully", "Nasty Patty", "Idiot Box", "Mermaid Man and Barnacle Boy IV", "Doing Time", "Snowball Effect", "One Krabs Trash", "As Seen on TV", "Can You Spare a Dime?", "No Weenies Allowed", and "Squilliam Returns"; Disc 2: "Krab Borg", "Rock-a-Bye Bivalve", "Wet Painters", "Krusty Krab Training Video", "Party Pooper Pants", "Chocolate with Nuts", "Mermaid Man and Barnacle Boy V", "New Student Starfish", "Clams", "Ugh", "The Great Snail Race", "Mid-Life Crustacean", "Born Again Krabs", and "I Had an Accident"; Disc 3: "Krabby Land", "The Camping Episode", "Missing Identity", "Plankton's Army", "The Sponge Who Could Fly", "SpongeBob Meets the Strangler", and "Pranks a Lot"

The Complete 4th Season
Set details			Special features
20 episodes (38 segment episodes); 2-disc sets; 1.33:1 aspect ratio; Languages: English (Dolby Digital 2.0)			Animatics for "Fear of a Krabby Patty" and "Dunces and Dragons"; Behind the Scenes with SpongeBob SquarePants featurette; "Best Day Ever" shorts; Best Day Ever Karaoke music video; Behind the Scenes with Pick Boy and SpongeBob featurette
Release dates			Animatics for "Fear of a Krabby Patty" and "Dunces and Dragons"; Behind the Scenes with SpongeBob SquarePants featurette; "Best Day Ever" shorts; Best Day Ever Karaoke music video; Behind the Scenes with Pick Boy and SpongeBob featurette
Region 1	Region 2	Region 4	Animatics for "Fear of a Krabby Patty" and "Dunces and Dragons"; Behind the Scenes with SpongeBob SquarePants featurette; "Best Day Ever" shorts; Best Day Ever Karaoke music video; Behind the Scenes with Pick Boy and SpongeBob featurette
September 12, 2006; January 9, 2007; November 13, 2012	November 3, 2008	November 7, 2008	Animatics for "Fear of a Krabby Patty" and "Dunces and Dragons"; Behind the Scenes with SpongeBob SquarePants featurette; "Best Day Ever" shorts; Best Day Ever Karaoke music video; Behind the Scenes with Pick Boy and SpongeBob featurette
Episodes
Disc 1: "Fear of a Krabby Patty", "Shell of a Man", "The Lost Mattress", "Krabs vs. Plankton", "Have You Seen This Snail?", "Skill Crane", "Good Neighbors", "Selling Out", and "Funny Pants"; Disc 2: "Dunces and Dragons", "Mermaid Man and Barnacle Boy VI: The Motion Picture", "Enemy In-Law", "Patrick SmartPants", "SquidBob TentaclePants", "Krusty Towers", "Mrs. Puff, You're Fired", "Ghost Host", and "Wishing You Well"; Disc 3: "Chimps Ahoy", "Whale of a Birthday", "Karate Island", "All That Glitters", "New Leaf", "Once Bitten", "Bummer Vacation", "Wigstruck", "Squidtastic Voyage", and "That's No Lady"; Disc 4: "Hocus Pocus", "The Thing", "Driven to Tears", "Rule of Dumb", "Best Frenemies", "Born to Be Wild", "Squid Wood", "The Pink Purloiner", "Best Day Ever", and "The Gift of Gum"

The Complete 5th Season
Set details			Special features
20 episodes (41 segment episodes); 2-disc sets; 1.33:1 aspect ratio; Languages: English (Dolby Digital 2.0)			Bubble Burst Trivia for "Friend or Foe" and "The Krusty Sponge"; "Friend or Foe" shorts; Karaoke music videos: "Bubble Song"; "Good-Bye Atlantis"; "Dead Eye"; "Together"; "If I Could Talk to Money"
Release dates			Bubble Burst Trivia for "Friend or Foe" and "The Krusty Sponge"; "Friend or Foe" shorts; Karaoke music videos: "Bubble Song"; "Good-Bye Atlantis"; "Dead Eye"; "Together"; "If I Could Talk to Money"
Region 1	Region 2	Region 4	Bubble Burst Trivia for "Friend or Foe" and "The Krusty Sponge"; "Friend or Foe" shorts; Karaoke music videos: "Bubble Song"; "Good-Bye Atlantis"; "Dead Eye"; "Together"; "If I Could Talk to Money"
September 4, 2007; November 18, 2008; November 13, 2012	November 16, 2009	December 3, 2009	Bubble Burst Trivia for "Friend or Foe" and "The Krusty Sponge"; "Friend or Foe" shorts; Karaoke music videos: "Bubble Song"; "Good-Bye Atlantis"; "Dead Eye"; "Together"; "If I Could Talk to Money"
Episodes
Disc 1: "Friend or Foe", "The Original Fry Cook", "Night Light", "Rise and Shine", "Waiting", "Fungus Among Us", "Spy Buddies", "Boat Smarts", "Good Ol' Whatshisname", "New Digs", and "Krabs à La Mode"; Disc 2: "Roller Cowards", "Bucket Sweet Bucket", "Breath of Fresh Squidward", "To Love a Patty", "SpongeBob vs. the Patty Gadget", "Money Talks", "Slimy Dancing", "The Krusty Sponge", and "Sing a Song of Patrick"; Disc 3: "Atlantis SquarePantis", "Picture Day", "A Flea in Her Dome", "Mermaid Man vs. SpongeBob", "Le Big Switch", "The Donut of Shame", "BlackJack", "Blackened Sponge", "Pest of the West", "The Krusty Plate", and "Pat No Pay"; Disc 4: "The Inmates of Summer", "To Save a Squirrel", "20,000 Patties Under the Sea", "The Battle of Bikini Bottom", "What Ever Happened to SpongeBob?", "Goo Goo Gas", "The Two Faces of Squidward", "SpongeHenge", "Banned in Bikini Bottom", and "Stanley S. SquarePants"

The Complete 6th Season
Set details			Special features
26 episodes (47 segment episodes); 2-disc sets; 1.33:1 aspect ratio; Languages: English (Dolby Digital 2.0)			The SpongeBob History Song featurette; Animated shorts: "Separation Anxiety"; "Surfing Dreams"; "SpongeBoard"; "Balloons"; "Juiceman"; "Traffic"; "The Outfit"; Bollywood Bob music video; How To Make SpongeBob SquarePants featurette; "The Clash of Triton" shorts; "SpongeGod"; "Neptune's Origins"
Release dates			The SpongeBob History Song featurette; Animated shorts: "Separation Anxiety"; "Surfing Dreams"; "SpongeBoard"; "Balloons"; "Juiceman"; "Traffic"; "The Outfit"; Bollywood Bob music video; How To Make SpongeBob SquarePants featurette; "The Clash of Triton" shorts; "SpongeGod"; "Neptune's Origins"
Region 1	Region 2	Region 4	The SpongeBob History Song featurette; Animated shorts: "Separation Anxiety"; "Surfing Dreams"; "SpongeBoard"; "Balloons"; "Juiceman"; "Traffic"; "The Outfit"; Bollywood Bob music video; How To Make SpongeBob SquarePants featurette; "The Clash of Triton" shorts; "SpongeGod"; "Neptune's Origins"
December 8, 2009; December 7, 2010; November 13, 2012	November 29, 2010	December 2, 2010	The SpongeBob History Song featurette; Animated shorts: "Separation Anxiety"; "Surfing Dreams"; "SpongeBoard"; "Balloons"; "Juiceman"; "Traffic"; "The Outfit"; Bollywood Bob music video; How To Make SpongeBob SquarePants featurette; "The Clash of Triton" shorts; "SpongeGod"; "Neptune's Origins"
Episodes
Disc 1: "Spongicus", "Suction Cup Symphony", "House Fancy", "Krabby Road", "Penny Foolish", "Nautical Novice", "Not Normal", "Gone", "SpongeBob SquarePants vs. The Big One", "A Life in a Day", "Sun Bleached", "Giant Squidward", "No Nose Knows", and "Patty Caper"; Disc 2: "Plankton's Regular", "To SquarePants or Not to SquarePants", "Squid's Visit", "The Splinter", "Slide Whistle Stooges", "Boating Buddies", "The Krabby Kronicle", "The Slumber Party", "Grooming Gary", and "Truth or Square" (extended version); Disc 3: "Porous Pockets", "Choir Boys", "Krusty Krushers", "The Card", "Dear Vikings", "Ditchin'", "Pineapple Fever", "Chum Caverns", "Grandpappy the Pirate", "Cephalopod Lodge", "Shuffleboarding", and "Professor Squidward"; Disc 4: "Pet or Pests", "Komputer Overload", "Gullible Pants", "Overbooked", "No Hat for Pat", "Toy Store of Doom", "The Clash of Triton", "Sand Castles in the Sand", "Shell Shocked", "Chum Bucket Supreme", and "Single Cell Anniversary"

The Complete 7th Season
Set details			Special features
26 episodes (50 segment episodes); 4-disc set; 1.33:1 aspect ratio; Languages: English (Dolby Digital 2.0)			Animated shorts for: "Back to the Past"; "SpongeBob's Last Stand"; "Legends of Bikini Bottom"; "The Great Patty Caper"
Release dates			Animated shorts for: "Back to the Past"; "SpongeBob's Last Stand"; "Legends of Bikini Bottom"; "The Great Patty Caper"
Region 1	Region 2	Region 4	Animated shorts for: "Back to the Past"; "SpongeBob's Last Stand"; "Legends of Bikini Bottom"; "The Great Patty Caper"
December 6, 2011	September 17, 2012	September 9, 2012	Animated shorts for: "Back to the Past"; "SpongeBob's Last Stand"; "Legends of Bikini Bottom"; "The Great Patty Caper"
Episodes
Disc 1: "Tentacle-Vision", "I Heart Dancing", "Growth Spout", "Stuck in the Wringer", "Someone's in the Kitchen with Sandy", "The Inside Job", "Greasy Buffoons", "Model Sponge", "Keep Bikini Bottom Beautiful", "A Pal for Gary", "Yours, Mine, and Mine", "Kracked Krabs", "The Curse of Bikini Bottom", and "Squidward in Clarinetland"; Disc 2: "SpongeBob's Last Stand", "Back to the Past", "The Bad Guy Club for Villains", "A Day Without Tears", "Summer Job", "One Coarse Meal", "Gary in Love", "The Play's the Thing", "Rodeo Daze", "Gramma's Secret Recipe", and "The Cent of Money"; Disc 3: "The Monster Who Came to Bikini Bottom", "Welcome to the Bikini Bottom Triangle", "The Curse of the Hex", "The Main Drain", "Trenchbillies", "Sponge-Cano!", "The Great Patty Caper", "That Sinking Feeling", "Karate Star", "Buried in Time", "Enchanted Tiki Dreams", "The Abrasive Side", and "Earworm"; Disc 4: "Hide and Then What Happens?", "Shellback Shenanigans", "The Masterpiece", "Whelk Attack", "You Don't Know Sponge", "Tunnel of Glove", "Krusty Dogs", "The Wreck of the Mauna Loa", "New Fish in Town", "Love That Squid", "Big Sister Sam", and "Perfect Chemistry"

The Complete 8th Season
Set details			Special features
26 episodes (47 segment episodes); 4-disc set; 1.33:1 aspect ratio; Languages: English (Dolby Digital 2.0)			Sandy's Vacation in Ruins featurette
Release dates			Sandy's Vacation in Ruins featurette
Region 1	Region 2	Region 4	Sandy's Vacation in Ruins featurette
March 12, 2013	October 28, 2013	October 30, 2013	Sandy's Vacation in Ruins featurette
Episodes
Disc 1: "Accidents Will Happen", "The Other Patty", "Drive Thru", "The Hot Shot", "A Friendly Game", "Sentimental Sponge", "Frozen Face-Off", "Squidward's School for Grown-Ups", "Oral Report", "Sweet and Sour Squid", and "The Googly Artiste"; Disc 2: "A SquarePants Family Vacation", "Patrick's Staycation", "Walking the Plankton", "Mooncation", "Mr. Krabs Takes a Vacation", "Ghoul Fools", "Mermaid Man Begins", "Plankton's Good Eye", "Barnacle Face", "Pet Sitter Pat", "House Sittin' for Sandy", and "Smoothe Jazz at Bikini Bottom"; Disc 3: "Bubble Troubles", "The Way of the Sponge", "The Krabby Patty That Ate Bikini Bottom", "Bubble Buddy Returns", "Restraining SpongeBob", "Fiasco!", "Are You Happy Now?", "Planet of the Jellyfish", "Free Samples", "Home Sweet Rubble", "Karen 2.0", "InSPONGEiac", "Face Freeze!", and "Glove World R.I.P."; Disc 4: "Squiditis", "Demolition Doofus", "Treats!", "For Here or to Go", "It's a SpongeBob Christmas!", "Super Evil Aquatic Villain Team Up is Go!", "Chum Fricassee", "The Good Krabby Name", "Move It or Lose It", and "Hello Bikini Bottom!"

The Complete 9th Season
Set details			Special features
26 episodes (49 segment episodes); 4-disc set; 1.78:1 aspect ratio; Languages: English (Dolby Digital 5.1); Spanish (Dolby Stereo); French (Dolby Stereo)			"Goodbye, Krabby Patty?" shorts: "Frozen Krabby Patty"; "More Feeling"; "What Else Can a Krabby Patty Do?"; "Krabby Patty Report"; "Krabby Patty Jingle"
Release dates			"Goodbye, Krabby Patty?" shorts: "Frozen Krabby Patty"; "More Feeling"; "What Else Can a Krabby Patty Do?"; "Krabby Patty Report"; "Krabby Patty Jingle"
Region 1	Region 2	Region 4	"Goodbye, Krabby Patty?" shorts: "Frozen Krabby Patty"; "More Feeling"; "What Else Can a Krabby Patty Do?"; "Krabby Patty Report"; "Krabby Patty Jingle"
October 10, 2017	TBA	October 7, 2020	"Goodbye, Krabby Patty?" shorts: "Frozen Krabby Patty"; "More Feeling"; "What Else Can a Krabby Patty Do?"; "Krabby Patty Report"; "Krabby Patty Jingle"
Episodes
Disc 1: "Extreme Spots", "Squirrel Record", "Patrick-Man!", "Gary's New Toy", "License to Milkshake", "Squid Baby", "Little Yellow Book", "Bumper to Bumper", "Eek, an Urchin!", "Squid Defense", "Jailbreak!", "Evil Spatula", and "It Came from Goo Lagoon"; Disc 2: "Safe Deposit Krabs", "Plankton's Pet", "Don't Look Now", "Séance Shméance", "Kenny the Cat", "Yeti Krabs", "SpongeBob You're Fired", "Lost in Bikini Bottom", "Tutor Sauce", "Squid Plus One", "The Executive Treatment", "Company Picnic", and "Pull Up a Barrel"; Disc 3: "Sanctuary!", "What's Eating Patrick?", "Patrick! The Game", "The Sewers of Bikini Bottom", "SpongeBob LongPants", "Larry's Gym", "The Fish Bowl", "Married to Money", "Mall Girl Pearl", "Two Thumbs Down", "Sharks vs. Pods", "CopyBob DittoPants", "Sold!", and "Lame and Fortune"; Disc 4: "Goodbye, Krabby Patty?", "Sandy's Nutmare", "Bulletin Board", "Food Con Castaways", "Snail Mail", "Pineapple Invasion", "Salsa Imbecilicus", "Mutiny on the Krusty", and "The Whole Tooth"

The Complete 10th Season
Set details			Special features
11 episodes (22 segment episodes); 2-disc set; 1.78:1 aspect ratio; Languages: English (Dolby Digital 5.1); Spanish (Dolby Stereo); French (Dolby Stereo)			Animated short: "Clam Up!"
Release dates			Animated short: "Clam Up!"
Region 1	Region 2	Region 4	Animated short: "Clam Up!"
October 15, 2019	TBA	October 7, 2020	Animated short: "Clam Up!"
Episodes
Disc 1: "Whirly Brains", "Mermaid Pants", "Unreal Estate", "Code Yellow", "Mimic Madness", "House Worming", "Snooze You Lose", "Krusty Katering", "SpongeBob's Place", "Plankton Gets the Boot", "Life Insurance", "Burst Your Bubble", "Plankton Retires", and "Trident Trouble"; Disc 2: "The Incredible Shrinking Sponge", "Sportz?", "The Getaway", "Lost and Found", "Patrick's Coupon", "Out of the Picture", "Feral Friends", and "Don't Wake Patrick"

The Complete 11th Season
Set details			Special features
26 episodes (50 segment episodes); 3-disc set; 1.78:1 aspect ratio; Languages: English (Dolby Digital 5.1); Spanish (Dolby Stereo); French (Dolby Stereo)			Animated short: "Plankton's Color Nullifer"
Release dates			Animated short: "Plankton's Color Nullifer"
Region 1	Region 2	Region 4	Animated short: "Plankton's Color Nullifer"
March 31, 2020	TBA	October 7, 2020	Animated short: "Plankton's Color Nullifer"
Episodes
Disc 1: "Cave Dwelling Sponge", "The Clam Whisperer", "Spot Returns", "The Check-Up", "Spin the Bottle", "There's a Sponge in My Soup", "Man Ray Returns", "Larry the Floor Manager", "The Legend of Boo-Kini Bottom", "No Pictures Please", "Stuck on the Roof", "Krabby Patty Creature Feature", "Teacher's Pests", "Sanitation Insanity", "Bunny Hunt", "Squid Noir", and "Scavenger Pants"; Disc 2: "Cuddle E. Hugs", "Pat the Horse", "Chatterbox Gary", "Don't Feed the Clowns", "Drive Happy", "Old Man Patrick", "Fun-Sized Friends", "Grandmum's the Word", "Doodle Dimension", "Moving Bubble Bass", "High Sea Diving", "Bottle Burglars", "My Leg!", "Ink Lemonade", "Mustard O' Mine", "Shopping List", "Whale Watching", and "Krusty Kleaners"; Disc 3: "Patnocchio", "ChefBob", "Plankton Paranoia", "Library Cards", "Call the Cops", "Surf N' Turf", "Goons on the Moon", "Appointment TV", "Karen's Virus", "The Grill is Gone", "The Night Patty", "Bubbletown", "Girls' Night Out", "Squirrel Jelly", and "The String"

The Complete 12th Season
Set details			Special features
26 episodes (47 segment episodes, excluding "Kwarantined Krab"); 3-disc set; 1.78:1 aspect ratio; Languages: English (Dolby Digital 5.1); Spanish (Dolby Stereo); French (Dolby Stereo)			"SpongeBob Appreciation Day: Patchy's Beach Bash!"
Release dates			"SpongeBob Appreciation Day: Patchy's Beach Bash!"
Region 1	Region 2	Region 4	"SpongeBob Appreciation Day: Patchy's Beach Bash!"
January 12, 2021	TBA	TBA	"SpongeBob Appreciation Day: Patchy's Beach Bash!"
Episodes
Disc 1: "FarmerBob", "Gary & Spot", "The Nitwitting", "The Ballad of Filthy Muck", "The Krusty Slammer", "Pineapple RV", "Gary's Got Legs", "King Plankton", "Plankton's Old Chum", "Stormy Weather", "Swamp Mates", "One Trick Sponge", "The Krusty Bucket", "Squid's on a Bus", "Sandy's Nutty Nieces", "Insecurity Guards", "Broken Alarm", and "Karen's Baby"; Disc 2: "Shell Games", "Senior Discount", "Mind the Gap", "Dirty Bubble Returns", "Jolly Lodgers", "Biddy Sitting", "SpongeBob's Big Birthday Blowout", "SpongeBob in RandomLand", "SpongeBob's Bad Habit", "Handemonium", "Breakin'", "Boss for a Day", "The Goofy Newbie", "The Ghost of Plankton", and "My Two Krabses"; Disc 3: "Knock Knock, Who's There?", "Pat Hearts Squid", "Lighthouse Louie", "Hiccup Plague", "A Cabin in the Kelp", "The Hankering", "Who R Zoo?", "Plankton's Intern", "Patrick's Tantrum", "Bubble Bass's Tab", "Kooky Cooks", "Escape from Beneath Glove World", "Krusty Koncessionaires", and "Dream Hoppers"

The Complete 13th Season
Set details			Special features
26 episodes (52 segment episodes); 4-disc set; 1.78:1 aspect ratio; Languages: English (Dolby Digital 5.1); Spanish (Dolby Stereo, only up to "Mandatory Music"); French (Dolby Stereo, only up to "Mandatory Music")			"The Tidal Zone: A SpongeBob Universe Special"
Release dates			"The Tidal Zone: A SpongeBob Universe Special"
Region 1	Region 2	Region 4	"The Tidal Zone: A SpongeBob Universe Special"
December 5, 2023	TBA	TBA	"The Tidal Zone: A SpongeBob Universe Special"
Episodes
Disc 1: "A Place for Pets", "Lockdown for Love", "Under the Small Top", "Squidward's Sick Daze", "Goofy Scoopers", "Pat the Dog", "Something Narwhal This Way Comes", "C.H.U.M.S", "SpongeBob's Road to Christmas", "Potato Puff", "There Will Be Grease", "The Big Bad Bubble Bass", and "Sea-Man Sponge Haters Club"; Disc 2: "Food PBFFT! Truck", "Upturn Girls", "Say Awww!", "Patrick the Mailman", "Captain Pipsqueak", "Plane to Sea", "Squidferatu", "Slappy Daze", "Welcome to Binary Bottom", "You're Going to Pay... Phone", "A Skin Wrinkle in Time", "Abandon Twits", "Wallhalla", "Salty Sponge", and "Karen for Spot"; Disc 3: "Arbor Day Disarray", "Ain't That the Tooth", "Ma and Pa's Big Hurrah", "Yellow Pavement", "The Flower Plot", "SpongeBob on Parade", "Delivery to Monster Island", "Ride Patrick Ride", "Hot Crossed Nuts", "Sir Urchin and Snail Fail", "Friendiversary", "Mandatory Music", "Dopey Dick", and "Plankton and the Beanstalk"; Disc 4: "My Friend Patty", "FUN-Believable", "Spatula of the Heavens", "Gary's Playhouse", "Swimming Fools", "The Goobfather", "SquidBird", "Allergy Attack!", "Big Top Flop", and "Sandy, Help Us!"

The Complete 14th Season
Set details			Special features
13 episodes (21 segment episodes); 2-disc set; 1.78:1 aspect ratio; Languages: English (Dolby Digital 5.1); Spanish (Dolby Stereo)			
Release dates
Region 1	Region 2	Region 4	
November 19, 2024	TBA	TBA	
Episodes
Disc 1: "Single-Celled Defense", "Buff for Puff", "We Heart Hoops", "SpongeChovy", "BassWard", "Squidiot Box", "Blood is Thicker Than Grease", "Don't Make Me Laugh", "Momageddon", "Pet the Rock", "Tango Tangle", and "Necro-Nom-Nom-Nom-I-Con"; Disc 2: "PL-1413", "In the Mood to Feud", "Mooned!", "Hysterical History", "Kreepaway Kamp", "Snow Yellow", "The Dirty Bubble Bass", "Sheldon SquarePants", and "Sandy's Country Christmas"

The Complete 15th Season
Set details			Special features
13 episodes (26 segment episodes); 2-disc set; 1.78:1 aspect ratio; Languages: English (Dolby Digital 5.1); Spanish (Dolby Stereo)			
Release dates
Region 1	Region 2	Region 4	
November 11, 2025	TBA	TBA	
Episodes
Disc 1: "Sammy Suckerfish", "Big League Bob", "UpWard", "Unidentified Flailing Octopus", "Bad Luck Bob", "The Sandman Cometh", "Biscuit Ballyhoo", "Student Driver Survivor", "Wiener Takes All", "Stuck in an Elevator", "Squidness Protection", "Dome Alone", "Wary Gary", and "Pinned"; Disc 2: "Jeffy T's Prankwell Emporium", "A Taste of Plankton", "Smartificial Intelligence", "Firehouse Bob", "Pablum Plankton", "MuseBob ModelPants", "Delivery of Doom", "My Father the Boat", "Who's Afraid of Mr. Snippers?", "A Fish Called Sandy", "Making Waves", and "Captain Quasar: The Next Iteration"

The Complete 16th Season
Set details			Special features
13 episodes (22 segment episodes); 2-disc set; 1.78:1 aspect ratio; Languages: English (Dolby Digital 5.1); Spanish (Dolby Stereo); French (Dolby Stereo)			
Release dates
Region 1	Region 2	Region 4	
November 3, 2026	TBA	TBA	
Episodes
Disc 1: "Bizarro Bottom", "Squidward's Tough Break", "Curse of the WereDoodle", "Gorilla Suit Day", "Exchange Student Driver", "The Kreepy Krab", "SpongeBob and Patrick's Timeline Twist-Up", "Laundro-Madness", "Hog Huntin'", "SpongeBob TrashPants", and "Krusty Kafeteria"; Disc 2: "The Haunted Bucket", "Go Fetch!", "Heart of Garbage", "Near-Mint Plankton", "Pardon My Wand", "Stupor-stition", "Pigskin Pearl", "The Green Tentacle", "Happy Krabby Birthday", "Karate Pals", and "Karen's Klatch"

== Other boxsets ==
The First 100 Episodes
DVD details	Special features
100 episodes (196 segment episodes); 14 discs; 1.33:1 aspect ratio; Languages: English (Dolby Digital 5.1)	Audio commentaries for: "Spy Buddies"; "New Digs"; "Roller Cowards"; "Bucket Sweet Bucket"; "To Love a Patty"; "Money Talks"; "SpongeBob vs. the Patty Gadget"; "Goo Goo Gas"; "The Inmates of Summer"; "The Two Faces of Squidward"; "Banned in Bikini Bottom"; Square Roots: The Story of SpongeBob SquarePants; Featurettes: Life Lessons from Bikini Bottom; Help Wanted: The Seven Seas Edition; Kick-Wham-Pow-Bob music video
Release dates	Audio commentaries for: "Spy Buddies"; "New Digs"; "Roller Cowards"; "Bucket Sweet Bucket"; "To Love a Patty"; "Money Talks"; "SpongeBob vs. the Patty Gadget"; "Goo Goo Gas"; "The Inmates of Summer"; "The Two Faces of Squidward"; "Banned in Bikini Bottom"; Square Roots: The Story of SpongeBob SquarePants; Featurettes: Life Lessons from Bikini Bottom; Help Wanted: The Seven Seas Edition; Kick-Wham-Pow-Bob music video
Region 1	Audio commentaries for: "Spy Buddies"; "New Digs"; "Roller Cowards"; "Bucket Sweet Bucket"; "To Love a Patty"; "Money Talks"; "SpongeBob vs. the Patty Gadget"; "Goo Goo Gas"; "The Inmates of Summer"; "The Two Faces of Squidward"; "Banned in Bikini Bottom"; Square Roots: The Story of SpongeBob SquarePants; Featurettes: Life Lessons from Bikini Bottom; Help Wanted: The Seven Seas Edition; Kick-Wham-Pow-Bob music video
September 22, 2009; May 23, 2017; May 5, 2020	Audio commentaries for: "Spy Buddies"; "New Digs"; "Roller Cowards"; "Bucket Sweet Bucket"; "To Love a Patty"; "Money Talks"; "SpongeBob vs. the Patty Gadget"; "Goo Goo Gas"; "The Inmates of Summer"; "The Two Faces of Squidward"; "Banned in Bikini Bottom"; Square Roots: The Story of SpongeBob SquarePants; Featurettes: Life Lessons from Bikini Bottom; Help Wanted: The Seven Seas Edition; Kick-Wham-Pow-Bob music video
Episodes
Disc 1: "Help Wanted", "Reef Blower", "Tea at the Treedome", "Bubblestand", "Ripped Pants", "Jellyfishing", "Plankton!", "Naughty Nautical Neighbors", "Boating School", "Pizza Delivery", "Home Sweet Pineapple", "Mermaid Man and Barnacle Boy", "Pickles", "Hall Monitor", "Jellyfish Jam", "Sandy's Rocket", and "Squeaky Boots"; Disc 2: "Nature Pants", "Opposite Day", "Culture Shock", "F.U.N.", "MuscleBob BuffPants", "Squidward the Unfriendly Ghost", "The Chaperone", "Employee of the Month", "Scaredy Pants", "I Was a Teenage Gary", "SB-129", "Karate Choppers", "Sleepy Time", "Suds", "Valentine's Day", and "The Paper"; Disc 3: "Arrgh!", "Rock Bottom", "Texas", "Walking Small", "Fools in April", "Neptune's Spatula", "Hooky", "Mermaid Man and Barnacle Boy II", "Your Shoe's Untied", "Squid's Day Off", "Something Smells", "Bossy Boots", "Big Pink Loser", "Bubble Buddy", "Dying for Pie", and "Imitation Krabs"; Disc 4: "Wormy", "Patty Hype", "Grandma's Kisses", "Squidville", "Prehibernation Week", "Life of Crime", "Christmas Who?", "Survival of the Idiots", "Dumped", "No Free Rides", "I'm Your Biggest Fanatic", "Mermaid Man and Barnacle Boy III", "Squirrel Jokes", "Pressure", and "The Smoking Peanut"; Disc 5: "Shanghaied" (original 22-minute broadcast version), "Gary Takes a Bath", "Welcome to the Chum Bucket", "Frankendoodle", "The Secret Box", "Band Geeks", "Graveyard Shift", "Krusty Love", "Procrastination", "I'm with Stupid", "Sailor Mouth", "Artist Unknown", "Jellyfish Hunter", and "The Fry Cook Games"; Disc 6: "Sandy, SpongeBob, and the Worm", "Squid on Strike", "The Algae's Always Greener", "SpongeGuard on Duty", "Club SpongeBob", "My Pretty Seahorse", "The Bully", "Just One Bite", "Nasty Patty", "Idiot Box", "Mermaid Man and Barnacle Boy IV", "Doing Time", "Snowball Effect", "One Krabs Trash", "As Seen on TV", and "Can You Spare a Dime?"; Disc 7: "No Weenies Allowed", "Squilliam Returns", "Krab Borg", "Rock-a-Bye Bivalve", "Wet Painters", "Krusty Krab Training Video", "Party Pooper Pants", "Chocolate with Nuts", "Mermaid Man and Barnacle Boy V", "New Student Starfish", "Clams", "Ugh", "The Great Snail Race", and "Mid-Life Crustacean"; Disc 8: "Born Again Krabs", "I Had an Accident", "Krabby Land", "The Camping Episode", "Missing Identity", "Plankton's Army", "The Sponge Who Could Fly", "SpongeBob Meets the Strangler", "Pranks a Lot", "Fear of a Krabby Patty", "Shell of a Man", "The Lost Mattress", "Krabs vs. Plankton", and "Have You Seen This Snail?"; Disc 9: "Skill Crane", "Good Neighbors", "Selling Out", "Funny Pants", "Dunces and Dragons", "Enemy In-Law", "Mermaid Man and Barnacle Boy VI: The Motion Picture", "Patrick SmartPants", "SquidBob TentaclePants", "Krusty Towers", "Mrs. Puff, You're Fired", "Ghost Host", "Chimps Ahoy", "Whale of a Birthday", and "Karate Island"; Disc 10: "All That Glitters", "Wishing You Well", "New Leaf", "Once Bitten", "Bummer Vacation", "Wigstruck", "Squidtastic Voyage", "That's No Lady", "The Thing", "Hocus Pocus", "Driven to Tears", "Rule of Dumb", "Born to Be Wild", "Best Frenemies", "The Pink Purloiner", and "Squid Wood"; Disc 11: "Best Day Ever", "The Gift of Gum", "Friend or Foe", "The Original Fry Cook", "Night Light", "Rise and Shine", "Waiting", "Fungus Among Us", "Spy Buddies", "Boat Smarts", "Good Ol' Whatshisname", "New Digs", "Krabs à la Mode", "Roller Cowards", "Bucket Sweet Bucket", "To Love a Patty", and "Breath of Fresh Squidward"; Disc 12: "Money Talks", "SpongeBob vs. the Patty Gadget", "Slimy Dancing", "The Krusty Sponge", "Sing a Song of Patrick", "A Flea in Her Dome", "The Donut of Shame", "The Krusty Plate", "Goo Goo Gas", "Le Big Switch", "Atlantis SquarePantis", "Picture Day", "Pat No Pay", "BlackJack", "Blackened Sponge", and "Mermaid Man vs. SpongeBob"; Disc 13: "The Inmates of Summer", "To Save a Squirrel", "Pest of the West", "20,000 Patties Under the Sea", "The Battle of Bikini Bottom", "What Ever Happened to SpongeBob?", "The Two Faces of Squidward", "SpongeHenge", "Banned in Bikini Bottom", and "Stanley S. SquarePants"; Disc 14: Special features

The Next 100 Episodes
DVD details	Special features
104 episodes (193 segment episodes); 16 discs; 1.33:1 aspect ratio (seasons 6–8); 1.78:1 aspect ratio (season 9); Languages: English (Dolby Digital 5.1)	The SpongeBob History Song featurette; Animated shorts: "Separation Anxiety"; "Surfing Dreams"; "SpongeBoard"; "Balloons"; "Juiceman"; "Traffic"; "The Outfit"; Bollywood Bob music video; How To Make SpongeBob SquarePants featurette; "The Clash of Triton" shorts; "SpongeGod"; "Neptune's Origins"; Animated shorts for: "Back to the Past"; "SpongeBob's Last Stand"; "Legends of Bikini Bottom"; "The Great Patty Caper"; Sandy's Vacation in Ruins featurette; "Goodbye, Krabby Patty?" shorts: "Frozen Krabby Patty"; "More Feeling"; "What Else Can a Krabby Patty Do?"; "Krabby Patty Report"; "Krabby Patty Jingle"
Release dates
Region 1
June 4, 2019
Episodes
Disc 1: "Spongicus", "Suction Cup Symphony", "House Fancy", "Krabby Road", "Penny Foolish", "Nautical Novice", "Not Normal", "Gone", "SpongeBob SquarePants vs. The Big One", "A Life in a Day", "Sun Bleached", "Giant Squidward", "No Nose Knows", and "Patty Caper"; Disc 2: "Plankton's Regular", "To SquarePants or Not to SquarePants", "Squid's Visit", "The Splinter", "Slide Whistle Stooges", "Boating Buddies", "The Krabby Kronicle", "The Slumber Party", "Grooming Gary", and "Truth or Square" (extended version); Disc 3: "Porous Pockets", "Choir Boys", "Krusty Krushers", "The Card", "Dear Vikings", "Ditchin'", "Pineapple Fever", "Chum Caverns", "Grandpappy the Pirate", "Cephalopod Lodge", "Shuffleboarding", and "Professor Squidward"; Disc 4: "Pet or Pests", "Komputer Overload", "Gullible Pants", "Overbooked", "No Hat for Pat", "Toy Store of Doom", "The Clash of Triton", "Sand Castles in the Sand", "Shell Shocked", "Chum Bucket Supreme", and "Single Cell Anniversary"; Disc 5: "Tentacle-Vision", "I Heart Dancing", "Growth Spout", "Stuck in the Wringer", "Someone's in the Kitchen with Sandy", "The Inside Job", "Greasy Buffoons", "Model Sponge", "Keep Bikini Bottom Beautiful", "A Pal for Gary", "Yours, Mine, and Mine", "Kracked Krabs", "The Curse of Bikini Bottom", and "Squidward in Clarinetland"; Disc 6: "SpongeBob's Last Stand", "Back to the Past", "The Bad Guy Club for Villains", "A Day Without Tears", "Summer Job", "One Coarse Meal", "Gary in Love", "The Play's the Thing", "Rodeo Daze", "Gramma's Secret Recipe", and "The Cent of Money"; Disc 7: "The Monster Who Came to Bikini Bottom", "Welcome to the Bikini Bottom Triangle", "The Curse of the Hex", "The Main Drain", "Trenchbillies", "Sponge-Cano!", "The Great Patty Caper", "That Sinking Feeling", "Karate Star", "Buried in Time", "Enchanted Tiki Dreams", "The Abrasive Side", and "Earworm"; Disc 8: "Hide and Then What Happens?", "Shellback Shenanigans", "The Masterpiece", "Whelk Attack", "You Don't Know Sponge", "Tunnel of Glove", "Krusty Dogs", "The Wreck of the Mauna Loa", "New Fish in Town", "Love That Squid", "Big Sister Sam", and "Perfect Chemistry"; Disc 9: "Accidents Will Happen", "The Other Patty", "Drive Thru", "The Hot Shot", "A Friendly Game", "Sentimental Sponge", "Frozen Face-Off", "Squidward's School for Grown-Ups", "Oral Report", "Sweet and Sour Squid", and "The Googly Artiste"; Disc 10: "A SquarePants Family Vacation", "Patrick's Staycation", "Walking the Plankton", "Mooncation", "Mr. Krabs Takes a Vacation", "Ghoul Fools", "Mermaid Man Begins", "Plankton's Good Eye", "Barnacle Face", "Pet Sitter Pat", "House Sittin' for Sandy", and "Smoothe Jazz at Bikini Bottom"; Disc 11: "Bubble Troubles", "The Way of the Sponge", "The Krabby Patty That Ate Bikini Bottom", "Bubble Buddy Returns", "Restraining SpongeBob", "Fiasco!", "Are You Happy Now?", "Planet of the Jellyfish", "Free Samples", "Home Sweet Rubble", "Karen 2.0", "InSPONGEiac", "Face Freeze!", and "Glove World R.I.P."; Disc 12: "Squiditis", "Demolition Doofus", "Treats!", "For Here or to Go", "It's a SpongeBob Christmas!", "Super Evil Aquatic Villain Team Up is Go!", "Chum Fricassee", "The Good Krabby Name", "Move It or Lose It", and "Hello Bikini Bottom!"; Disc 13: "Extreme Spots", "Squirrel Record", "Patrick-Man!", "Gary's New Toy", "License to Milkshake", "Squid Baby", "Little Yellow Book", "Bumper to Bumper", "Eek, an Urchin!", "Squid Defense", "Jailbreak!", "Evil Spatula", and "It Came from Goo Lagoon"; Disc 14: "Safe Deposit Krabs", "Plankton's Pet", "Don't Look Now", "Séance Shméance", "Kenny the Cat", "Yeti Krabs", "SpongeBob You're Fired", "Lost in Bikini Bottom", "Tutor Sauce", "Squid Plus One", "The Executive Treatment", "Company Picnic", and "Pull Up a Barrel"; Disc 15: "Sanctuary!", "What's Eating Patrick?", "Patrick! The Game", "The Sewers of Bikini Bottom", "SpongeBob LongPants", "Larry's Gym", "The Fish Bowl", "Married to Money", "Mall Girl Pearl", "Two Thumbs Down", "Sharks vs. Pods", "CopyBob DittoPants", "Sold!", and "Lame and Fortune"; Disc 16: "Goodbye, Krabby Patty?", "Sandy's Nutmare", "Bulletin Board", "Food Con Castaways", "Snail Mail", "Pineapple Invasion", "Salsa Imbecilicus", "Mutiny on the Krusty", and "The Whole Tooth"

Another 100 Episodes
DVD details	Special features
102 episodes (192 segment episodes); 14 discs; 1.78:1 aspect ratio; Languages: English (Dolby Digital 5.1)	Animated short: "Clam Up!"; Animated short: "Plankton's Color Nullifer"; "SpongeBob Appreciation Day: Patchy's Beach Bash!"; "The Tidal Zone: A SpongeBob Universe Special"
Release dates	Animated short: "Clam Up!"; Animated short: "Plankton's Color Nullifer"; "SpongeBob Appreciation Day: Patchy's Beach Bash!"; "The Tidal Zone: A SpongeBob Universe Special"
Region 1	Animated short: "Clam Up!"; Animated short: "Plankton's Color Nullifer"; "SpongeBob Appreciation Day: Patchy's Beach Bash!"; "The Tidal Zone: A SpongeBob Universe Special"
October 15, 2024	Animated short: "Clam Up!"; Animated short: "Plankton's Color Nullifer"; "SpongeBob Appreciation Day: Patchy's Beach Bash!"; "The Tidal Zone: A SpongeBob Universe Special"
Episodes
Disc 1: "Whirly Brains", "Mermaid Pants", "Unreal Estate", "Code Yellow", "Mimic Madness", "House Worming", "Snooze You Lose", "Krusty Katering", "SpongeBob's Place", "Plankton Gets the Boot", "Life Insurance", "Burst Your Bubble", "Plankton Retires", and "Trident Trouble"; Disc 2: "The Incredible Shrinking Sponge", "Sportz?", "The Getaway", "Lost and Found", "Patrick's Coupon", "Out of the Picture", "Feral Friends", and "Don't Wake Patrick"; Disc 3: "Cave Dwelling Sponge", "The Clam Whisperer", "Spot Returns", "The Check-Up", "Spin the Bottle", "There's a Sponge in My Soup", "Man Ray Returns", "Larry the Floor Manager", "The Legend of Boo-Kini Bottom", "No Pictures Please", "Stuck on the Roof", "Krabby Patty Creature Feature", "Teacher's Pests", "Sanitation Insanity", "Bunny Hunt", "Squid Noir", and "Scavenger Pants"; Disc 4: "Cuddle E. Hugs", "Pat the Horse", "Chatterbox Gary", "Don't Feed the Clowns", "Drive Happy", "Old Man Patrick", "Fun-Sized Friends", "Grandmum's the Word", "Doodle Dimension", "Moving Bubble Bass", "High Sea Diving", "Bottle Burglars", "My Leg!", "Ink Lemonade", "Mustard O' Mine", "Shopping List", "Whale Watching", and "Krusty Kleaners"; Disc 5: "Patnocchio", "ChefBob", "Plankton Paranoia", "Library Cards", "Call the Cops", "Surf N' Turf", "Goons on the Moon", "Appointment TV", "Karen's Virus", "The Grill is Gone", "The Night Patty", "Bubbletown", "Girls' Night Out", "Squirrel Jelly", and "The String"; Disc 6: "FarmerBob", "Gary & Spot", "The Nitwitting", "The Ballad of Filthy Muck", "The Krusty Slammer", "Pineapple RV", "Gary's Got Legs", "King Plankton", "Plankton's Old Chum", "Stormy Weather", "Swamp Mates", "One Trick Sponge", "The Krusty Bucket", "Squid's on a Bus", "Sandy's Nutty Nieces", "Insecurity Guards", "Broken Alarm", and "Karen's Baby"; Disc 7: "Shell Games", "Senior Discount", "Mind the Gap", "Dirty Bubble Returns", "Jolly Lodgers", "Biddy Sitting", "SpongeBob's Big Birthday Blowout", "SpongeBob in RandomLand", "SpongeBob's Bad Habit", "Handemonium", "Breakin'", "Boss for a Day", "The Goofy Newbie", "The Ghost of Plankton", and "My Two Krabses"; Disc 8: "Knock Knock, Who's There?", "Pat Hearts Squid", "Lighthouse Louie", "Hiccup Plague", "A Cabin in the Kelp", "The Hankering", "Who R Zoo?", "Plankton's Intern", "Patrick's Tantrum", "Bubble Bass's Tab", "Kooky Cooks", "Escape from Beneath Glove World", "Krusty Koncessionaires", and "Dream Hoppers"; Disc 9: "A Place for Pets", "Lockdown for Love", "Under the Small Top", "Squidward's Sick Daze", "Goofy Scoopers", "Pat the Dog", "Something Narwhal This Way Comes", "C.H.U.M.S", "SpongeBob's Road to Christmas", "Potato Puff", "There Will Be Grease", "The Big Bad Bubble Bass", and "Sea-Man Sponge Haters Club"; Disc 10: "Food PBFFT! Truck", "Upturn Girls", "Say Awww!", "Patrick the Mailman", "Captain Pipsqueak", "Plane to Sea", "Squidferatu", "Slappy Daze", "Welcome to Binary Bottom", "You're Going to Pay... Phone", "A Skin Wrinkle in Time", "Abandon Twits", "Wallhalla", "Salty Sponge", and "Karen for Spot"; Disc 11: "Arbor Day Disarray", "Ain't That the Tooth", "Ma and Pa's Big Hurrah", "Yellow Pavement", "The Flower Plot", "SpongeBob on Parade", "Delivery to Monster Island", "Ride Patrick Ride", "Hot Crossed Nuts", "Sir Urchin and Snail Fail", "Friendiversary", "Mandatory Music", "Dopey Dick", and "Plankton and the Beanstalk"; Disc 12: "My Friend Patty", "FUN-Believable", "Spatula of the Heavens", "Gary's Playhouse", "Swimming Fools", "The Goobfather", "SquidBird", "Allergy Attack!", "Big Top Flop", and "Sandy, Help Us!"; Disc 13: "Single-Celled Defense", "Buff for Puff", "We Heart Hoops", "SpongeChovy", "BassWard", "Squidiot Box", "Blood is Thicker Than Grease", "Don't Make Me Laugh", "Momageddon", "Pet the Rock", "Tango Tangle", and "Necro-Nom-Nom-Nom-I-Con"; Disc 14: "PL-1413", "In the Mood to Feud", "Mooned!", "Hysterical History", "Kreepaway Kamp", "Snow Yellow", "The Dirty Bubble Bass", "Sheldon SquarePants", and "Sandy's Country Christmas"

The Best 200 Episodes Ever
DVD details	Special features
204 episodes (389 segment episodes); 30 discs; 1.33:1 aspect ratio (seasons 1–8); 1.78:1 aspect ratio (season 9); Languages: English (Dolby Digital 5.1)	Audio commentaries for: "Spy Buddies"; "New Digs"; "Roller Cowards"; "Bucket Sweet Bucket"; "To Love a Patty"; "Money Talks"; "SpongeBob vs. the Patty Gadget"; "Goo Goo Gas"; "The Inmates of Summer"; "The Two Faces of Squidward"; "Banned in Bikini Bottom"; Square Roots: The Story of SpongeBob SquarePants; Featurettes: Life Lessons from Bikini Bottom; Help Wanted: The Seven Seas Edition; Kick-Wham-Pow-Bob music video; The SpongeBob History Song featurette; Animated shorts: "Separation Anxiety"; "Surfing Dreams"; "SpongeBoard"; "Balloons"; "Juiceman"; "Traffic"; "The Outfit"; Bollywood Bob music video; How To Make SpongeBob SquarePants featurette; "The Clash of Triton" shorts; "SpongeGod"; "Neptune's Origins"; Animated shorts for: "Back to the Past"; "SpongeBob's Last Stand"; "Legends of Bikini Bottom"; "The Great Patty Caper"; Sandy's Vacation in Ruins featurette; "Goodbye, Krabby Patty?" shorts: "Frozen Krabby Patty"; "More Feeling"; "What Else Can a Krabby Patty Do?"; "Krabby Patty Report"; "Krabby Patty Jingle"
Release dates
Region 1
July 15, 2019
Episodes
Disc 1: "Help Wanted", "Reef Blower", "Tea at the Treedome", "Bubblestand", "Ripped Pants", "Jellyfishing", "Plankton!", "Naughty Nautical Neighbors", "Boating School", "Pizza Delivery", "Home Sweet Pineapple", "Mermaid Man and Barnacle Boy", "Pickles", "Hall Monitor", "Jellyfish Jam", "Sandy's Rocket", and "Squeaky Boots"; Disc 2: "Nature Pants", "Opposite Day", "Culture Shock", "F.U.N.", "MuscleBob BuffPants", "Squidward the Unfriendly Ghost", "The Chaperone", "Employee of the Month", "Scaredy Pants", "I Was a Teenage Gary", "SB-129", "Karate Choppers", "Sleepy Time", "Suds", "Valentine's Day", and "The Paper"; Disc 3: "Arrgh!", "Rock Bottom", "Texas", "Walking Small", "Fools in April", "Neptune's Spatula", "Hooky", "Mermaid Man and Barnacle Boy II", "Your Shoe's Untied", "Squid's Day Off", "Something Smells", "Bossy Boots", "Big Pink Loser", "Bubble Buddy", "Dying for Pie", and "Imitation Krabs"; Disc 4: "Wormy", "Patty Hype", "Grandma's Kisses", "Squidville", "Prehibernation Week", "Life of Crime", "Christmas Who?", "Survival of the Idiots", "Dumped", "No Free Rides", "I'm Your Biggest Fanatic", "Mermaid Man and Barnacle Boy III", "Squirrel Jokes", "Pressure", and "The Smoking Peanut"; Disc 5: "Shanghaied" (original 22-minute broadcast version), "Gary Takes a Bath", "Welcome to the Chum Bucket", "Frankendoodle", "The Secret Box", "Band Geeks", "Graveyard Shift", "Krusty Love", "Procrastination", "I'm with Stupid", "Sailor Mouth", "Artist Unknown", "Jellyfish Hunter", and "The Fry Cook Games"; Disc 6: "Sandy, SpongeBob, and the Worm", "Squid on Strike", "The Algae's Always Greener", "SpongeGuard on Duty", "Club SpongeBob", "My Pretty Seahorse", "The Bully", "Just One Bite", "Nasty Patty", "Idiot Box", "Mermaid Man and Barnacle Boy IV", "Doing Time", "Snowball Effect", "One Krabs Trash", "As Seen on TV", and "Can You Spare a Dime?"; Disc 7: "No Weenies Allowed", "Squilliam Returns", "Krab Borg", "Rock-a-Bye Bivalve", "Wet Painters", "Krusty Krab Training Video", "Party Pooper Pants", "Chocolate with Nuts", "Mermaid Man and Barnacle Boy V", "New Student Starfish", "Clams", "Ugh", "The Great Snail Race", and "Mid-Life Crustacean"; Disc 8: "Born Again Krabs", "I Had an Accident", "Krabby Land", "The Camping Episode", "Missing Identity", "Plankton's Army", "The Sponge Who Could Fly", "SpongeBob Meets the Strangler", "Pranks a Lot", "Fear of a Krabby Patty", "Shell of a Man", "The Lost Mattress", "Krabs vs. Plankton", and "Have You Seen This Snail?"; Disc 9: "Skill Crane", "Good Neighbors", "Selling Out", "Funny Pants", "Dunces and Dragons", "Enemy In-Law", "Mermaid Man and Barnacle Boy VI: The Motion Picture", "Patrick SmartPants", "SquidBob TentaclePants", "Krusty Towers", "Mrs. Puff, You're Fired", "Ghost Host", "Chimps Ahoy", "Whale of a Birthday", and "Karate Island"; Disc 10: "All That Glitters", "Wishing You Well", "New Leaf", "Once Bitten", "Bummer Vacation", "Wigstruck", "Squidtastic Voyage", "That's No Lady", "The Thing", "Hocus Pocus", "Driven to Tears", "Rule of Dumb", "Born to Be Wild", "Best Frenemies", "The Pink Purloiner", and "Squid Wood"; Disc 11: "Best Day Ever", "The Gift of Gum", "Friend or Foe", "The Original Fry Cook", "Night Light", "Rise and Shine", "Waiting", "Fungus Among Us", "Spy Buddies", "Boat Smarts", "Good Ol' Whatshisname", "New Digs", "Krabs à la Mode", "Roller Cowards", "Bucket Sweet Bucket", "To Love a Patty", and "Breath of Fresh Squidward"; Disc 12: "Money Talks", "SpongeBob vs. the Patty Gadget", "Slimy Dancing", "The Krusty Sponge", "Sing a Song of Patrick", "A Flea in Her Dome", "The Donut of Shame", "The Krusty Plate", "Goo Goo Gas", "Le Big Switch", "Atlantis SquarePantis", "Picture Day", "Pat No Pay", "BlackJack", "Blackened Sponge", and "Mermaid Man vs. SpongeBob"; Disc 13: "The Inmates of Summer", "To Save a Squirrel", "Pest of the West", "20,000 Patties Under the Sea", "The Battle of Bikini Bottom", "What Ever Happened to SpongeBob?", "The Two Faces of Squidward", "SpongeHenge", "Banned in Bikini Bottom", and "Stanley S. SquarePants"; Disc 14: "Spongicus", "Suction Cup Symphony", "House Fancy", "Krabby Road", "Penny Foolish", "Nautical Novice", "Not Normal", "Gone", "SpongeBob SquarePants vs. The Big One", "A Life in a Day", "Sun Bleached", "Giant Squidward", "No Nose Knows", and "Patty Caper"; Disc 15: "Plankton's Regular", "To SquarePants or Not to SquarePants", "Squid's Visit", "The Splinter", "Slide Whistle Stooges", "Boating Buddies", "The Krabby Kronicle", "The Slumber Party", "Grooming Gary", and "Truth or Square" (extended version); Disc 16: "Porous Pockets", "Choir Boys", "Krusty Krushers", "The Card", "Dear Vikings", "Ditchin'", "Pineapple Fever", "Chum Caverns", "Grandpappy the Pirate", "Cephalopod Lodge", "Shuffleboarding", and "Professor Squidward"; Disc 17: "Pet or Pests", "Komputer Overload", "Gullible Pants", "Overbooked", "No Hat for Pat", "Toy Store of Doom", "The Clash of Triton", "Sand Castles in the Sand", "Shell Shocked", "Chum Bucket Supreme", and "Single Cell Anniversary"; Disc 18: "Tentacle-Vision", "I Heart Dancing", "Growth Spout", "Stuck in the Wringer", "Someone's in the Kitchen with Sandy", "The Inside Job", "Greasy Buffoons", "Model Sponge", "Keep Bikini Bottom Beautiful", "A Pal for Gary", "Yours, Mine, and Mine", "Kracked Krabs", "The Curse of Bikini Bottom", and "Squidward in Clarinetland"; Disc 19: "SpongeBob's Last Stand", "Back to the Past", "The Bad Guy Club for Villains", "A Day Without Tears", "Summer Job", "One Coarse Meal", "Gary in Love", "The Play's the Thing", "Rodeo Daze", "Gramma's Secret Recipe", and "The Cent of Money"; Disc 20: "The Monster Who Came to Bikini Bottom", "Welcome to the Bikini Bottom Triangle", "The Curse of the Hex", "The Main Drain", "Trenchbillies", "Sponge-Cano!", "The Great Patty Caper", "That Sinking Feeling", "Karate Star", "Buried in Time", "Enchanted Tiki Dreams", "The Abrasive Side", and "Earworm"; Disc 21: "Hide and Then What Happens?", "Shellback Shenanigans", "The Masterpiece", "Whelk Attack", "You Don't Know Sponge", "Tunnel of Glove", "Krusty Dogs", "The Wreck of the Mauna Loa", "New Fish in Town", "Love That Squid", "Big Sister Sam", and "Perfect Chemistry"; Disc 22: "Accidents Will Happen", "The Other Patty", "Drive Thru", "The Hot Shot", "A Friendly Game", "Sentimental Sponge", "Frozen Face-Off", "Squidward's School for Grown-Ups", "Oral Report", "Sweet and Sour Squid", and "The Googly Artiste"; Disc 23: "A SquarePants Family Vacation", "Patrick's Staycation", "Walking the Plankton", "Mooncation", "Mr. Krabs Takes a Vacation", "Ghoul Fools", "Mermaid Man Begins", "Plankton's Good Eye", "Barnacle Face", "Pet Sitter Pat", "House Sittin' for Sandy", and "Smoothe Jazz at Bikini Bottom"; Disc 24: "Bubble Troubles", "The Way of the Sponge", "The Krabby Patty That Ate Bikini Bottom", "Bubble Buddy Returns", "Restraining SpongeBob", "Fiasco!", "Are You Happy Now?", "Planet of the Jellyfish", "Free Samples", "Home Sweet Rubble", "Karen 2.0", "InSPONGEiac", "Face Freeze!", and "Glove World R.I.P."; Disc 25: "Squiditis", "Demolition Doofus", "Treats!", "For Here or to Go", "It's a SpongeBob Christmas!", "Super Evil Aquatic Villain Team Up is Go!", "Chum Fricassee", "The Good Krabby Name", "Move It or Lose It", and "Hello Bikini Bottom!"; Disc 26: "Extreme Spots", "Squirrel Record", "Patrick-Man!", "Gary's New Toy", "License to Milkshake", "Squid Baby", "Little Yellow Book", "Bumper to Bumper", "Eek, an Urchin!", "Squid Defense", "Jailbreak!", "Evil Spatula", and "It Came from Goo Lagoon"; Disc 27: "Safe Deposit Krabs", "Plankton's Pet", "Don't Look Now", "Séance Shméance", "Kenny the Cat", "Yeti Krabs", "SpongeBob You're Fired", "Lost in Bikini Bottom", "Tutor Sauce", "Squid Plus One", "The Executive Treatment", "Company Picnic", and "Pull Up a Barrel"; Disc 28: "Sanctuary!", "What's Eating Patrick?", "Patrick! The Game", "The Sewers of Bikini Bottom", "SpongeBob LongPants", "Larry's Gym", "The Fish Bowl", "Married to Money", "Mall Girl Pearl", "Two Thumbs Down", "Sharks vs. Pods", "CopyBob DittoPants", "Sold!", and "Lame and Fortune"; Disc 29: "Goodbye, Krabby Patty?", "Sandy's Nutmare", "Bulletin Board", "Food Con Castaways", "Snail Mail", "Pineapple Invasion", "Salsa Imbecilicus", "Mutiny on the Krusty", and "The Whole Tooth"; Disc 30: Special features

The Best 300 Episodes Ever
DVD details	Special features
306 episodes (581 segment episodes); 44 discs; 1.33:1 aspect ratio (seasons 1–8); 1.78:1 aspect ratio (seasons 9–14); Languages: English (Dolby Digital 5.1)	Audio commentaries for: "Spy Buddies"; "New Digs"; "Roller Cowards"; "Bucket Sweet Bucket"; "To Love a Patty"; "Money Talks"; "SpongeBob vs. the Patty Gadget"; "Goo Goo Gas"; "The Inmates of Summer"; "The Two Faces of Squidward"; "Banned in Bikini Bottom"; Square Roots: The Story of SpongeBob SquarePants; Featurettes: Life Lessons from Bikini Bottom; Help Wanted: The Seven Seas Edition; Kick-Wham-Pow-Bob music video; The SpongeBob History Song featurette; Animated shorts: "Separation Anxiety"; "Surfing Dreams"; "SpongeBoard"; "Balloons"; "Juiceman"; "Traffic"; "The Outfit"; Bollywood Bob music video; How To Make SpongeBob SquarePants featurette; "The Clash of Triton" shorts; "SpongeGod"; "Neptune's Origins"; Animated shorts for: "Back to the Past"; "SpongeBob's Last Stand"; "Legends of Bikini Bottom"; "The Great Patty Caper"; Sandy's Vacation in Ruins featurette; "Goodbye, Krabby Patty?" shorts: "Frozen Krabby Patty"; "More Feeling"; "What Else Can a Krabby Patty Do?"; "Krabby Patty Report"; "Krabby Patty Jingle"; Animated short: "Clam Up!"; Animated short: "Plankton's Color Nullifer"; "SpongeBob Appreciation Day: Patchy's Beach Bash!"; "The Tidal Zone: A SpongeBob Universe Special"
Release dates
Region 1
October 15, 2024
Episodes
Disc 1: "Help Wanted", "Reef Blower", "Tea at the Treedome", "Bubblestand", "Ripped Pants", "Jellyfishing", "Plankton!", "Naughty Nautical Neighbors", "Boating School", "Pizza Delivery", "Home Sweet Pineapple", "Mermaid Man and Barnacle Boy", "Pickles", "Hall Monitor", "Jellyfish Jam", "Sandy's Rocket", and "Squeaky Boots"; Disc 2: "Nature Pants", "Opposite Day", "Culture Shock", "F.U.N.", "MuscleBob BuffPants", "Squidward the Unfriendly Ghost", "The Chaperone", "Employee of the Month", "Scaredy Pants", "I Was a Teenage Gary", "SB-129", "Karate Choppers", "Sleepy Time", "Suds", "Valentine's Day", and "The Paper"; Disc 3: "Arrgh!", "Rock Bottom", "Texas", "Walking Small", "Fools in April", "Neptune's Spatula", "Hooky", "Mermaid Man and Barnacle Boy II", "Your Shoe's Untied", "Squid's Day Off", "Something Smells", "Bossy Boots", "Big Pink Loser", "Bubble Buddy", "Dying for Pie", and "Imitation Krabs"; Disc 4: "Wormy", "Patty Hype", "Grandma's Kisses", "Squidville", "Prehibernation Week", "Life of Crime", "Christmas Who?", "Survival of the Idiots", "Dumped", "No Free Rides", "I'm Your Biggest Fanatic", "Mermaid Man and Barnacle Boy III", "Squirrel Jokes", "Pressure", and "The Smoking Peanut"; Disc 5: "Shanghaied" (original 22-minute broadcast version), "Gary Takes a Bath", "Welcome to the Chum Bucket", "Frankendoodle", "The Secret Box", "Band Geeks", "Graveyard Shift", "Krusty Love", "Procrastination", "I'm with Stupid", "Sailor Mouth", "Artist Unknown", "Jellyfish Hunter", and "The Fry Cook Games"; Disc 6: "Sandy, SpongeBob, and the Worm", "Squid on Strike", "The Algae's Always Greener", "SpongeGuard on Duty", "Club SpongeBob", "My Pretty Seahorse", "The Bully", "Just One Bite", "Nasty Patty", "Idiot Box", "Mermaid Man and Barnacle Boy IV", "Doing Time", "Snowball Effect", "One Krabs Trash", "As Seen on TV", and "Can You Spare a Dime?"; Disc 7: "No Weenies Allowed", "Squilliam Returns", "Krab Borg", "Rock-a-Bye Bivalve", "Wet Painters", "Krusty Krab Training Video", "Party Pooper Pants", "Chocolate with Nuts", "Mermaid Man and Barnacle Boy V", "New Student Starfish", "Clams", "Ugh", "The Great Snail Race", and "Mid-Life Crustacean"; Disc 8: "Born Again Krabs", "I Had an Accident", "Krabby Land", "The Camping Episode", "Missing Identity", "Plankton's Army", "The Sponge Who Could Fly", "SpongeBob Meets the Strangler", "Pranks a Lot", "Fear of a Krabby Patty", "Shell of a Man", "The Lost Mattress", "Krabs vs. Plankton", and "Have You Seen This Snail?"; Disc 9: "Skill Crane", "Good Neighbors", "Selling Out", "Funny Pants", "Dunces and Dragons", "Enemy In-Law", "Mermaid Man and Barnacle Boy VI: The Motion Picture", "Patrick SmartPants", "SquidBob TentaclePants", "Krusty Towers", "Mrs. Puff, You're Fired", "Ghost Host", "Chimps Ahoy", "Whale of a Birthday", and "Karate Island"; Disc 10: "All That Glitters", "Wishing You Well", "New Leaf", "Once Bitten", "Bummer Vacation", "Wigstruck", "Squidtastic Voyage", "That's No Lady", "The Thing", "Hocus Pocus", "Driven to Tears", "Rule of Dumb", "Born to Be Wild", "Best Frenemies", "The Pink Purloiner", and "Squid Wood"; Disc 11: "Best Day Ever", "The Gift of Gum", "Friend or Foe", "The Original Fry Cook", "Night Light", "Rise and Shine", "Waiting", "Fungus Among Us", "Spy Buddies", "Boat Smarts", "Good Ol' Whatshisname", "New Digs", "Krabs à la Mode", "Roller Cowards", "Bucket Sweet Bucket", "To Love a Patty", and "Breath of Fresh Squidward"; Disc 12: "Money Talks", "SpongeBob vs. the Patty Gadget", "Slimy Dancing", "The Krusty Sponge", "Sing a Song of Patrick", "A Flea in Her Dome", "The Donut of Shame", "The Krusty Plate", "Goo Goo Gas", "Le Big Switch", "Atlantis SquarePantis", "Picture Day", "Pat No Pay", "BlackJack", "Blackened Sponge", and "Mermaid Man vs. SpongeBob"; Disc 13: "The Inmates of Summer", "To Save a Squirrel", "Pest of the West", "20,000 Patties Under the Sea", "The Battle of Bikini Bottom", "What Ever Happened to SpongeBob?", "The Two Faces of Squidward", "SpongeHenge", "Banned in Bikini Bottom", and "Stanley S. SquarePants"; Disc 14: "Spongicus", "Suction Cup Symphony", "House Fancy", "Krabby Road", "Penny Foolish", "Nautical Novice", "Not Normal", "Gone", "SpongeBob SquarePants vs. The Big One", "A Life in a Day", "Sun Bleached", "Giant Squidward", "No Nose Knows", and "Patty Caper"; Disc 15: "Plankton's Regular", "To SquarePants or Not to SquarePants", "Squid's Visit", "The Splinter", "Slide Whistle Stooges", "Boating Buddies", "The Krabby Kronicle", "The Slumber Party", "Grooming Gary", and "Truth or Square" (extended version); Disc 16: "Porous Pockets", "Choir Boys", "Krusty Krushers", "The Card", "Dear Vikings", "Ditchin'", "Pineapple Fever", "Chum Caverns", "Grandpappy the Pirate", "Cephalopod Lodge", "Shuffleboarding", and "Professor Squidward"; Disc 17: "Pet or Pests", "Komputer Overload", "Gullible Pants", "Overbooked", "No Hat for Pat", "Toy Store of Doom", "The Clash of Triton", "Sand Castles in the Sand", "Shell Shocked", "Chum Bucket Supreme", and "Single Cell Anniversary"; Disc 18: "Tentacle-Vision", "I Heart Dancing", "Growth Spout", "Stuck in the Wringer", "Someone's in the Kitchen with Sandy", "The Inside Job", "Greasy Buffoons", "Model Sponge", "Keep Bikini Bottom Beautiful", "A Pal for Gary", "Yours, Mine, and Mine", "Kracked Krabs", "The Curse of Bikini Bottom", and "Squidward in Clarinetland"; Disc 19: "SpongeBob's Last Stand", "Back to the Past", "The Bad Guy Club for Villains", "A Day Without Tears", "Summer Job", "One Coarse Meal", "Gary in Love", "The Play's the Thing", "Rodeo Daze", "Gramma's Secret Recipe", and "The Cent of Money"; Disc 20: "The Monster Who Came to Bikini Bottom", "Welcome to the Bikini Bottom Triangle", "The Curse of the Hex", "The Main Drain", "Trenchbillies", "Sponge-Cano!", "The Great Patty Caper", "That Sinking Feeling", "Karate Star", "Buried in Time", "Enchanted Tiki Dreams", "The Abrasive Side", and "Earworm"; Disc 21: "Hide and Then What Happens?", "Shellback Shenanigans", "The Masterpiece", "Whelk Attack", "You Don't Know Sponge", "Tunnel of Glove", "Krusty Dogs", "The Wreck of the Mauna Loa", "New Fish in Town", "Love That Squid", "Big Sister Sam", and "Perfect Chemistry"; Disc 22: "Accidents Will Happen", "The Other Patty", "Drive Thru", "The Hot Shot", "A Friendly Game", "Sentimental Sponge", "Frozen Face-Off", "Squidward's School for Grown-Ups", "Oral Report", "Sweet and Sour Squid", and "The Googly Artiste"; Disc 23: "A SquarePants Family Vacation", "Patrick's Staycation", "Walking the Plankton", "Mooncation", "Mr. Krabs Takes a Vacation", "Ghoul Fools", "Mermaid Man Begins", "Plankton's Good Eye", "Barnacle Face", "Pet Sitter Pat", "House Sittin' for Sandy", and "Smoothe Jazz at Bikini Bottom"; Disc 24: "Bubble Troubles", "The Way of the Sponge", "The Krabby Patty That Ate Bikini Bottom", "Bubble Buddy Returns", "Restraining SpongeBob", "Fiasco!", "Are You Happy Now?", "Planet of the Jellyfish", "Free Samples", "Home Sweet Rubble", "Karen 2.0", "InSPONGEiac", "Face Freeze!", and "Glove World R.I.P."; Disc 25: "Squiditis", "Demolition Doofus", "Treats!", "For Here or to Go", "It's a SpongeBob Christmas!", "Super Evil Aquatic Villain Team Up is Go!", "Chum Fricassee", "The Good Krabby Name", "Move It or Lose It", and "Hello Bikini Bottom!"; Disc 26: "Extreme Spots", "Squirrel Record", "Patrick-Man!", "Gary's New Toy", "License to Milkshake", "Squid Baby", "Little Yellow Book", "Bumper to Bumper", "Eek, an Urchin!", "Squid Defense", "Jailbreak!", "Evil Spatula", and "It Came from Goo Lagoon"; Disc 27: "Safe Deposit Krabs", "Plankton's Pet", "Don't Look Now", "Séance Shméance", "Kenny the Cat", "Yeti Krabs", "SpongeBob You're Fired", "Lost in Bikini Bottom", "Tutor Sauce", "Squid Plus One", "The Executive Treatment", "Company Picnic", and "Pull Up a Barrel"; Disc 28: "Sanctuary!", "What's Eating Patrick?", "Patrick! The Game", "The Sewers of Bikini Bottom", "SpongeBob LongPants", "Larry's Gym", "The Fish Bowl", "Married to Money", "Mall Girl Pearl", "Two Thumbs Down", "Sharks vs. Pods", "CopyBob DittoPants", "Sold!", and "Lame and Fortune"; Disc 29: "Goodbye, Krabby Patty?", "Sandy's Nutmare", "Bulletin Board", "Food Con Castaways", "Snail Mail", "Pineapple Invasion", "Salsa Imbecilicus", "Mutiny on the Krusty", and "The Whole Tooth"; Disc 30: "Whirly Brains", "Mermaid Pants", "Unreal Estate", "Code Yellow", "Mimic Madness", "House Worming", "Snooze You Lose", "Krusty Katering", "SpongeBob's Place", "Plankton Gets the Boot", "Life Insurance", "Burst Your Bubble", "Plankton Retires", and "Trident Trouble"; Disc 31: "The Incredible Shrinking Sponge", "Sportz?", "The Getaway", "Lost and Found", "Patrick's Coupon", "Out of the Picture", "Feral Friends", and "Don't Wake Patrick"; Disc 32: "Cave Dwelling Sponge", "The Clam Whisperer", "Spot Returns", "The Check-Up", "Spin the Bottle", "There's a Sponge in My Soup", "Man Ray Returns", "Larry the Floor Manager", "The Legend of Boo-Kini Bottom", "No Pictures Please", "Stuck on the Roof", "Krabby Patty Creature Feature", "Teacher's Pests", "Sanitation Insanity", "Bunny Hunt", "Squid Noir", and "Scavenger Pants"; Disc 33: "Cuddle E. Hugs", "Pat the Horse", "Chatterbox Gary", "Don't Feed the Clowns", "Drive Happy", "Old Man Patrick", "Fun-Sized Friends", "Grandmum's the Word", "Doodle Dimension", "Moving Bubble Bass", "High Sea Diving", "Bottle Burglars", "My Leg!", "Ink Lemonade", "Mustard O' Mine", "Shopping List", "Whale Watching", and "Krusty Kleaners"; Disc 34: "Patnocchio", "ChefBob", "Plankton Paranoia", "Library Cards", "Call the Cops", "Surf N' Turf", "Goons on the Moon", "Appointment TV", "Karen's Virus", "The Grill is Gone", "The Night Patty", "Bubbletown", "Girls' Night Out", "Squirrel Jelly", and "The String"; Disc 35: "FarmerBob", "Gary & Spot", "The Nitwitting", "The Ballad of Filthy Muck", "The Krusty Slammer", "Pineapple RV", "Gary's Got Legs", "King Plankton", "Plankton's Old Chum", "Stormy Weather", "Swamp Mates", "One Trick Sponge", "The Krusty Bucket", "Squid's on a Bus", "Sandy's Nutty Nieces", "Insecurity Guards", "Broken Alarm", and "Karen's Baby"; Disc 36: "Shell Games", "Senior Discount", "Mind the Gap", "Dirty Bubble Returns", "Jolly Lodgers", "Biddy Sitting", "SpongeBob's Big Birthday Blowout", "SpongeBob in RandomLand", "SpongeBob's Bad Habit", "Handemonium", "Breakin'", "Boss for a Day", "The Goofy Newbie", "The Ghost of Plankton", and "My Two Krabses"; Disc 37: "Knock Knock, Who's There?", "Pat Hearts Squid", "Lighthouse Louie", "Hiccup Plague", "A Cabin in the Kelp", "The Hankering", "Who R Zoo?", "Plankton's Intern", "Patrick's Tantrum", "Bubble Bass's Tab", "Kooky Cooks", "Escape from Beneath Glove World", "Krusty Koncessionaires", and "Dream Hoppers"; Disc 38: "A Place for Pets", "Lockdown for Love", "Under the Small Top", "Squidward's Sick Daze", "Goofy Scoopers", "Pat the Dog", "Something Narwhal This Way Comes", "C.H.U.M.S", "SpongeBob's Road to Christmas", "Potato Puff", "There Will Be Grease", "The Big Bad Bubble Bass", and "Sea-Man Sponge Haters Club"; Disc 39: "Food PBFFT! Truck", "Upturn Girls", "Say Awww!", "Patrick the Mailman", "Captain Pipsqueak", "Plane to Sea", "Squidferatu", "Slappy Daze", "Welcome to Binary Bottom", "You're Going to Pay... Phone", "A Skin Wrinkle in Time", "Abandon Twits", "Wallhalla", "Salty Sponge", and "Karen for Spot"; Disc 40: "Arbor Day Disarray", "Ain't That the Tooth", "Ma and Pa's Big Hurrah", "Yellow Pavement", "The Flower Plot", "SpongeBob on Parade", "Delivery to Monster Island", "Ride Patrick Ride", "Hot Crossed Nuts", "Sir Urchin and Snail Fail", "Friendiversary", "Mandatory Music", "Dopey Dick", and "Plankton and the Beanstalk"; Disc 41: "My Friend Patty", "FUN-Believable", "Spatula of the Heavens", "Gary's Playhouse", "Swimming Fools", "The Goobfather", "SquidBird", "Allergy Attack!", "Big Top Flop", and "Sandy, Help Us!"; Disc 42: "Single-Celled Defense", "Buff for Puff", "We Heart Hoops", "SpongeChovy", "BassWard", "Squidiot Box", "Blood is Thicker Than Grease", "Don't Make Me Laugh", "Momageddon", "Pet the Rock", "Tango Tangle", and "Necro-Nom-Nom-Nom-I-Con"; Disc 43: "PL-1413", "In the Mood to Feud", "Mooned!", "Hysterical History", "Kreepaway Kamp", "Snow Yellow", "The Dirty Bubble Bass", "Sheldon SquarePants", and "Sandy's Country Christmas"; Disc 44: Special features

== Themed DVD releases ==
Nautical Nonsense and Sponge Buddies
DVD details	Special features
10 segment episodes; 1.33:1 aspect ratio; Languages: English (Dolby Digital 2.0)	Featurettes: Backstage Pants; Drawing Characters; Show Design; The Graveyard Shift: In the Beginning; Violent Femmes Sing SpongeBob music video; Voice-Overs for "Texas", "Graveyard Shift", and "Dying for Pie"
Release dates	Featurettes: Backstage Pants; Drawing Characters; Show Design; The Graveyard Shift: In the Beginning; Violent Femmes Sing SpongeBob music video; Voice-Overs for "Texas", "Graveyard Shift", and "Dying for Pie"
Region 1	Featurettes: Backstage Pants; Drawing Characters; Show Design; The Graveyard Shift: In the Beginning; Violent Femmes Sing SpongeBob music video; Voice-Overs for "Texas", "Graveyard Shift", and "Dying for Pie"
March 12, 2002	Featurettes: Backstage Pants; Drawing Characters; Show Design; The Graveyard Shift: In the Beginning; Violent Femmes Sing SpongeBob music video; Voice-Overs for "Texas", "Graveyard Shift", and "Dying for Pie"
Episodes
"Ripped Pants", "SB-129", "Texas", "Graveyard Shift", "Something Smells", "Jellyfishing", "Dying for Pie", "Wormy", "F.U.N.", and "Club SpongeBob"

Halloween
DVD details	Special features
10 segment episodes; 1.33:1 aspect ratio; Languages: English (Dolby Digital 2.0)	SpongeBob ScaredyPants music video; SpongeBob SquarePants: Revenge of the Flying Dutchman sneak peek
Release dates	SpongeBob ScaredyPants music video; SpongeBob SquarePants: Revenge of the Flying Dutchman sneak peek
Region 1	SpongeBob ScaredyPants music video; SpongeBob SquarePants: Revenge of the Flying Dutchman sneak peek
August 27, 2002	SpongeBob ScaredyPants music video; SpongeBob SquarePants: Revenge of the Flying Dutchman sneak peek
Episodes
"Scaredy Pants", "Imitation Krabs", "Frankendoodle", "I Was a Teenage Gary", "Squidward the Unfriendly Ghost", "The Secret Box", "Band Geeks", "Welcome to the Chum Bucket", "My Pretty Seahorse", and "Idiot Box"

Sea Stories
DVD details	Special features
9 segment episodes (plus Shanghaied); 1.33:1 aspect ratio; Languages: English (Dolby Digital 2.0)	"Shanghaied" with three different endings; SpongeBob Dancin' Pants music video; SpongeBob SquarePants: Revenge of the Flying Dutchman hints and tips
Release dates	"Shanghaied" with three different endings; SpongeBob Dancin' Pants music video; SpongeBob SquarePants: Revenge of the Flying Dutchman hints and tips
Region 1	"Shanghaied" with three different endings; SpongeBob Dancin' Pants music video; SpongeBob SquarePants: Revenge of the Flying Dutchman hints and tips
November 5, 2002	"Shanghaied" with three different endings; SpongeBob Dancin' Pants music video; SpongeBob SquarePants: Revenge of the Flying Dutchman hints and tips
Episodes
"Gary Takes a Bath", "Hooky", "Life of Crime", "Pickles", "No Free Rides", "Sailor Mouth", "No Weenies Allowed", "Jellyfish Jam", and "The Algae's Always Greener"

Tales from the Deep
DVD details	Special features
9 segment episodes; 1.33:1 aspect ratio; Languages: English (Dolby Digital 2.0)	Storyboard for "Party Pooper Pants"; Drawing the Goo Lagoon featurette; Underwater Sun music video; Production Stills
Release dates	Storyboard for "Party Pooper Pants"; Drawing the Goo Lagoon featurette; Underwater Sun music video; Production Stills
Region 1	Storyboard for "Party Pooper Pants"; Drawing the Goo Lagoon featurette; Underwater Sun music video; Production Stills
January 28, 2003	Storyboard for "Party Pooper Pants"; Drawing the Goo Lagoon featurette; Underwater Sun music video; Production Stills
Episodes
"Party Pooper Pants", "Hall Monitor", "I Had an Accident", "Valentine's Day", "Just One Bite", "Mermaid Man and Barnacle Boy", "Tea at the Treedome", "The Paper", and "Born Again Krabs"

Lost at Sea
DVD details	Special features
9 segment episodes; 1.33:1 aspect ratio; Languages: English (Dolby Digital 2.0)	Audio commentary for "The Sponge Who Could Fly"; Storyboard for "The Sponge Who Could Fly"; Bikini Bottom's 7 Life Strategies featurette
Release dates	Audio commentary for "The Sponge Who Could Fly"; Storyboard for "The Sponge Who Could Fly"; Bikini Bottom's 7 Life Strategies featurette
Region 1	Audio commentary for "The Sponge Who Could Fly"; Storyboard for "The Sponge Who Could Fly"; Bikini Bottom's 7 Life Strategies featurette
March 4, 2003	Audio commentary for "The Sponge Who Could Fly"; Storyboard for "The Sponge Who Could Fly"; Bikini Bottom's 7 Life Strategies featurette
Episodes
"The Sponge Who Could Fly", "Plankton!", "Boating School", "Suds", "Mermaid Man and Barnacle Boy II", "The Chaperone", "Bubble Buddy", "Your Shoe's Untied", and "Prehibernation Week"

Tide and Seek
DVD details	Special features
10 segment episodes; 1.33:1 aspect ratio; Languages: English (Dolby Digital 2.0)	Audio commentaries for "Sleepy Time" and "Dumped"; Storyboard for "Mermaid Man and Barnacle Boy III"; Behind the Scenes: Special Delivery featurette; First themed DVD to have the Paramount DVD Logo with Menu Variant.
Release dates	Audio commentaries for "Sleepy Time" and "Dumped"; Storyboard for "Mermaid Man and Barnacle Boy III"; Behind the Scenes: Special Delivery featurette; First themed DVD to have the Paramount DVD Logo with Menu Variant.
Region 1	Audio commentaries for "Sleepy Time" and "Dumped"; Storyboard for "Mermaid Man and Barnacle Boy III"; Behind the Scenes: Special Delivery featurette; First themed DVD to have the Paramount DVD Logo with Menu Variant.
July 29, 2003	Audio commentaries for "Sleepy Time" and "Dumped"; Storyboard for "Mermaid Man and Barnacle Boy III"; Behind the Scenes: Special Delivery featurette; First themed DVD to have the Paramount DVD Logo with Menu Variant.
Episodes
"Mermaid Man and Barnacle Boy III", "Big Pink Loser", "Opposite Day", "Squirrel Jokes", "Rock-a-Bye Bivalve", "Dumped", "Bossy Boots", "The Bully", "Sleepy Time", and "Squidville"

Christmas
DVD details	Special features
9 segment episodes; 1.33:1 aspect ratio; Languages: English (Dolby Digital 2.0)	Audio commentary for "Christmas Who?"; Storyboard for "Christmas Who?"
Release dates	Audio commentary for "Christmas Who?"; Storyboard for "Christmas Who?"
Region 1	Audio commentary for "Christmas Who?"; Storyboard for "Christmas Who?"
September 30, 2003	Audio commentary for "Christmas Who?"; Storyboard for "Christmas Who?"
Episodes
"Christmas Who?", "Procrastination", "Snowball Effect", "Survival of the Idiots", "Mermaid Man and Barnacle Boy IV", "Chocolate with Nuts", "As Seen on TV", "Pizza Delivery", and "Squeaky Boots"

The Seascape Capers
DVD details	Special features
10 segment episodes; 1.33:1 aspect ratio; Languages: English (Dolby Digital 2.0)	Storyboard for "Grandma's Kisses"
Release dates	Storyboard for "Grandma's Kisses"
Region 1	Storyboard for "Grandma's Kisses"
January 6, 2004; September 25, 2012 (re-release)	Storyboard for "Grandma's Kisses"
Episodes
"The Fry Cook Games", "Bubblestand", "Squid's Day Off", "SpongeBob Meets the Strangler", "Pranks a Lot", "Artist Unknown", "Grandma's Kisses", "Krusty Love", "Krab Borg", and "The Smoking Peanut"

SpongeBob Goes Prehistoric
DVD details		Special features
9 segment episodes; 22 segment episodes (Triple Pack); 1.33:1 aspect ratio; Languages: English (Dolby Digital 2.0)		SpongeBob SquarePants: Battle for Bikini Bottom video game demo
Release dates		SpongeBob SquarePants: Battle for Bikini Bottom video game demo
Region 1		SpongeBob SquarePants: Battle for Bikini Bottom video game demo
March 9, 2004	June 2, 2015 (Triple Pack)	SpongeBob SquarePants: Battle for Bikini Bottom video game demo
Episodes
"Ugh", "Nature Pants", "Fools in April", "I'm with Stupid", "Patty Hype", "Squid on Strike", "The Great Snail Race", "Plankton's Army", and "Squilliam Returns"

SpongeGuard on Duty
DVD details	Special features
8 segment episodes; 1.33:1 aspect ratio; Languages: English (Dolby Digital 2.0)	Storyboards for "SpongeGuard on Duty" and "Clams"; This is the last themed DVD to have the Paramount DVD Menu Variant logo.
Release dates	Storyboards for "SpongeGuard on Duty" and "Clams"; This is the last themed DVD to have the Paramount DVD Menu Variant logo.
Region 1	Storyboards for "SpongeGuard on Duty" and "Clams"; This is the last themed DVD to have the Paramount DVD Menu Variant logo.
June 1, 2004	Storyboards for "SpongeGuard on Duty" and "Clams"; This is the last themed DVD to have the Paramount DVD Menu Variant logo.
Episodes
"SpongeGuard on Duty", "Naughty Nautical Neighbors", "Walking Small", "Pressure", "Jellyfish Hunter", "Nasty Patty", "Doing Time", and "Clams"

Sponge for Hire
DVD details	Special features
8 segment episodes; 1.33:1 aspect ratio; Languages: English (Dolby Digital 2.0)	Storyboards for: "Missing Identity"; "Krabby Land"; "Wet Painters"; "New Student Starfish"; Nicktoons Recipe Book featurette
Release dates	Storyboards for: "Missing Identity"; "Krabby Land"; "Wet Painters"; "New Student Starfish"; Nicktoons Recipe Book featurette
Region 1	Storyboards for: "Missing Identity"; "Krabby Land"; "Wet Painters"; "New Student Starfish"; Nicktoons Recipe Book featurette
November 2, 2004	Storyboards for: "Missing Identity"; "Krabby Land"; "Wet Painters"; "New Student Starfish"; Nicktoons Recipe Book featurette
Episodes
"Krusty Krab Training Video", "Can You Spare a Dime?", "Missing Identity", "Krabby Land", "Wet Painters", "New Student Starfish", "Mid-Life Crustacean", and "The Camping Episode"

Home Sweet Pineapple
DVD details		Special features
8 segment episodes; 22 segment episodes (Triple Pack); 1.33:1 aspect ratio; Languages: English (Dolby Digital 2.0)		Trailer for The SpongeBob SquarePants Movie; Cast Biographies
Release dates		Trailer for The SpongeBob SquarePants Movie; Cast Biographies
Region 1		Trailer for The SpongeBob SquarePants Movie; Cast Biographies
January 4, 2005	June 2, 2015 (Triple Pack)	Trailer for The SpongeBob SquarePants Movie; Cast Biographies
Episodes
"Home Sweet Pineapple", "Band Geeks", "Sandy, SpongeBob, and the Worm", "Ripped Pants", "Sandy's Rocket", "Culture Shock", "MuscleBob BuffPants", and "Employee of the Month"

Fear of a Krabby Patty
DVD details	Special features
8 segment episodes; 1.33:1 aspect ratio; Languages: English (Dolby Digital 2.0)	Animatics for "Fear of a Krabby Patty" and "Mermaid Man and Barnacle Boy V"; Super Suspicion Comic Book featurette
Release dates	Animatics for "Fear of a Krabby Patty" and "Mermaid Man and Barnacle Boy V"; Super Suspicion Comic Book featurette
Region 1	Animatics for "Fear of a Krabby Patty" and "Mermaid Man and Barnacle Boy V"; Super Suspicion Comic Book featurette
May 24, 2005	Animatics for "Fear of a Krabby Patty" and "Mermaid Man and Barnacle Boy V"; Super Suspicion Comic Book featurette
Episodes
"Fear of a Krabby Patty", "Shell of a Man", "Arrgh!", "Neptune's Spatula", "One Krabs Trash", "Mermaid Man and Barnacle Boy V", "Karate Choppers", and "I'm Your Biggest Fanatic"

Absorbing Favorites
DVD details	Special features
9 segment episodes; 1.33:1 aspect ratio; Languages: English (Dolby Digital 2.0)	Ripped Pants Karaoke music video; Bikini Bottom Personality Quiz featurette
Release dates	Ripped Pants Karaoke music video; Bikini Bottom Personality Quiz featurette
Region 1	Ripped Pants Karaoke music video; Bikini Bottom Personality Quiz featurette
September 20, 2005	Ripped Pants Karaoke music video; Bikini Bottom Personality Quiz featurette
Episodes
"Ripped Pants", "Mermaid Man and Barnacle Boy", "Karate Choppers", "Gary Takes a Bath", "Jellyfish Hunter", "The Fry Cook Games", "Club SpongeBob", "Plankton's Army", and "The Sponge Who Could Fly"

Where's Gary?
DVD details		Special features
6 segment episodes; 22 segment episodes (Triple Pack); 1.33:1 aspect ratio; Languages: English (Dolby Digital 5.1)		Gary Come Home Karaoke music video
Release dates		Gary Come Home Karaoke music video
Region 1		Gary Come Home Karaoke music video
November 15, 2005	June 2, 2015 (Triple Pack)	Gary Come Home Karaoke music video
Episodes
"Have You Seen This Snail?", "The Lost Mattress", "Krabs vs. Plankton", "Good Neighbors", "Skill Crane", and "The Great Snail Race"

Lost in Time
DVD details	Special features
6 segment episodes; 1.33:1 aspect ratio; Languages: English (Dolby Digital 5.1)	Medieval Moments Jousting Practice featurette
Release dates	Medieval Moments Jousting Practice featurette
Region 1	Medieval Moments Jousting Practice featurette
February 21, 2006	Medieval Moments Jousting Practice featurette
Episodes
"Dunces and Dragons", "Selling Out", "Funny Pants", "Mermaid Man and Barnacle Boy VI: The Motion Picture", "Enemy In-Law", and "Patrick SmartPants"

Karate Island
DVD details	Special features
7 segment episodes; 1.33:1 aspect ratio; Languages: English (Dolby Digital 5.1)	SpongeBob's Karate Chops featurette
Release dates	SpongeBob's Karate Chops featurette
Region 1	SpongeBob's Karate Chops featurette
July 18, 2006	SpongeBob's Karate Chops featurette
Episodes
"SquidBob TentaclePants", "Krusty Towers", "Mrs. Puff, You're Fired", "Ghost Host", "Wishing You Well", "Karate Island", and "New Leaf"

Whale of a Birthday
DVD details		Special features
7 segment episodes; 18 segment episodes (Triple Pack); 1.33:1 aspect ratio; Languages: English (Dolby Digital 5.1)		Your Brain on SpongeBob clips from: "Jellyfishing"; "Suds"; "SB-129"; "F.U.N."; "The Bully"; DVD-Rom game for Nick Arcade
Release dates		Your Brain on SpongeBob clips from: "Jellyfishing"; "Suds"; "SB-129"; "F.U.N."; "The Bully"; DVD-Rom game for Nick Arcade
Region 1		Your Brain on SpongeBob clips from: "Jellyfishing"; "Suds"; "SB-129"; "F.U.N."; "The Bully"; DVD-Rom game for Nick Arcade
October 31, 2006	March 13, 2012 (Triple Pack)	Your Brain on SpongeBob clips from: "Jellyfishing"; "Suds"; "SB-129"; "F.U.N."; "The Bully"; DVD-Rom game for Nick Arcade
Episodes
"All That Glitters", "Whale of a Birthday", "Once Bitten", "Chimps Ahoy", "Bummer Vacation", "Wigstruck", and "That's No Lady"

Friend or Foe?
DVD details	Special features
7 segment episodes; 1.33:1 aspect ratio; Languages: English (Dolby Digital 5.1)	Animatic for "Friend or Foe"; Plankton and Krabs Photo Gallery featurette
Release dates	Animatic for "Friend or Foe"; Plankton and Krabs Photo Gallery featurette
Region 1	Animatic for "Friend or Foe"; Plankton and Krabs Photo Gallery featurette
April 17, 2007; September 25, 2012 (re-release)	Animatic for "Friend or Foe"; Plankton and Krabs Photo Gallery featurette
Episodes
"Friend or Foe", "The Original Fry Cook", "Night Light", "Rise and Shine", "Waiting", "Fungus Among Us", and "Spy Buddies"

Bikini Bottom Adventures
DVD details	Special features
7 segment episodes; 1.33:1 aspect ratio; Languages: English (Dolby Digital 5.1)	Animatic for "Breath of Fresh Squidward"; Getting to Know the Bikini Bottomites featurette
Release dates	Animatic for "Breath of Fresh Squidward"; Getting to Know the Bikini Bottomites featurette
Region 1	Animatic for "Breath of Fresh Squidward"; Getting to Know the Bikini Bottomites featurette
June 5, 2007	Animatic for "Breath of Fresh Squidward"; Getting to Know the Bikini Bottomites featurette
Episodes
"Boat Smarts", "Good Ol' Whatshisname", "New Digs", "Krabs à La Mode", "Roller Cowards", "Bucket Sweet Bucket", and "Breath of Fresh Squidward"

SpongeBob's Atlantis SquarePantis
DVD details	Special features
7 segment episodes; 1.33:1 aspect ratio; Languages: English (Dolby Digital 5.1)	Featurettes: Inside the SpongeBob Animation Studios; Behind the Pantis
Release dates	Featurettes: Inside the SpongeBob Animation Studios; Behind the Pantis
Region 1	Featurettes: Inside the SpongeBob Animation Studios; Behind the Pantis
November 13, 2007; September 25, 2012 (re-release)	Featurettes: Inside the SpongeBob Animation Studios; Behind the Pantis
Episodes
"Atlantis SquarePantis", "Money Talks", "SpongeBob vs. the Patty Gadget", "Slimy Dancing", "The Krusty Sponge", "Sing a Song of Patrick", and "Picture Day"

To Love a Patty
DVD details	Special features
7 segment episodes; 1.33:1 aspect ratio; Languages: English (Dolby Digital 5.1)	Animatic for "To Love a Patty"; Music videos: I Can't Keep My Eyes Off of You; To Love a Patty
Release dates	Animatic for "To Love a Patty"; Music videos: I Can't Keep My Eyes Off of You; To Love a Patty
Region 1	Animatic for "To Love a Patty"; Music videos: I Can't Keep My Eyes Off of You; To Love a Patty
January 29, 2008	Animatic for "To Love a Patty"; Music videos: I Can't Keep My Eyes Off of You; To Love a Patty
Episodes
"To Love a Patty", "A Flea in Her Dome", "Mermaid Man vs. SpongeBob", "Le Big Switch", "The Donut of Shame", "BlackJack", and "Blackened Sponge"

SpongeBob's Pest of the West
DVD details	Special features
7 segment episodes; 1.33:1 aspect ratio; Languages: English (Dolby Digital 5.1)	Animatic for "Pest of the West"; Shorts: Sea Horse Riding Made Easy; Spurskate; Saloon Door Sorrows; Yokel to Tough Guy
Release dates	Animatic for "Pest of the West"; Shorts: Sea Horse Riding Made Easy; Spurskate; Saloon Door Sorrows; Yokel to Tough Guy
Region 1	Animatic for "Pest of the West"; Shorts: Sea Horse Riding Made Easy; Spurskate; Saloon Door Sorrows; Yokel to Tough Guy
April 15, 2008; September 25, 2012 (re-release)	Animatic for "Pest of the West"; Shorts: Sea Horse Riding Made Easy; Spurskate; Saloon Door Sorrows; Yokel to Tough Guy
Episodes
"Pest of the West", "The Krusty Plate", "Pat No Pay", "The Inmates of Summer", "To Save a Squirrel", "20,000 Patties Under the Sea", and "The Battle of Bikini Bottom"

SpongeBob's WhoBob WhatPants?
DVD details		Special features
6 segment episodes; 18 segment episodes (Triple Pack); 1.33:1 aspect ratio; Languages: English (Dolby Digital 5.1)		Animatic for "What Ever Happened to SpongeBob?"; Shorts: What if SpongeBob Was Gone? (Gary); What if SpongeBob Was Gone? (Sandy); What if SpongeBob Was Gone? (Mr. Krabs); What if SpongeBob Was Gone? (Patrick)
Release dates		Animatic for "What Ever Happened to SpongeBob?"; Shorts: What if SpongeBob Was Gone? (Gary); What if SpongeBob Was Gone? (Sandy); What if SpongeBob Was Gone? (Mr. Krabs); What if SpongeBob Was Gone? (Patrick)
Region 1		Animatic for "What Ever Happened to SpongeBob?"; Shorts: What if SpongeBob Was Gone? (Gary); What if SpongeBob Was Gone? (Sandy); What if SpongeBob Was Gone? (Mr. Krabs); What if SpongeBob Was Gone? (Patrick)
October 14, 2008	March 13, 2012 (Triple Pack)	Animatic for "What Ever Happened to SpongeBob?"; Shorts: What if SpongeBob Was Gone? (Gary); What if SpongeBob Was Gone? (Sandy); What if SpongeBob Was Gone? (Mr. Krabs); What if SpongeBob Was Gone? (Patrick)
Episodes
"What Ever Happened to SpongeBob?", "Goo Goo Gas", "The Two Faces of Squidward", "SpongeHenge", "Banned in Bikini Bottom", and "Stanley S. SquarePants"

Spongicus
DVD details	Special features
8 segment episodes; 1.33:1 aspect ratio; Languages: English (Dolby Digital 5.1)	Storyboard panels; Character art
Release dates	Storyboard panels; Character art
Region 1	Storyboard panels; Character art
January 27, 2009	Storyboard panels; Character art
Episodes
"Spongicus", "Suction Cup Symphony", "House Fancy", "Krabby Road", "Penny Foolish", "Nautical Novice", "Not Normal", and "Gone"

SpongeBob vs. The Big One
DVD details	Special features
7 segment episodes; 1.33:1 aspect ratio; Languages: English (Dolby Digital 5.1)	Plankton's Special Sinister Commentary featurette; Ridin' the Hook music video
Release dates	Plankton's Special Sinister Commentary featurette; Ridin' the Hook music video
Region 1	Plankton's Special Sinister Commentary featurette; Ridin' the Hook music video
March 3, 2009; September 25, 2012 (re-release)	Plankton's Special Sinister Commentary featurette; Ridin' the Hook music video
Episodes
"SpongeBob SquarePants vs. The Big One", "A Life in a Day", "Sun Bleached", "Giant Squidward", "No Nose Knows", "Patty Caper", and "Plankton's Regular"

10 Happiest Moments
DVD details		Special features
10 segment episodes (plus Help Wanted); 24 segment episodes (plus Help Wanted) (Triple Pack); 1.33:1 aspect ratio; Languages: English (Dolby Digital 5.1)		"Help Wanted"
Release dates		"Help Wanted"
Region 1		"Help Wanted"
June 9, 2009	January 13, 2015 (Triple Pack)	"Help Wanted"
Episodes
"Tea at the Treedome", "Mermaid Man and Barnacle Boy", "Culture Shock", "Karate Choppers", "The Algae's Always Greener", "Just One Bite", "Graveyard Shift", "No Weenies Allowed", "Roller Cowards", and "Christmas Who?"

To SquarePants or Not to SquarePants
DVD details	Special features
8 segment episodes; 1.33:1 aspect ratio; Languages: English (Dolby Digital 5.1)	Storyboard panels; Character art
Release dates	Storyboard panels; Character art
Region 1	Storyboard panels; Character art
July 21, 2009	Storyboard panels; Character art
Episodes
"To SquarePants or Not to SquarePants", "Squid's Visit", "The Splinter", "Slide Whistle Stooges", "Boating Buddies", "The Krabby Kronicle", "The Slumber Party", and "Grooming Gary"

SpongeBob's Truth or Square
DVD details		Special features
5 segment episodes; 18 segment episodes (Triple Pack); 1.33:1 aspect ratio; Languages: English (Dolby Digital 5.1)		Behind the Scenes of the SpongeBob Opening featurette; Music videos: We've Got Scurvy; Campfire Song Song; The F.U.N. Song
Release dates		Behind the Scenes of the SpongeBob Opening featurette; Music videos: We've Got Scurvy; Campfire Song Song; The F.U.N. Song
Region 1		Behind the Scenes of the SpongeBob Opening featurette; Music videos: We've Got Scurvy; Campfire Song Song; The F.U.N. Song
November 10, 2009	March 13, 2012 (Triple Pack)	Behind the Scenes of the SpongeBob Opening featurette; Music videos: We've Got Scurvy; Campfire Song Song; The F.U.N. Song
Episodes
"Truth or Square" (extended version), "Porous Pockets", "Choir Boys", "Krusty Krushers", and "The Card"

Viking-Sized Adventures
DVD details		Special features
8 segment episodes; 22 segment episodes (Triple Pack); 1.33:1 aspect ratio; Languages: English (Dolby Digital 5.1)		Storyboard panels; Character art
Release dates		Storyboard panels; Character art
Region 1		Storyboard panels; Character art
January 26, 2010	July 24, 2012 (Triple Pack)	Storyboard panels; Character art
Episodes
"Dear Vikings", "Ditchin'", "Pineapple Fever", "Chum Caverns", "Grandpappy the Pirate", "Cephalopod Lodge", "Shuffleboarding", and "Professor Squidward"

SpongeBob's Last Stand
DVD details		Special features
7 segment episodes; 22 segment episodes (Triple Pack); 1.33:1 aspect ratio; Languages: English (Dolby Digital 5.1)		Neptune's Party sneak peek; How to Make SpongeBob SquarePants featurette; Music videos: Bollywood Bob; Give Jellyfish Fields a Chance Karaoke; The Jellyfishing Song Karaoke
Release dates		Neptune's Party sneak peek; How to Make SpongeBob SquarePants featurette; Music videos: Bollywood Bob; Give Jellyfish Fields a Chance Karaoke; The Jellyfishing Song Karaoke
Region 1		Neptune's Party sneak peek; How to Make SpongeBob SquarePants featurette; Music videos: Bollywood Bob; Give Jellyfish Fields a Chance Karaoke; The Jellyfishing Song Karaoke
March 16, 2010	July 24, 2012 (Triple Pack)	Neptune's Party sneak peek; How to Make SpongeBob SquarePants featurette; Music videos: Bollywood Bob; Give Jellyfish Fields a Chance Karaoke; The Jellyfishing Song Karaoke
Episodes
"SpongeBob's Last Stand", "Pet or Pests", "Komputer Overload", "Gullible Pants", "Overbooked", "No Hat for Pat", and "Toy Store of Doom"

Triton's Revenge
DVD details		Special features
7 segment episodes; 22 segment episodes (Triple Pack); 1.33:1 aspect ratio; Languages: English (Dolby Digital 5.1)		Shorts: SpongeGod; The Story of King Neptune; Bonus Fanboy & Chum Chum episodes: "Wizboy"; "Pick a Nose"
Release dates		Shorts: SpongeGod; The Story of King Neptune; Bonus Fanboy & Chum Chum episodes: "Wizboy"; "Pick a Nose"
Region 1		Shorts: SpongeGod; The Story of King Neptune; Bonus Fanboy & Chum Chum episodes: "Wizboy"; "Pick a Nose"
July 13, 2010	July 24, 2012 (Triple Pack)	Shorts: SpongeGod; The Story of King Neptune; Bonus Fanboy & Chum Chum episodes: "Wizboy"; "Pick a Nose"
Episodes
"The Clash of Triton", "Sand Castles in the Sand", "Shell Shocked", "Chum Bucket Supreme", "Single Cell Anniversary", "Tentacle-Vision", and "I ♥ Dancing"

Legends of Bikini Bottom
DVD details		Special features
6 segment episodes; 24 segment episodes (plus Help Wanted) (Triple Pack); 1.33:1 aspect ratio; Languages: English (Dolby Digital 5.1)		Shorts: SpongeBob's Legendary Dance Party; Things to Do When Encountering Legendary Creatures; The Legend of SpongeBob; Behind the Scenes: Legends of Bikini Bottom featurette
Release dates		Shorts: SpongeBob's Legendary Dance Party; Things to Do When Encountering Legendary Creatures; The Legend of SpongeBob; Behind the Scenes: Legends of Bikini Bottom featurette
Region 1		Shorts: SpongeBob's Legendary Dance Party; Things to Do When Encountering Legendary Creatures; The Legend of SpongeBob; Behind the Scenes: Legends of Bikini Bottom featurette
November 16, 2010	January 13, 2015 (Triple Pack)	Shorts: SpongeBob's Legendary Dance Party; Things to Do When Encountering Legendary Creatures; The Legend of SpongeBob; Behind the Scenes: Legends of Bikini Bottom featurette
Episodes
"The Monster Who Came to Bikini Bottom", "Welcome to the Bikini Bottom Triangle", "The Main Drain", "Trenchbillies", "Sponge-Cano!", and "The Curse of the Hex"

The Great Patty Caper
DVD details	Special features
7 segment episodes; 1.33:1 aspect ratio; Languages: English (Dolby Digital 5.1)	Shorts: GumShoe SquarePants; SpongeLock Holmes and Dr. Patson; What if the Mystery Ended This Way...?
Release dates	Shorts: GumShoe SquarePants; SpongeLock Holmes and Dr. Patson; What if the Mystery Ended This Way...?
Region 1	Shorts: GumShoe SquarePants; SpongeLock Holmes and Dr. Patson; What if the Mystery Ended This Way...?
March 8, 2011	Shorts: GumShoe SquarePants; SpongeLock Holmes and Dr. Patson; What if the Mystery Ended This Way...?
Episodes
"The Great Patty Caper", "Growth Spout", "Stuck in the Wringer", "Someone's in the Kitchen with Sandy", "The Inside Job", "Greasy Buffoons", and "Model Sponge"

Heroes of Bikini Bottom
DVD details		Special features
8 segment episodes; 24 segment episodes (plus Help Wanted) (Triple Pack); 1.33:1 aspect ratio; Languages: English (Dolby Digital 5.1)		Shorts: Time Machine; Lessons Learned; And Krabs Saves the Day; Bonus T.U.F.F. Puppy episodes: "Mall Rat"; "Operation: Happy Birthday"
Release dates		Shorts: Time Machine; Lessons Learned; And Krabs Saves the Day; Bonus T.U.F.F. Puppy episodes: "Mall Rat"; "Operation: Happy Birthday"
Region 1		Shorts: Time Machine; Lessons Learned; And Krabs Saves the Day; Bonus T.U.F.F. Puppy episodes: "Mall Rat"; "Operation: Happy Birthday"
June 14, 2011	January 13, 2015 (Triple Pack)	Shorts: Time Machine; Lessons Learned; And Krabs Saves the Day; Bonus T.U.F.F. Puppy episodes: "Mall Rat"; "Operation: Happy Birthday"
Episodes
"Back to the Past", "The Bad Guy Club for Villains", "Keep Bikini Bottom Beautiful", "A Pal for Gary", "Yours, Mine, and Mine", "Kracked Krabs", "A Day Without Tears", and "Summer Job"

SpongeBob's Runaway Roadtrip
DVD details	Special features
5 segment episodes (plus 2 bonus segment episodes); 1.33:1 aspect ratio; Languages: English (Dolby Digital 5.1)	Bonus episodes: "Hide and Then What Happens?"; "Shellback Shenanigans"
Release dates	Bonus episodes: "Hide and Then What Happens?"; "Shellback Shenanigans"
Region 1	Bonus episodes: "Hide and Then What Happens?"; "Shellback Shenanigans"
September 20, 2011	Bonus episodes: "Hide and Then What Happens?"; "Shellback Shenanigans"
Episodes
"A SquarePants Family Vacation", "Patrick's Staycation", "Walking the Plankton", "Mooncation", and "Mr. Krabs Takes a Vacation"

SpongeBob's Frozen Face-Off
DVD details	Special features
7 segment episodes; 1.33:1 aspect ratio; Languages: English (Dolby Digital 5.1)	Bonus Fanboy & Chum Chum episodes: "The Last Strawberry Fun Finger"; "Power Out"; Bonus T.U.F.F. Puppy episodes: "Snappy Campers"; "Lucky Duck"
Release dates	Bonus Fanboy & Chum Chum episodes: "The Last Strawberry Fun Finger"; "Power Out"; Bonus T.U.F.F. Puppy episodes: "Snappy Campers"; "Lucky Duck"
Region 1	Bonus Fanboy & Chum Chum episodes: "The Last Strawberry Fun Finger"; "Power Out"; Bonus T.U.F.F. Puppy episodes: "Snappy Campers"; "Lucky Duck"
January 10, 2012	Bonus Fanboy & Chum Chum episodes: "The Last Strawberry Fun Finger"; "Power Out"; Bonus T.U.F.F. Puppy episodes: "Snappy Campers"; "Lucky Duck"
Episodes
"Frozen Face-Off", "Accidents Will Happen", "The Other Patty", "Drive Thru", "The Hot Shot", "A Friendly Game", and "Sentimental Sponge"

Ghoul Fools
DVD details	Special features
7 segment episodes; 1.33:1 aspect ratio; Languages: English (Dolby Digital 5.1)	None
Release dates	None
Region 1	None
August 28, 2012	None
Episodes
"Ghoul Fools", "The Curse of Bikini Bottom", "Ghost Host", "Born Again Krabs", "Arrgh!", "Your Shoe's Untied", and "Money Talks"

It's a SpongeBob Christmas!
DVD details		Special features
1 segment episode (DVD Version); 11 segment episodes (Blu-ray Version); 1.78:1 aspect ratio; Languages: English (Dolby Digital 5.1)		Animatic for "It's a SpongeBob Christmas!"; Behind the Scenes: A Change of Sea-Nery featurette; Music videos: Santa Has His Eye on Me; Hot Fruitcake; Yule Log
Release dates		Animatic for "It's a SpongeBob Christmas!"; Behind the Scenes: A Change of Sea-Nery featurette; Music videos: Santa Has His Eye on Me; Hot Fruitcake; Yule Log
Region 1		Animatic for "It's a SpongeBob Christmas!"; Behind the Scenes: A Change of Sea-Nery featurette; Music videos: Santa Has His Eye on Me; Hot Fruitcake; Yule Log
November 6, 2012	October 15, 2013 (Blu-ray)	Animatic for "It's a SpongeBob Christmas!"; Behind the Scenes: A Change of Sea-Nery featurette; Music videos: Santa Has His Eye on Me; Hot Fruitcake; Yule Log
Episodes
"It's a SpongeBob Christmas!" (DVD Version); "It's a SpongeBob Christmas!", "Ripped Pants", "SB-129", "Texas", Graveyard Shift", "Something Smells", "Jellyfishing", "Dying for Pie", "Wormy", "F.U.N.", and "Club SpongeBob" (Blu-ray Version)

Extreme Kah-Rah-Tay
DVD details	Special features
8 segment episodes; 1.33:1 aspect ratio; Languages: English (Dolby Digital 5.1)	None
Release dates	None
Region 1	None
January 15, 2013	None
Episodes
"Squid Defense", "The Way of the Sponge", "House Sittin' for Sandy", "The Krabby Patty That Ate Bikini Bottom", "Squirrel Record", "Extreme Spots", "Face Freeze!", and "Demolition Doofus"

SpongeBob and Friends: Patrick SquarePants
DVD details	Special features
14 segment episodes; 1.33:1 aspect ratio; Languages: English (Dolby Digital 5.1)	None
Release dates	None
Region 1	None
January 14, 2014	None
Episodes
"Big Pink Loser", "The Secret Box", "I'm with Stupid", "New Student Starfish", "Dunces and Dragons", "Patrick SmartPants", "That's No Lady", "Driven to Tears", "The Gift of Gum", "Karate Star", "Big Sister Sam", "Squidward's School for Grown-Ups", "The Googly Artiste", and "Pet Sitter Pat"

SpongeBob, You're Fired!
DVD details	Special features
14 segment episodes; 1.33:1 aspect ratio; Languages: English (Dolby Digital 5.1)	None
Release dates	None
Region 1	None
April 29, 2014	None
Episodes
"SpongeBob, You're Fired!", "Neptune's Spatula", "Welcome to the Chum Bucket", "The Original Fry Cook", "Le Big Switch", "Model Sponge", "Employee of the Month", "Bossy Boots", "Krusty Dogs", "License to Milkshake", "Help Wanted", "Wet Painters", "Krusty Krab Training Video", and "Pizza Delivery"

The Pilot a Mini-Movie and the Square Shorts
DVD details	Special features
3 segment episodes; 1.33:1 aspect ratio; Languages: English (Dolby Digital 5.1)	None
Release dates	None
Region 1	None
January 6, 2015	None
Episodes
"Help Wanted", "Reef Blower", and "Truth or Square" (TV version)

The Adventures of SpongeBob SquarePants
DVD details	Special features
9 segment episodes; 1.33:1 aspect ratio; Languages: English (Dolby Stereo); French (Dolby Stereo); Spanish (Dolby Stereo)	None
Release dates	None
Region 1	None
September 22, 2015	None
Episodes
"Patrick-Man!", "Mermaid Man Begins", "Mermaid Man and Barnacle Boy", "Mermaid Man and Barnacle Boy II", "Mermaid Man and Barnacle Boy III", "Mermaid Man and Barnacle Boy IV", "Mermaid Man and Barnacle Boy V", "Mermaid Man and Barnacle Boy VI: The Motion Picture", and "Mermaid Man vs. SpongeBob"

The Legend of Boo-Kini Bottom
DVD details	Special features
1 segment episode; 1.78:1 aspect ratio; Languages: English (Dolby Digital 5.1); Spanish (Dolby Stereo); French (Dolby Stereo)	Behind the Scenes: The Legend of Boo-Kini Bottom; The Art of SpongeBob SquarePants: The Legend of Boo-Kini Bottom
Release dates	Behind the Scenes: The Legend of Boo-Kini Bottom; The Art of SpongeBob SquarePants: The Legend of Boo-Kini Bottom
Region 1	Behind the Scenes: The Legend of Boo-Kini Bottom; The Art of SpongeBob SquarePants: The Legend of Boo-Kini Bottom
September 11, 2018	Behind the Scenes: The Legend of Boo-Kini Bottom; The Art of SpongeBob SquarePants: The Legend of Boo-Kini Bottom
Episodes
"The Legend of Boo-Kini Bottom"

Bikini Bottom Bash
DVD details	Special features
5 segment episodes; 1.33:1 aspect ratio; Languages: English (Dolby Digital 5.1); Spanish (Dolby Stereo); French (Dolby Stereo)	None
Release dates	None
Region 1	None
April 28, 2020	None
Episodes
"SpongeBob's Big Birthday Blowout," "Sun Bleached," "The Slumber Party," "Party Pooper Pants," and "Truth or Square"

== VHS releases ==
Title	Release date	SxEs	Episodes
Nautical Nonsense	March 12, 2002	1x2b	Ripped Pants
Nautical Nonsense	March 12, 2002	1x14a	SB-129
Nautical Nonsense	March 12, 2002	1x18a	Texas
Nautical Nonsense	March 12, 2002	2x16a	Graveyard Shift
Nautical Nonsense	March 12, 2002	2x2a	Something Smells
Sponge Buddies	March 12, 2002	1x3a	Jellyfishing
Sponge Buddies	March 12, 2002	2x4a	Dying for Pie
Sponge Buddies	March 12, 2002	2x5a	Wormy
Sponge Buddies	March 12, 2002	1x10b	F.U.N.
Sponge Buddies	March 12, 2002	3x2a	Club SpongeBob
Undersea Antics Volume 1 (Blockbuster exclusive)	2002	1x2b	Ripped Pants
Undersea Antics Volume 1 (Blockbuster exclusive)	2002	1x14a	SB-129
Undersea Antics Volume 1 (Blockbuster exclusive)	2002	1x18a	Texas
Undersea Antics Volume 1 (Blockbuster exclusive)	2002	2x16a	Graveyard Shift
Undersea Antics Volume 1 (Blockbuster exclusive)	2002	2x2a	Something Smells
Undersea Antics Volume 1 (Blockbuster exclusive)	2002	1x3a	Jellyfishing
Undersea Antics Volume 1 (Blockbuster exclusive)	2002	2x4a	Dying for Pie
Undersea Antics Volume 1 (Blockbuster exclusive)	2002	2x5a	Wormy
Undersea Antics Volume 1 (Blockbuster exclusive)	2002	1x10b	F.U.N.
Undersea Antics Volume 1 (Blockbuster exclusive)	2002	3x2a	Club SpongeBob
Halloween	August 27, 2002	1x13a	Scaredy Pants
Halloween	August 27, 2002	2x4b	Imitation Krabs
Halloween	August 27, 2002	2x14b	Frankendoodle
Halloween	August 27, 2002	1x13b	I Was a Teenage Gary
Halloween	August 27, 2002	1x11b	Squidward the Unfriendly Ghost
Sea Stories	November 5, 2002	2x13	Shanghaied
Sea Stories	November 5, 2002	2x13	Gary Takes a Bath
Sea Stories	November 5, 2002	1x20a	Hooky
Sea Stories	November 5, 2002	2x7b	Life of Crime
Sea Stories	November 5, 2002	1x6b	Pickles
Bikini Bottom Bash!	January 28, 2003	3x11	Party Pooper Pants
Bikini Bottom Bash!	January 28, 2003	1x7a	Hall Monitor
Bikini Bottom Bash!	January 28, 2003	3x16b	I Had an Accident
Bikini Bottom Bash!	January 28, 2003	1x16a	Valentine's Day
Deep Sea Sillies	January 28, 2003	3x3a	Just One Bite
Deep Sea Sillies	January 28, 2003	1x6a	Mermaid Man and Barnacle Boy
Deep Sea Sillies	January 28, 2003	1x1c	Tea at the Treedome
Deep Sea Sillies	January 28, 2003	1x16b	The Paper
Deep Sea Sillies	January 28, 2003	3x16a	Born Again Krabs
The Sponge Who Could Fly	March 4, 2003	3x19	The Sponge Who Could Fly
The Sponge Who Could Fly	March 4, 2003	1x3b	Plankton!
The Sponge Who Could Fly	March 4, 2003	1x4b	Boating School
The Sponge Who Could Fly	March 4, 2003	1x15b	Suds
Anchors Away	March 4, 2003	1x12a	The Chaperone
Anchors Away	March 4, 2003	1x20b	Mermaid Man and Barnacle Boy II
Anchors Away	March 4, 2003	2x3b	Bubble Buddy
Anchors Away	March 4, 2003	2x1a	Your Shoe's Untied
Anchors Away	March 4, 2003	2x7a	Prehibernation Week
Laugh Your Pants Off	July 29, 2003	2x11a	Mermaid Man and Barnacle Boy III
Laugh Your Pants Off	July 29, 2003	2x3a	Big Pink Loser
Laugh Your Pants Off	July 29, 2003	1x9b	Opposite Day
Laugh Your Pants Off	July 29, 2003	2x11b	Squirrel Jokes
Laugh Your Pants Off	July 29, 2003	3x9b	Rock-a-Bye Bivalve
Sponge-a-Rama	July 29, 2003	2x9b	Dumped
Sponge-a-Rama	July 29, 2003	2x2b	Bossy Boots
Sponge-a-Rama	July 29, 2003	3x3b	The Bully
Sponge-a-Rama	July 29, 2003	1x15a	Sleepy Time
Sponge-a-Rama	July 29, 2003	2x6b	Squidville
Christmas	September 30, 2003	2x8	Christmas Who?
Christmas	September 30, 2003	2x17a	Procrastination
Christmas	September 30, 2003	3x6a	Snowball Effect
Christmas	September 30, 2003	2x9a	Survival of the Idiots
The Seascape Capers	January 6, 2004	2x19b	The Fry Cook Games
The Seascape Capers	January 6, 2004	1x2a	Bubblestand
The Seascape Capers	January 6, 2004	2x1b	Squid's Day Off
The Seascape Capers	January 6, 2004	3x20	SpongeBob Meets the Strangler
The Seascape Capers	January 6, 2004	3x20	Pranks a Lot
SpongeBob Goes Prehistoric	March 9, 2004	3x14	Ugh
SpongeBob Goes Prehistoric	March 9, 2004	1x9a	Nature Pants
SpongeBob Goes Prehistoric	March 9, 2004	1x19a	Fools in April
SpongeBob Goes Prehistoric	March 9, 2004	2x17b	I'm with Stupid
SpongeGuard on Duty	June 1, 2004	3x1b	SpongeGuard on Duty
SpongeGuard on Duty	June 1, 2004	1x4a	Naughty Nautical Neighbors
SpongeGuard on Duty	June 1, 2004	1x18b	Walking Small
SpongeGuard on Duty	June 1, 2004	2x12a	Pressure
SpongeGuard on Duty	June 1, 2004	2x19a	Jellyfish Hunter
Sponge for Hire	November 2, 2004	3x10b	Krusty Krab Training Video
Sponge for Hire	November 2, 2004	3x7b	Can You Spare a Dime?
Sponge for Hire	November 2, 2004	3x18a	Missing Identity
Sponge for Hire	November 2, 2004	3x17a	Krabby Land
Sponge for Hire	November 2, 2004	3x10a	Wet Painters
Home Sweet Pineapple	January 4, 2005	1x5b	Home Sweet Pineapple
Home Sweet Pineapple	January 4, 2005	2x15b	Band Geeks
Home Sweet Pineapple	January 4, 2005	2x20b	Sandy, SpongeBob, and the Worm
Home Sweet Pineapple	January 4, 2005	1x2b	Ripped Pants
Home Sweet Pineapple	January 4, 2005	1x8a	Sandy's Rocket
Fear of a Krabby Patty	May 24, 2005	4x1	Fear of a Krabby Patty
Fear of a Krabby Patty	May 24, 2005	4x1	Shell of a Man
Fear of a Krabby Patty	May 24, 2005	1x17a	Arrgh!
Fear of a Krabby Patty	May 24, 2005	1x19a	Neptune's Spatula
Fear of a Krabby Patty	May 24, 2005	3x6b	One Krab's Trash
Absorbing Favorites	September 20, 2005	1x2b	Ripped Pants
Absorbing Favorites	September 20, 2005	1x6a	Mermaid Man and Barnacle Boy
Absorbing Favorites	September 20, 2005	1x14b	Karate Choppers
Absorbing Favorites	September 20, 2005	2x13b	Gary Takes a Bath
Absorbing Favorites	September 20, 2005	2x19a	Jellyfish Hunter
Where's Gary?	November 15, 2005	4x3	Have You Seen This Snail?
Where's Gary?	November 15, 2005	4x2	The Lost Mattress
Where's Gary?	November 15, 2005	4x2	Krabs vs. Plankton
Where's Gary?	November 15, 2005	4x4b	Good Neighbors
Lost in Time	February 21, 2006	4x6	Dunces and Dragons
Lost in Time	February 21, 2006	4x5	Selling Out
Lost in Time	February 21, 2006	4x5	Funny Pants
Lost in Time	February 21, 2006	4x7b	Mermaid Man & Barnacle Boy VI: The Motion Picture

== Other releases including SpongeBob SquarePants episodes ==
Title	Format	Episode Count	Release date	SxEs	Episode Title	Notes
Nickstravaganza!	VHS	1	March 4, 2003	2x06a	Grandma's Kisses	Exclusively sold at Wal-Mart.
Nickelodeon DVD Sampler	DVD	1	July 2, 2002	1x04b	Boating School	Exclusive bonus disc packaged with copies of the Jimmy Neutron: Boy Genius DVD sold at Best Buy.
Nicktoons Halloween	DVD	1	August 26, 2003	1x13a	Scaredy Pants	
Nicktoons Christmas	DVD	1	September 30, 2003	2x08	Christmas Who?	
Nick Picks Vol. 1	DVD	1	May 24, 2005	3x14	Ugh	
Nick Picks Vol. 2	DVD	2	October 18, 2005	2x17b	I'm with Stupid	
Nick Picks Vol. 2	DVD	2	October 18, 2005	3x20a	SpongeBob Meets the Strangler	
Nick Picks Vol. 3	DVD	1	February 7, 2006	4x01a	Fear of a Krabby Patty	
Nick Picks Vol. 4	DVD	1	June 6, 2006	4x03	Have You Seen This Snail?	
Nick Picks Holiday	DVD	1	September 26, 2006	2x08	Christmas Who?	
Nick Picks Vol. 5	DVD	1	March 13, 2007	4x06	Dunces and Dragons	
Nickelodeon Kids' Choice Winners' Collection	DVD	1	March 13, 2007	4x09a	Krusty Towers	Exclusively sold at Wal-Mart.
Heroes in Action!	DVD	2	July 8, 2014	9x02	Patrick-Man!	
Heroes in Action!	DVD	2	July 8, 2014	9x02	Gary's New Toy	
Robot Invasion	DVD	2	July 8, 2014	3x09	Krab Borg	
Robot Invasion	DVD	2	July 8, 2014	3x09	Rock-a-Bye Bivalve	
