= 2024 in animation =

2024 in animation is an overview of notable events, including notable awards, list of films released, television show debuts and endings, and notable deaths.

== Events ==
=== January ===
- January 1:
  - The first Mickey Mouse short film, Steamboat Willie, entered the public domain in the United States.
  - Among the twenty-one titles, Abby Hatcher, Butterbean's Café, Nella the Princess Knight, Sunny Day and T.U.F.F. Puppy were removed from Paramount+.
- January 4: The series premiere of Studio Trigger's anime adaptation of Delicious in Dungeon was released on Netflix.
- January 7:
  - Grimsburg premiered on Fox as a sneak preview.
  - Season 4 of The Great North premiered on Fox with the episode "Bad Speecher Adventure".
- January 11: The third and final season of Sonic Prime premiered on Netflix.
- January 12: Disney and Pixar's Soul was released in theaters, after being a stream-exclusive on Disney+ on December 25, 2020, due to the COVID-19 pandemic.
- January 13:
  - The Ghost and Molly McGee ended on Disney Channel, with the episodes "Jinx vs. the Human World" and "The End".
  - Craig Before the Creek makes its television premiere on Cartoon Network after being released exclusively for Digital services last month.
- January 16: The Twisted Timeline of Sammy & Raj premiered on Nicktoons in the United States.
- January 18: The first four episodes of Vivienne Medrano's independent adult animated series Hazbin Hotel premiered on Prime Video.
- January 25:
  - Masters of the Universe: Revolution premiered on Netflix.
  - Episodes 5 and 6 of Hazbin Hotel was released on Amazon Prime Video.

=== February ===
- February 1:
  - Episodes 7 and 8 of Hazbin Hotel was released on Prime Video.
  - Season 3 of Clone High premiered on Max.
- February 2:
  - DreamWorks Animation's Orion and the Dark film was released as a Netflix-exclusive.
  - Paramount Animation's The Tiger's Apprentice premiered on Paramount+.
  - The second season of Moon Girl and Devil Dinosaur premiered on Disney Channel.
  - First of six half-hour Care Bears: Unlock the Magic specials, "The Quest for the Rainbow Stone", premiered on Max, which was followed by its American broadcast on Boomerang in the United States the next day on February 3.
- February 5: Lyla in the Loop premiered on PBS Kids.
- February 7: Disney's Bob Iger announced in a CNBC interview before the studio's Q1 earnings that the studio was turning a planned Moana television series into a feature sequel for theatrical release in November.
- February 9: Disney and Pixar's Turning Red was released in theaters, after being a stream-exclusive on Disney+ on March 11, 2022, due to the COVID-19 pandemic.
- February 12:
  - The SpongeBob SquarePants, special episode, titled "Squidiot Box", premiered on Nickelodeon, it was the first of a series of special episodes released to celebrate the series' 25th anniversary.
  - Rock Paper Scissors premiered on Nickelodeon.
- February 14: The first episode of MechWest, "Where the West Begins, Part 1", was released on YouTube.
- February 17: The 51st Annie Awards were held.
- February 21: The final season of Star Wars: The Bad Batch premiered on Disney+.
- February 23:
  - The Second Best Hospital in the Galaxy premiered on Prime Video.
  - Glitch Productions officially greenlights The Amazing Digital Circus for a full series.
- February 28: Streaming television series Iwájú, which is a collaboration between Walt Disney Animation Studios and Kugali Media, premiered on Disney+.

=== March ===
- March 1:
  - Doraemon: Nobita's Earth Symphony, the 43rd film in the Doraemon franchise, was released in Japanese cinemas by Toho. It serves as a special project to honor deceased manga artists Hiroshi Fujimoto and Motoo Abiko of Fujiko Fujio.
  - Megamind vs. the Doom Syndicate premiered on Peacock.
- March 4: Mattel Television's Hot Wheels Let's Race premiered on Netflix.
- March 7: The first batch of English-dubbed episodes of Pokémon Horizons: The Series premiered on Netflix in the United States, almost eleven months after its Japanese television release on April 14, 2023.
- March 8:
  - DreamWorks Animation's Kung Fu Panda 4 was released.
  - The second of six half-hour Care Bears: Unlock the Magic specials, "Grumpy's Ginormous Adventure", premiered on Max, which was followed by its American broadcast on Boomerang in the United States the next day on March 9.
  - Season 2 of Tiny Toons Looniversity premiered on Max.
- March 10:
  - 96th Academy Awards:
    - Studio Ghibli's The Boy and the Heron directed by Hayao Miyazaki wins Best Animated Feature, making it the first 2-D animated film to win since Miyazaki's own Spirited Away in 2003.
    - War Is Over! Inspired by the Music of John and Yoko directed by Dave Mullins wins Best Animated Short Film.
  - Nintendo and Illumination announced that a sequel to The Super Mario Bros. Movie is in production as part of Mario Day celebrations.
- March 15: The season 17 finale episode of Upin & Ipin premiered on TV2, Astro Ceria, Astro Prima and MNCTV.
- March 20: X-Men '97 premiered on Disney+.
- March 22:
  - The Casagrandes Movie premiered on Netflix.
  - Disney and Pixar's Luca was released in theaters, after being a stream-exclusive on Disney+ on June 18, 2021, due to the COVID-19 pandemic.
- March 25: The ninth season of Gabby's Dollhouse premiered on Netflix.
- March 28: Among ten titles, Blue's Clues & You!, Big Nate and Rugrats (2021) were removed from Paramount+.
- March 29: The seventh and penultimate episode of Murder Drones, titled "Mass Destruction", was released on YouTube on the GLITCH channel.

=== April ===
- April 1:
  - The second season of Smiling Friends premiered on Adult Swim.
  - WildBrain's The third computer-animated Strawberry Shortcake: Berry in the Big City Spring special Strawberry Shortcake's Spring Spectacular premiered on Netflix.
- April 4: The second season of Ninjago: Dragons Rising premiered on Netflix.
- April 5:
  - Anime series adaptation of Wind Breaker premiered on Japanese television.
  - The second season of SuperKitties premiered on Disney Junior and Disney Channel in the United States.
  - The second season of Monsters at Work premiered on Disney Channel in the United States, followed by its Disney+ premiere a month later on May 5.
- April 6: The series finale of Strawberry Shortcake: Berry in the Big City premiered on YouTube.
- April 12:
  - The live-action/animated Woody Woodpecker sequel film Woody Woodpecker Goes to Camp premiered on Netflix.
  - Dora, a reboot series of Dora the Explorer, premiered on Paramount+.
- April 17: Family Guy 22nd season finale, titled "Faith No More", premiered on Fox.
- April 21: The third-season finale of Bluey, titled "Surprise!", premiered on both ABC Kids and Disney+.
- April 25: Season 2 of Velma premiered on Max.
- April 26:
  - The live-action/animated Sonic the Hedgehog spin-off television series, Knuckles, premiered on Paramount+.
  - The first Helluva Boss short, titled "Hell's Belles", was released on YouTube.
  - DreamWorks announced a feature-length adaptation of the Netflix series Gabby's Dollhouse to be released in 2025, as one of their first live action hybrid films.

=== May ===
- May 1: The series finale episode of Star Wars: The Bad Batch premiered on Disney+.
- May 3: The second episode of The Amazing Digital Circus, titled "Candy Carrier Chaos!", was released on YouTube on the GLITCH channel.
- May 4: The second season of Star Wars: Tales premiered on Disney+.
- May 9: Season 2 of Powerhouse Animation's Blood of Zeus premiered on Netflix.
- May 10: The second batch of English-dubbed episodes of Pokémon Horizons: The Series premiered on Netflix in the United States.
- May 15:
  - The season finale of X-Men '97 premiered on Disney+.
  - Episodes 6–9 from Season 4 of Big City Greens were released on Disney+.
- May 17:
  - Tom Kenny reveals that his well-known character SpongeBob SquarePants is canonically Autistic.
  - Jared Hess and Lynn Wang's musical film adaptation of Aaron Blabey's children's book series Thelma the Unicorn premiered on Netflix.
- May 18: Hailey's On It! airs its final episode on Disney Channel.
- May 19: The 35th season finale of The Simpsons, titled "Bart's Brain", premiered on Fox.
- May 20: The Fairly OddParents: A New Wish, the sequel series to The Fairly OddParents, premiered on Nickelodeon.
- May 21:
  - Angry Birds Mystery Island premiered on Prime Video.
  - It was reported that 175 members of Pixar's workforce were laid off by The Walt Disney Company as part of the company's reconstruction.
- May 24:
  - Columbia Pictures and Alcon Entertainment's The Garfield Movie was released.
  - South Park: The End of Obesity premiered on Paramount+.
- May 26: The second season of My Adventures with Superman premiered on Adult Swim.
- May 29: Japanese anime studio Gainax (Neon Genesis Evangelion), files for bankruptcy.
- May 31:
  - The second part of the first season of the Max original series Scavengers Reign premiered on Netflix in the United States, following its cancellation at Max.
  - The eighth episode in Season 2 of Helluva Boss, titled "The Full Moon", premiered on YouTube.

=== June ===
- June 1:
  - The sixth and final season of Craig of the Creek begins on Cartoon Network with the premiere of the episode "Rise and Shine". The season's premiere was seen by a total of 119 thousand viewers that morning.
  - WildBrain's The fourth and final computer-animated Strawberry Shortcake: Berry in the Big City last special Strawberry Shortcake's Summer Vacation will premiere on Netflix.
- June 6:
  - Feature film Big City Greens the Movie: Spacecation premiered on Disney Channel in the United States, followed by its Disney+ release the next day on June 7.
  - The Loud House concludes its seventh season on Nickelodeon with the episode "Love Me Tenor".
- June 10: Season 8 of The Loud House begins on Nickelodeon with the premiere of the episode "Homeward Bound".
- June 14:
  - Pixar's Inside Out 2 was released.
  - Camp Snoopy premiered on Apple TV+.
  - Ultraman: Rising premiered on Netflix.
- June 15: Paw Patrol concludes its tenth season on TVO in Canada with the episodes "Rescue Wheels: Pups vs. the Monster Mayor".
- June 21: No Time to Spy: A Loud House Movie premiered on both Nickelodeon and Paramount+ in the United States.
- June 22:
  - The ninth episode in Season 2 of Helluva Boss, titled "Apology Tour", premiered on YouTube.
- June 25: MeTV Toons, a new 24-hour network devoted to classic cartoons was launched.
- June 27:
  - The first three episodes of Suicide Squad Isekai premiered simultaneously on Hulu and Max in the United States.
  - Ariel premiered on Disney Junior.
- June 28:
  - Skydance Animation's WondLa premiered on Apple TV+.
  - Zombies: The Re-Animated Series premiered on Disney Channel.

=== July ===
- July 3: Illumination's Despicable Me 4 was released.
- July 5: The third of six half-hour Care Bears: Unlock the Magic specials, "The Star of a Thousand Wishes", premiered on Max.
- July 6: Season 11 of Paw Patrol begins on TVO in Canada with the episodes "Rescue Wheels: Pups Save the Teetering Tower/Rescue Wheels: Pups Save the Spelunkers".
- July 10: The second and final season of Kamp Koral: SpongeBob's Under Years premiered on Paramount+, before airing on Nickelodeon the next year.
- July 11: Sausage Party: Foodtopia premiered on Amazon Prime Video.
- July 12: Television series adaptation of The Oatmeal's Exploding Kittens tabletop card game premiered on Netflix.
- July 15: The second season of Hit-Monkey premiered on Hulu.
- July 16: The 300th episode of SpongeBob SquarePants, titled "In the Mood to Feud", premiered on Nickelodeon as part of a series of special episodes to celebrate the series' 25th anniversary.
- July 17: SpongeBob SquarePants celebrated its 25th anniversary with an episode titled "Mooned!", which premiered on Nickelodeon. It aired exactly 25 years after the official series premiere in 1999.
- July 18: SpongeBob SquarePants celebrated its 25th anniversary with a special episode titled "Hysterical History", premiered on Nickelodeon as part of a series of special episodes to celebrate the series' 25th anniversary.
- July 24: The fifteenth season of SpongeBob SquarePants premiered on Nickelodeon.
- July 25: Primos premiered on Disney Channel, followed by its Disney+ release the next day on July 26.
- July 26: Hazbin Hotel got renewed for a third & fourth season by Amazon.
- July 29: Season 9 of Futurama premiered on Hulu.
- July 31: The second Helluva Boss short, titled "Mission: Antarctica", was released on YouTube.

=== August ===
- August 1: Batman: Caped Crusader premiered on Amazon Prime.
- August 2: Saving Bikini Bottom: The Sandy Cheeks Movie premiered on Netflix.
- August 5: The tenth season of Gabby's Dollhouse premiered on Netflix.
- August 8: Cartoon Network's website CartoonNetwork.com gets shut down (as the link for the website now redirects users to HBO Max).
- August 9:
  - Tales of the Teenage Mutant Ninja Turtles premiered on Paramount+.
  - At Disney's D23 exposition, Pixar announced a new original film Hoppers for 2026, and announced that a third The Incredibles film was in the works with Brad Bird directing. On the television side, Pixar also formally announced an Inside Out spin-off, Dream Productions for Disney+ for 2025.
  - Warner Bros. Pictures leaves production of Sony Pictures Animation's Fixed.
- August 22:
  - Iginio Straffi's Mermaid Magic series premiered on Netflix.
- August 23: The eighth and final episode of Murder Drones, titled "Absolute End", was released on YouTube on the GLITCH channel.
- August 29: Skydance and Production I.G's anime series, Terminator Zero, premiered on Netflix.
- August 31: The third Helluva Boss short, "Mission: Weeaboo-Boo", was released on YouTube.

=== September ===
- September 1: The fourth of six half-hour Care Bears: Unlock the Magic specials, "The Bad Crowd Strikes Back!", premiered on Max.
- September 14: The second and final season of Hamster & Gretel premiered simultaneously on Disney Channel and Disney XD.
- September 15: The Great North fourth season finale, titled "Am I the Ice Hole? Adventure", premiered on Fox.
- September 17: Paw Patrol concludes its tenth season on Nickelodeon in the US with the episodes "Rescue Wheels: Pups vs. the Monster Mayor".
- September 18:
  - Season 11 of Paw Patrol begins on Nickelodeon in the US with the episodes "Rescue Wheels: Pups Save the Teetering Tower/Rescue Wheels: Pups Save the Spelunkers".
  - The first 8 episodes from Season 2 of Hamster & Gretel released on Disney+, with episodes 3–8 being released before premiering on Disney Channel.
- September 19: Zack Snyder's Twilight of the Gods series premiered on Netflix.
- September 20: Paramount Animation's Transformers One was released.
- September 22: Bob's Burgers 14th season finale, titled "To Catch a Beef", premiered on Fox.
- September 27: DreamWorks Animation's The Wild Robot was released.
- September 29:
  - The fourth Helluva Boss short, titled "Mission: Chupacabras", was released on YouTube.
  - Season 36 of The Simpsons premiered on Fox with the episode "Bart's Birthday", guest starring the following actors: John Cena, Joel McHale, Mark Proksch, Seth Rogen, and Amy Sedaris; also featuring returning guest stars such as Danny DeVito and Tom Hanks.
  - Season 15 of Bob's Burgers premiered on Fox with the episode "The Tina Table: The Tables Have Tina-ed".
- September 30:
  - Boomerang shuts down its streaming service with its programming being moved to Max.
  - Futurama concludes its ninth season on Hulu.

=== October ===
- October 3:
  - DreamWorks Animation Television's The Bad Guys: Haunted Heist premiered on Netflix.
  - Season 2 of Gremlins: Secrets of the Mogwai (now subtitled "The Wild Batch") premiered on Max.
  - The final episode of Velma premieres on Max.
- October 4:
  - The final season of Star Trek: Lower Decks premieres on Paramount+.
  - Science Saru's anime series adaptation of Yukinobu Tatsu's "Dan Da Dan" premiered on Netflix globally.
  - The fifth of six half-hour Care Bears: Unlock the Magic specials, "The Mystery of the Snickering Ghost", premiered on Max.
  - The third episode of The Amazing Digital Circus, titled "The Mystery of Mildenhall Manor", was released on YouTube (on the GLITCH channel) and Netflix along with the second and first episodes.
- October 5: The second Halloween special of Kiff, titled "The Haunting of Miss McGravy's House", premiered on Disney Channel.
- October 6: MAPPA's anime series adaptation of Rumiko Takahashi's Ranma ½ premiered on Japanese television, which was followed by its immediate Netflix debut shortly after.
- October 10:
  - Legendary Television's Tomb Raider: The Legend of Lara Croft premiered on Netflix.
  - The SpongeBob SquarePants hour-long Halloween special, titled "Kreepaway Kamp", premiered on both Nickelodeon and Paramount+.
- October 11:
  - Dragon Ball Daima premiered.
  - Focus Features and Universal Pictures animated documentary Piece by Piece, a biography-film about Pharrell Williams told through Lego, was released.
- October 14:
  - The second season of Pupstruction premiered on Disney Jr. in the United States.
  - The Family Guy Halloween special, titled "Peter, Peter, Pumpkin Cheater", was released as a Hulu exclusive.
  - DreamWorks Animation Television's Mighty MonsterWheelies premiered on Netflix.
- October 16: Sing: Thriller, a Halloween short film based on Illumination's Sing franchise, was released on Netflix.
- October 28: Season 21 of American Dad! lremiered on TBS with the episode "The Grocery Store Bank". The season's premiere watched by only 230,000 viewers that night, marking another low in the show's viewership.
- October 30: Max & the Midknights premiered on Nickelodeon.
- October 31: The tenth episode in Season 2 of Helluva Boss, titled "Ghostf**kers", premiered on YouTube.

=== November ===
- November 1: The sixth and final half-hour Care Bears: Unlock the Magic special, "The No Heart Games", premiered on Max.
- November 9: Episodes 1-3 of the second and final season of Arcane premiered on Netflix as part of Act I.
- November 11: The SpongeBob SquarePants half-hour special episode, titled "Snow Yellow", premiered on Nickelodeon. It is a parody of the 1937 Disney fairytale feature film Snow White and the Seven Dwarfs.
- November 14: Carl the Collector premiered on PBS Kids.
- November 16: Episodes 4-6 of the final season of Arcane premiered on Netflix as part of Act II.
- November 20:
  - Pamela Hayden, American actress who voiced Milhouse Van Houten, Jimbo Jones and more, retired from The Simpsons after 35 years.
- November 22: Skydance Animation's second feature film Spellbound premiered on Netflix.
- November 23: Episodes 7-9 of the final season of Arcane premiered on Netflix as part of Act III, concluding the series.
- November 25: Season 4 of The Creature Cases was released on Netflix.
- November 27: Walt Disney Animation Studios' Moana 2 was released.
- November 29: The eleventh episode in Season 2 of Helluva Boss, titled "Mastermind", premiered on YouTube.
- November 30: The 400th episode and eighth-season finale of Teen Titans Go! premieres on Cartoon Network.

=== December ===
- December 1: Almost all of Netflix's interactive titles were removed.
- December 2: The SpongeBob SquarePants half-hour stop motion Christmas special titled "Sandy's Country Christmas", premieres on both Nickelodeon and Paramount+, it also served as the fourteenth season finale of the series.
- December 4: Locksmith Animation's second feature film That Christmas premiered on Netflix.
- December 5:
  - Titmouse's Jentry Chau vs. the Underworld premiered on Netflix.
  - DC Studios's Creature Commandos premiered on Max.
  - Part 1 of the third and final season of Beastars premiered on Netflix.
- December 7: Zombies: The Re-Animated Series concludes its first season on Disney Channel and Disney XD simultaneously with the Christmas special "Santler Claws is Comin' to Town".
- December 10: Secret Level premiered on Amazon Prime Video.
- December 11: Pixar's Dream Productions, a series spin-off of the Inside Out film franchise, premieres on Disney+.
- December 13:
  - The animated feature-length Lord of the Rings film, The War of the Rohirrim, from Warner Bros. Pictures, was released.
  - The fourth episode of The Amazing Digital Circus, titled "Fast Food Masquerade", was released on YouTube (on the GLITCH channel) and Netflix.
- December 17:
  - Fleischer Studios' KoKo's Earth Control is added to the National Film Registry.
  - It was reported that a character's storyline in a then-upcoming Pixar series Win or Lose had been altered so that the character in question would no longer be transgender, even though Pixar had originally described the character as transgender, and cast a transgender girl to voice the role. Subsequent follow-up by The Hollywood Reporter revealed that the episode had already originally been finished with the transgender storyline, requiring added expense to alter the episode, and that Pixar had also been asked to downplay the environmentalism themes of their upcoming film Hoppers.
- December 19:
  - The final episode of Star Trek: Lower Decks premiered on Paramount+.
  - Several Nickelodeon shows including Doug, My Life as a Teenage Robot, Kung Fu Panda: Legends of Awesomeness, The Penguins of Madagascar, Alvinnn!!! and the Chipmunks and many others were removed from Paramount+.
- December 20:
  - The live-action/animated film Sonic the Hedgehog 3 from Paramount Pictures was released.
  - Mufasa: The Lion King from Walt Disney Studios was released.
- December 21: Season 2 finale of Vivienne Medrano's independent webseries Helluva Boss, titled "Sinsmas", was released on YouTube.
- December 22:
  - The final season of What If...? premiered on Disney+.
  - The 5th & final season of The Great North begins on Fox with the premiere of the episode "The Lies Aquatic Adventure".
- December 25: Wallace & Gromit: Vengeance Most Fowl premieres on BBC One and BBC iPlayer in the United Kingdom before its premiere on Netflix internationally on January 3, 2025.

== Awards ==
- Academy Award for Best Animated Feature: The Boy and the Heron
- Academy Award for Best Animated Short Film: War Is Over!
- American Cinema Editors Award for Best Edited Animated Feature Film: Spider-Man: Across the Spider-Verse
- Annecy International Animated Film Festival Cristal du long métrage: Memoir of a Snail
- Annie Award for Best Animated Feature: Spider-Man: Across the Spider-Verse
- Annie Award for Best Animated Feature — Independent: Robot Dreams
- Annie Award for Best Animated Television Production: Blue Eye Samurai
- Astra Film Award for Best Animated Film: Spider-Man: Across the Spider-Verse
- Austin Film Critics Association Award for Best Animated Film: Spider-Man: Across the Spider-Verse
- BAFTA Award for Best Animated Film: The Boy and the Heron
- BAFTA Award for Best Short Animation: Crab Day
- Boston Society of Film Critics Award for Best Animated Film: The Boy and the Heron
- Central Ohio Film Critics Association Awards for Best Animated Feature: Nimona
- César Award for Best Animated Film: Chicken for Linda!
- Chicago Film Critics Association Award for Best Animated Film: The Boy and the Heron
- Critics' Choice Movie Award for Best Animated Feature: Spider-Man: Across the Spider-Verse
- Critics' Choice Television Award for Best Animated Series: Scott Pilgrim Takes Off
- Dallas–Fort Worth Film Critics Association Award for Best Animated Film: The Boy and the Heron
- European Film Award for Best Animated Feature Film: Robot Dreams
- Florida Film Critics Circle Award for Best Animated Film: The Boy and the Heron
- Golden Globe Award for Best Animated Feature Film: The Boy and the Heron
- Golden Reel Award for Outstanding Achievement in Sound Editing – Sound Effects, Foley, Dialogue and ADR for Animated Feature Film: Spider-Man: Across the Spider-Verse
- Goya Award for Best Animated Film: Robot Dreams
- Japan Academy Film Prize for Animation of the Year: The Boy and the Heron
- Kids' Choice Award for Favorite Animated Movie: Spider-Man: Across the Spider-Verse
- Los Angeles Film Critics Association Award for Best Animated Film: The Boy and the Heron
- Mainichi Film Award for Best Animation Film: Maboroshi
- Minnesota Film Critics Alliance Award for Best Animated Feature: Spider-Man: Across the Spider-Verse
- NAACP Image Award for Outstanding Animated Motion Picture: Spider-Man: Across the Spider-Verse
- National Board of Review Award for Best Animated Film: Spider-Man: Across the Spider-Verse
- New York Film Critics Circle Award for Best Animated Film: The Boy and the Heron
- Online Film Critics Society Award for Best Animated Film: Spider-Man: Across the Spider-Verse
- Producers Guild of America Award for Best Animated Motion Picture: Spider-Man: Across the Spider-Verse
- San Diego Film Critics Society Award for Best Animated Film: The Boy and the Heron
- San Francisco Film Critics Circle Award for Best Animated Feature: The Boy and the Heron
- Saturn Award for Best Animated Film: Spider-Man: Across the Spider-Verse
- Seattle Film Critics Society Award for Best Animated Feature: Spider-Man: Across the Spider-Verse
- St. Louis Gateway Film Critics Association Award for Best Animated Film: Spider-Man: Across the Spider-Verse
- Tokyo Anime Award: The First Slam Dunk
- Toronto Film Critics Association Award for Best Animated Film: Robot Dreams
- Visual Effects Society Award for Outstanding Visual Effects in an Animated Feature: Spider-Man: Across the Spider-Verse
- Washington D.C. Area Film Critics Association Award for Best Animated Feature: Spider-Man: Across the Spider-Verse

== Films released ==
- March 8 - Kung Fu Panda 4 (United States)
- May 3 - Super Wings: Maximum Speed (United Kingdom)
- May 24 - The Garfield Movie (United States)
- June 14 - Inside Out 2 (United States)
- June 21 - No Time to Spy: A Loud House Movie (United States)
- July 3 - Despicable Me 4 (United States)
- November 27 - Moana 2 (United States)
- December 20 - Sonic the Hedgehog 3 (United States)

== Television series debuts ==
Date	Title	Channel, Streaming	Year
January 4	Delicious in Dungeon	Netflix	2024–present
January 6	A Sign of Affection	Tokyo MX, Crunchyroll	2024
January 7	Grimsburg	Fox	2024–present
January 7	Solo Leveling	Tokyo MX, Crunchyroll	2024–present
January 16	The Twisted Timeline of Sammy & Raj	Nicktoons	2024
January 18	Hazbin Hotel	Amazon Prime	2024–present
January 25	In the Know	Peacock	2024
January 25	Masters of the Universe: Revolution	Netflix	2024
January 26	Windy Weatherfoot	YouTube	2024–present
February 5	Dee & Friends in Oz	Netflix	2024
February 5	Lyla in the Loop	PBS Kids	2024–present
February 11	Rock Paper Scissors	Nickelodeon	2024–2026
February 14	MechWest	YouTube	2024–present
February 15	Bea's Block	Max	2024–present
February 15	Caillou	Peacock	2024
February 23	The Second Best Hospital in the Galaxy	Amazon Prime	2024–present
February 28	Iwájú	Disney+	2024
March 1	Megamind Rules!	Peacock	2024
March 4	Hot Wheels Let's Race	Netflix	2024–2025
March 20	Morphle and the Magic Pets	Disney Junior	2024–2025
March 20	X-Men '97	Disney+	2024–present
March 21	Ark: The Animated Series	Paramount+	2024–present
March 28	Bad Dinosaurs	Netflix	2024
April 4	Hop	Max	2024–present
April 5	Wind Breaker	JNN, Crunchyroll	2024-present
April 6	Girls Band Cry	Tokyo MX, Amazon Prime	2024
April 12	Dora	Paramount+	2024–present
April 12	Good Times	Netflix	2024
April 13	Kaiju No. 8	TV Tokyo, Crunchyroll	2024-present
April 26	Knuckles	Paramount+	2024
May 12	Mr. Birchum	DailyWire+	2024
May 20	The Fairly OddParents: A New Wish	Nickelodeon	2024
May 21	Angry Birds Mystery Island	Amazon Prime	2024
May 24	Jurassic World: Chaos Theory	Netflix	2024–2025
June 14	Camp Snoopy	Apple TV+	2024–present
June 26	Ariel	Disney Junior	2024–present
June 27	Suicide Squad Isekai	Hulu, Max (United States)	2024
June 28	WondLa	Apple TV+	2024–2025
June 28	Zombies: The Re-Animated Series	Disney Channel	2024
July 6	The Elusive Samurai	Tokyo MX, Crunchyroll	2024-2026
July 11	Sausage Party: Foodtopia	Amazon Prime	2024–present
July 12	Exploding Kittens	Netflix	2024
July 13	Makeine: Too Many Losing Heroines!	Tokyo MX, Crunchyroll	2024–present
July 18	Kite Man: Hell Yeah!	Max	2024
July 25	Primos	Disney Channel	2024–2025
August 1	Batman: Caped Crusader	Amazon Prime	2024–present
August 9	Tales of the Teenage Mutant Ninja Turtles	Paramount+	2024–2025
August 15	Rick and Morty: The Anime	Adult Swim	2024
August 22	Mermaid Magic	Netflix	2024
August 29	Terminator Zero	Netflix	2024
September 3	Kindergarten: The Musical	Disney Jr.	2024–2025
September 8	Universal Basic Guy	Fox	2024–present
September 19	Twilight of the Gods	Netflix	2024
September 25	Everybody Still Hates Chris	Comedy Central	2024–present
September 26	Tea Town Teddy Bears	Peacock	2024–present
October 3	Blue Box	Netflix	2024–present
October 4	Dan Da Dan	Netflix	2024–present
October 5	Orb: On the Movements of the Earth	Netflix	2024–2025
October 6	Ranma ½	Netflix	2024–present
October 10	Tomb Raider: The Legend of Lara Croft	Netflix	2024–2025
October 14	Barney's World	Max	2024–2025
October 14	Mighty MonsterWheelies	Netflix	2024–2025
October 30	Max & the Midnknights	Nickelodeon	2024–2026
November 2	Invincible Fight Girl	Adult Swim	2024–present
November 14	Carl the Collector	PBS Kids	2024–present
November 21	Press Start!	Peacock	2024–present
November 21	Tokyo Overdrive	Netflix	2024–present
December 5	Creature Commandos	Max	2024–present
December 5	Jentry Chau vs. the Underworld	Netflix	2024
December 10	Secret Level	Amazon Prime	2024–present
December 11	Dream Productions	Disney+	2024
December 13	Wonder Pets: In The City	Apple TV+	2024

== Television series endings ==
Date	Title	Channel, Streaming	Year	Notes
January 2	Nature Cat	PBS Kids	2015–2024	Ended
January 11	Sonic Prime	Netflix	2022–2024	Ended
January 13	The Ghost and Molly McGee	Disney Channel, Disney+	2021–2024	Ended
January 25	In the Know	Peacock	2024	Cancelled
February 1	Clone High (2023)	Max	2023–2024	Cancelled
February 5	Dee & Friends in Oz	Netflix	2024	Ended
February 29	Bossy Bear	Nickelodeon, Nick Jr.	2023–2024	Ended
April 4	Hello Kitty: Super Style!	Amazon Kids+	2022–2024	Ended
April 6	Strawberry Shortcake: Berry in the Big City	YouTube, Family Jr.	2021–2024	Cancelled
April 14	Total Drama Island	Cartoon Network, Max	2023–2024	Cancelled
April 15	Alice's Wonderland Bakery	Disney Junior, Disney+	2022–2024	Ended
April 15	PJ Masks	Disney Junior (United States); France 3 (France)	2015–2024	Cancelled
April 18	Barbie: A Touch of Magic	Netflix	2023–2024	Ended
April 21	Bluey	ABC Kids (Australia); Disney Junior (United States)	2018–2024	Ended
May 1	Star Wars: The Bad Batch	Disney+	2021–2024	Cancelled
May 18	Hailey's On It!	Disney Channel	2023–2024	Cancelled
May 31	Jessica's Big Little World	Cartoon Network	2023–2024	Cancelled
July 10	Kamp Koral: SpongeBob's Under Years	Paramount+/Nickelodeon	2021–2024	Ended
August 8	The Fairly OddParents: A New Wish	Nickelodeon	2024	Cancelled
August 23	Murder Drones	YouTube	2021–2024	Ended
September 27	Blue's Clues & You!	Nickelodeon	2019–2024	Cancelled
October 3	Velma	Max	2023–2024	Cancelled
October 17	My Little Pony: Tell Your Tale	YouTube	2022-2024	Cancelled
October 24	Monster High	Nickelodeon	2022–2024	Ended
November 2	Care Bears: Unlock the Magic	Cartoon Network, Cartoonito/Max	2019–2024	Ended
November 23	Arcane	Netflix	2021–2024	Ended
December 3	Angry Birds Mystery Island	Amazon Kids+, Amazon	2024	Ended
December 19	Star Trek: Lower Decks	Paramount+	2020–2024	Ended
December 19	The Dragon Prince	Netflix	2018–2024	Ended
December 29	What If...?	Disney+	2021–2024	Ended

== Television season premieres ==
Date	Title	Season	Channel, Streaming
January 7	The Great North	4	Fox
January 11	Sonic Prime	3	Netflix
February 2–3	Moon Girl and Devil Dinosaur	2	Disney Channel, Disney XD, Disney+
February 22	Jellystone!	3	Max
March 8	Tiny Toons Looniversity	2	Max
April 1	Smiling Friends	2	Cartoon Network (Adult Swim block)
June 1	Craig of the Creek	6	Cartoon Network
June 10	The Loud House	8	Nickelodeon
July 6	Paw Patrol	11	TVO (Note: Season later premiered in the US on Nickelodeon on September 18th.)
July 10	Kamp Koral: SpongeBob's Under Years	2	Paramount+
July 24	SpongeBob SquarePants	15	Nickelodeon
July 29	Futurama	9	Hulu
July 29	The Patrick Star Show	3	Nickelodeon
September 14–18	Hamster & Gretel	2	Disney Channel, Disney XD, Disney+
September 29	Krapopolis	2	Fox
September 29	Bob's Burgers	15	Fox
September 29	The Simpsons	36	Fox
October 14	Family Guy	23	Hulu (Note: The season initially premiered on Hulu with two exclusive holidays specials, it made its official premiere on Fox on February 16, 2025)
October 28	American Dad!	21	TBS
December 22	The Great North	5	Fox

== Television season finales ==
Date	Title	Season	Channel, Streaming
February 2	Hazbin Hotel	1	Prime Video
February 10	Kiff	1	Disney Channel, Disney XD
April 17	Family Guy	22	Fox
May 12	Grimsburg	1	Fox
May 19	Krapopolis	1	Fox
May 19	The Simpsons	35	Fox
June 6	The Loud House	7	Nickelodeon
June 15	Paw Patrol	10	TVO (Note: Season later premiered in the US on Nickelodeon on September 17th.)
June 24	Smiling Friends	2	Adult Swim (Cartoon Network)
July 25	The Patrick Star Show	2	Nickelodeon
August 3	Chibiverse	2	Disney Channel, Disney XD
August 8	The Fairly OddParents: A New Wish	1	Nickelodeon
September 15	The Great North	4	Fox
September 22	Bob's Burgers	14	Fox
September 30	Futurama	9	Hulu
November 27	Rock Paper Scissors	1	Nickelodeon
November 30	Teen Titans Go!	8	Cartoon Network
December 2	SpongeBob SquarePants	14	Nickelodeon
December 7	Zombies: The Re-Animated Series	1	Disney Channel, Disney XD
December 21	Helluva Boss	2	YouTube

== Deaths ==
=== January ===
- January 2: William Samples, American actor (voice of Tantalus in Class of the Titans, Charles Greyson in Sherlock Holmes in the 22nd Century, Samuel Tillinghast in Project ARMS, Professor Flintheart in the My Little Pony: Friendship is Magic episode "A Hearth's Warming Tail"), dies at age 71.
- January 3: Germana Dominici, Italian actress (Italian dub voice of Georgette in Oliver & Company, Mrs. Beakley in DuckTales and DuckTales the Movie: Treasure of the Lost Lamp, Eema in Dinosaur), dies at age 77.
- January 4: Glynis Johns, British actress (portrayed Winifred Banks in Mary Poppins, voice of Mrs. Grimwood in Scooby-Doo and the Ghoul School, Swallow in The Happy Prince, Darjeeling in the ABC Weekend Special The Secret Garden), dies at age 100.
- January 5: Brian McConnachie, American actor and writer (The Simpsons episode "The Fabulous Faker Boy", Noddy, the HBO Storybook Musicals episode "Earthday Birthday"), dies at age 81.
- January 8: Gene Merlino, American singer and musician (choir performer in Charlotte's Web and Heidi's Song, performed songs "South of the Border", "Born Free" and "Jellyfish" in The Simpsons, additional voices in The Little Mermaid), dies at age 95.
- January 11: Laurence Badie, French actress (French dub voice of Velma Dinkley in the Scooby-Doo franchise), dies at age 95.
- January 12: Haruo Takahashi, Japanese animator (Tiger Mask, Silver Fang, Inspector Gadget), dies at age 76.
- January 14: Mo Henry, American film negative cutter (Thumbelina, Aladdin and the King of Thieves, Space Jam, Anastasia, Quest for Camelot, Rudolph the Red-Nosed Reindeer: The Movie, The Prince of Egypt, The Iron Giant, The Road to El Dorado, Titan A.E., Shrek franchise, Osmosis Jones, Spirit: Stallion of the Cimarron, Looney Tunes: Back in Action, Shark Tale, The Polar Express, Madagascar franchise, Hoodwinked!, Over the Hedge, The Ant Bully, Bee Movie, Kung Fu Panda, Strange Magic, Ice Age: Collision Course), dies at age 67.
- January 15: Reid Harrison, American television producer and writer (Duckman, The Simpsons, Warner Bros. Animation, The PJs, Drawn Together, Catscratch, Celebrity Deathmatch, George of the Jungle, Tak and the Power of Juju, Alvinnn!!! and the Chipmunks, Danger Mouse, Sonic Boom, Counterfeit Cat, Angelo Rules, Disenchantment, The Smurfs), dies at age 65.
- January 16: Laurie Johnson, English composer (The Ren & Stimpy Show, SpongeBob SquarePants), dies at age 96.
- January 17: Ulrich Voß, German actor (German dub voice of Sergeant Cosgrove in Freakazoid!), dies at age 85.
- January 22: Dexter King, American civil rights activist (voice of Martin Luther King, Jr. at age 34 in Our Friend, Martin), dies at age 62.
- January 23: Charles Osgood, American news anchor (voice of the Narrator in Horton Hears a Who!), dies at age 91.
- January 30:
  - Chita Rivera, American actress (voice of the Witch in Dora the Explorer episodes "Dora's Fairytale Adventure" and "Dora Saves Fairytale Land", Katy in the Happily Ever After: Fairy Tales for Every Child episode "Thumbelina"), dies at age 91.
  - Hinton Battle, American actor (provided additional voices for The Spooktacular New Adventures of Casper), dies at age 67.

=== February ===
- February 1:
  - Greg Finley, American voice actor (voice of Captain Gloval and Anatole Leonard in the Robotech franchise, provided additional voices for Oliver & Company, Bebe's Kids, Dinosaur, Final Fantasy: The Spirits Within, Garfield's Pet Force, The Loud House Movie), dies at age 76.
  - Mark Gustafson, American animator (Meet the Raisins!, Claymation Easter, The PJs, Fantastic Mr. Fox, Guillermo del Toro's Pinocchio), dies from a heart attack at age 64.
  - Carl Weathers, American actor, director and former football linebacker (voice of GNC Water Bottle in Eight Crazy Nights, Kirby in Balto III: Wings of Change, Basketball King and God of Basketball in Regular Show, Combat Carl in the Toy Story franchise, Omnitraxus Prime in Star vs. the Forces of Evil), dies at age 76.
- February 2: Claudio Rissi, Argentine actor (voice of Sargento Cruz in Fierro), dies at age 67.
- February 6: Tommy Karlsen Sandum, Norwegian actor (Norwegian dub voice of Shrek and Pinocchio in the Shrek franchise, Wildmutt in the Ben 10 franchise, Eddy in Ed, Edd n Eddy, Armando in Rio, General Gato and General Mono in TMNT), dies at age 48.
- February 8: Bon Ishihara, Japanese voice actor (voice of the Gold-toothed Doctor in Fullmetal Alchemist: Brotherhood, Johnny the Matagi in Samurai Champloo, Sōichirō Shimogamo in The Eccentric Family, Alexandre Bucock in Legend of the Galactic Heroes: Die Neue These, and Kenichi Yamamoto in Shingu: Secret of the Stellar Wars), dies at age 68.
- February 12: Tamás Deák, Hungarian composer and conductor (Cat City), dies at age 95.
- February 13: Alain Dorval, French voice actor (French dub voice of Pete in the Mickey Mouse franchise, Weaver in Antz, Tiger in the American Tail franchise, Victor in Ratchet & Clank, Lex Luthor in Superman: The Animated Series, Sylvester Stallone in Solar Opposites, voice of Goliath the Rhino in The Jungle Bunch), dies at age 77.
- February 15: Anne Whitfield, American actress (voice of Mermaid in Peter Pan), dies at age 85.
- February 16: Ben Lanzarone, American composer (Strawberry Shortcake), dies at age 85.
- February 20: Vladimir Samsonov, Russian director (Very Blue Beard), dies at age 87.
- February 21: Pamela Salem, British actress (voice of the Queen in Hellsing Ultimate), dies at age 80.
- February 22:
  - Kent Melton, American animation sculptor (The Completely Mental Misadventures of Ed Grimley, Tiny Toon Adventures, Aladdin, Thumbelina, The Lion King, A Troll in Central Park, Pocahontas, The Hunchback of Notre Dame, Hercules, Mulan, The Prince of Egypt, Tarzan, The Road to El Dorado, Spirit: Stallion of the Cimarron, Atlantis: The Lost Empire, Treasure Planet, The Incredibles, ParaNorman, Coraline), dies at age 68.
  - Paila Pavese, Italian actress (Italian dub voice of Jessica Rabbit in Who Framed Roger Rabbit, Winnie in Planes: Fire & Rescue, Miss Montague in Gnomeo & Juliet, Suga Mama in The Proud Family, Molly Grue in The Last Unicorn), dies at age 81.
- February 23: Chris Gauthier, English-born Canadian actor (voice of Rex Guardian 4 in the Storm Hawks episode "The Code"), dies at age 48.
- February 24: Kenneth Mitchell, Canadian actor (voice of Seartave in Star Trek: Lower Decks), dies at age 49.
- February 27:
  - Richard Lewis, American actor and comedian (voice of Old Beggar in the Happily Ever After: Fairy Tales for Every Child episode "The Golden Goose", Richard in the Dr. Katz, Professional Therapist episode "Undercover", Neurosis in the Hercules episode "Hercules and the Tiff on Olympus", the Golem in The Simpsons episode "Treehouse of Horror XVII", Buddy in the Pound Puppies episode "Rebel Without a Collar", Ziggy Abler in the BoJack Horseman episode "Head in the Clouds"), dies at age 76.
  - Masaaki Maeda, Japanese actor (voice of Carozzo "Iron Mask" Ronah in Mobile Suit Gundam F91), dies at age 91.

=== March ===
- March 1: Akira Toriyama, Japanese manga artist and character designer (Dragon Ball, Dr. Slump), dies at age 68.
- March 2:
  - Mark Dodson, American voice actor (voice of Cookie Crook and Cookie Cop in ads for Cookie Crisp, Henchmoles in the Darkwing Duck episode "Aduckyphobia", the Locomotive Kid in the Bonkers episode "Trains, Toons, and Toon Trains"), dies at age 64.
  - Janice Burgess, American television writer, producer and executive (The Backyardigans, Winx Club, Bubble Guppies, Little Bill), dies at age 72.
- March 4: Tarako, Japanese voice actress (voice of Kiara in Inuyasha, Altena in Noir, Scratch in Dragon Ball Z, Boy B in Nausicaä of the Valley of the Wind, Madge in Castle in the Sky, Sugar and Beast Spirit in Urusei Yatsura, provided additional voices for My Neighbor Totoro), dies at age 63.
- March 5: Debra Byrd, American singer and vocal coach (The Lion King franchise, Thumbelina), dies at age 72.
- March 8: Angelo Nicotra, Italian voice actor (Italian voice of Mr. Potato Head in the Toy Story franchise, Tim Lockwood in the Cloudy with a Chance of Meatballs franchise, Mr. Garrison in South Park, Reflux in Incredibles 2, El Diablo in The Spongebob Movie: Sponge on the Run, Larry in Epic, Morgan Freeman in Scooby-Doo and Guess Who?, Dr. Zoidberg in Futurama, Frank the Pug in Men in Black: The Series, Herbert in Family Guy, Superintendent Chalmers in The Simpsons, Yondu Udonta in What If...?), dies at age 75.
- March 10: Mutsumi Inomata, Japanese animator (Fist of the North Star, Urusei Yatsura, Mobile Suit Gundam SEED Destiny, Space Warrior Baldios, Leda: The Fantastic Adventure of Yohko, City Hunter), dies at age 63.
- March 13: György Gát, Hungarian director and producer (A Fox's Tale), dies at age 77.
- March 14: Minori Terada, Japanese actor (voice of Colonel Muska in Castle in the Sky, Aonagi's Director in Blue Thermal), dies at age 81.
- March 16: David Seidler, British-American screenwriter (Quest for Camelot, The King and I), dies at age 86.
- March 18: James M. Ward, American game designer and screenwriter (G.I. Joe: A Real American Hero), dies at age 72.
- March 19: M. Emmet Walsh, American actor (voice of Earl Stutz in The Iron Giant, Mack in Big Guy and Rusty the Boy Robot, Olaf Hugglesbjork in Pound Puppies, Cosmic Owl in Adventure Time, Gemsbok #1 in The Wild Thornberrys episode "Rain Dance", Jeb in the What's New, Scooby-Doo? episode "A Scooby-Doo! Christmas"), dies at age 88.
- March 21: Christian Rodska, English actor (voice of Landlord and Guard in the Animated Tales of the World episode "The Magic Paintbrush"), dies at age 78.
- March 22: Laurent de Brunhoff, French author and writer (Babar: The Movie), dies at age 98.
- March 23:
  - Daniel Beretta, French actor (French dub voice of Mr. Swackhammer in Space Jam, Lumiere in Beauty and the Beast, Batou in the Ghost in the Shell franchise, President Schwarzenegger in The Simpsons Movie, Winston Zeddemore in The Real Ghostbusters, Mr. T in Johnny Bravo, King K. Rool and Krusha in Donkey Kong Country, Hugo in The Legend of Tarzan, Professor Cooper in Bubble Guppies, Foghorn Leghorn in The Looney Tunes Show), dies at age 77.
  - Eli Noyes, American animator (Clay, Or The Origin of Species, Sesame Street, Liquid Television, IDs for Nickelodeon), dies at age 81.
- March 24:
  - Zoila Quiñones, Mexican actress (Latin American dub voice of Sue in Pac-Man, Nancy in Shazzan), dies at age 83.
  - Kay Benbow, British television executive (CBeebies), dies at age 62.
- March 25:
  - Paula Weinstein, American producer (Looney Tunes: Back in Action), dies at age 78.
  - Alejandro Fried, Uruguayan-Argentine animator and comic artist (worked for Ruby-Spears and Hanna-Barbera), dies at age 58.
- March 29: Louis Gossett Jr., American actor (voice of King Zahn in Delgo, Lucius Fox in The Batman, Commander Clash in Captain Planet and the Planeteers, Sergeant Angryman in the Family Guy episode "Saving Private Brian", Chiron in the Hercules episode "Hercules and the Caledonian Boar"), dies at age 87.
- March 30: Chance Perdomo, American actor (voice of Snork in Moominvalley), dies at age 27.

=== April ===
- April 1: Joe Flaherty, American actor (portrayed Count Floyd in The Completely Mental Misadventures of Ed Grimley, voice of Lawyer and General in Heavy Metal, Big Dracula in Little Dracula, Hooft in The Legend of Tarzan, Snorkel in The Santa Claus Brothers, Cloaked Skull in Teamo Supremo, Jeb in Home on the Range, Western Union Manager, Don Knotts' Assistant and Vatican Messenger in Family Guy, Abe's Foster Dad in Clone High, Car Door Owner in the American Dad! episode "Delorean Story-An"), and television writer (wrote the Scooby-Doo! Mystery Incorporated episode "Theater of Doom"), dies at age 82.
- April 6: Dave Underwood, American voice actor (voice of Chief in You're Under Arrest, Talos in Crusher Joe, Akai in Kite, Iga in Blue Submarine No. 6), dies at age 57.
- April 7: Edgar Burcksen, Dutch editor (The Betty Boop Movie Mystery, Seabert), dies at age 76.
- April 9: Eckart Dux, German actor (German dub voice of Man-E-Faces in He-Man and the Masters of the Universe), dies at age 97.
- April 10: Dan Wallin, American sound engineer (The Bugs Bunny/Road Runner Movie, Anastasia, Pixar, Prep & Landing), dies at age 97.
- April 11: Yasuo Muramatsu, Japanese voice actor (voice of Tom in One Piece, Pisco in Case Closed, Revil in Mobile Suit Gundam, Japanese dub voice of Steelbeak in Darkwing Duck, Jacob in Joseph: King of Dreams, Santa Claus in Prep & Landing, Cyrus in ReBoot), and founder of Office Kaoru, dies at age 91.
- April 13: Ron Thompson, American actor (voice of Tony and Pete in American Pop, Cops in Last Days of Coney Island), dies at age 83.
- April 22: Philippe Laudenbach, French actor (voice of the Devil in The Girl Without Hands, French dub voice of the Narrator in Minions), dies at age 88.
- April 26: José Santa Cruz, Brazilian actor, comedian and voice actor (Brazilian dub voice of Smart Ass in Who Framed Roger Rabbit, Kim Jong-Il in Team America: World Police, Frederick in One Hundred and One Dalmatians, General Li Shang in Mulan, Professor Archimedes Q. Porter in Tarzan, Dr. Frankenstein in Alvin and the Chipmunks Meet Frankenstein, Uncle Max in The Lion King 1½, Scrooge McDuck in Mickey's Twice Upon a Christmas, Big Weld in Robots, August Gusteau in Ratatouille, J. Jonah Jameson in the Spider-Man franchise, Penguin in the Batman franchise, King Randor in He-Man and the Masters of the Universe, Megatron in the Transformers franchise, Magneto in the X-Men franchise, Tiamat in Dungeons & Dragons, Mechanicles in Aladdin, Roy Rooster in Garfield and Friends, Lawrence Limburger in Biker Mice from Mars, Sergeant Cosgrove in Freakazoid!, Big Daddy in The Fairly OddParents, Dr. Hibbert in The Simpsons, Señor Senior Senior in Kim Possible, Numbuh One in Codename: Kids Next Door, Ryu Granger in Beyblade, Watari in Death Note, Mad Mod in Teen Titans, Hiroshi Sato in The Legend of Korra, Lex Luthor in Super Friends), dies at age 95.

=== May ===
- May 5: Bernard Hill, English actor (voice of The Judge in ParaNorman, Bottom in the Shakespeare: The Animated Tales episode "A Midsummer's Night Dream", Theseus in Midsummer Dream), dies at age 79.
- May 9: Roger Corman, American director, producer (Little Shop, Fire and Ice, Aladdin and the Adventure of All Time) and actor (Hollywood Director in Looney Tunes: Back in Action), dies at age 98.
- May 16:
  - Dabney Coleman, American actor and voice actor (portrayed Dr. Beechwood in Stuart Little, voice of Monsieur Fox in the Happily Ever After: Fairy Tales for Every Child episode "Aesop's Fables: A Whodunit Musical", Principal Peter Prickly in Recess, Ashton Phillips in Jumanji, Mayor Jerry in Pound Puppies, Thomas Boyle in The Zeta Project episode "Hunt in the Hub", Horace Scope in The Magic School Bus episode "Sees Stars") dies at age 92.
  - Verónica Toussaint, Mexican actress and television presenter (Latin American dub voice of Merton in DC League of Super-Pets, Zhen in Kung Fu Panda 4, Dr. Zara in Abominable), dies at age 48.
- May 17:
  - Peter Bennett, American art director (SpongeBob SquarePants, ChalkZone), dies at age 56.
  - Hideyuki Umezu, Japanese voice actor (voice of Taifu in Zoids Wild, Principal in Patema Inverted, Saint Valentine in WWW.Working!!, Goenitz in Star Blazers 2202, Arvey Irving in The Sacred Blacksmith, Oscar Bezarius in Pandora Hearts, Collins in Blood+, Japanese dub voice of Shadow Thief in The Batman, Mad Mod in Teen Titans, Mojo in X-Men: The Animated Series, Grandmaster in Ultimate Spider-Man, Zazu in the Lion King franchise), dies at age 68.
- May 20: Eiko Masuyama, Japanese voice actress (voice of Fujiko Mine in Lupin III, Joan Randall in Captain Future, Cutie Honey in Cutie Honey, Princess Snow Kaguya in Sailor Moon S: The Movie, Little Lulu in Little Lulu and Her Little Friends, Japanese dub voice of Melody Valentine in Josie and the Pussycats), dies at age 88.
- May 22: Darryl Hickman, American actor (voice of Kid Comet in Space Stars, Wags in The Biskitts, Pac-Junior in Pac-Man, Hornet in Challenge of the GoBots, Roadie in Pole Position, Derek in The Greatest Adventure: Stories from the Bible, Marbles in GoBots: Battle of the Rock Lords, R.J. Scott in Sky Commanders, Steve Trevor in The Super Powers Team: Galactic Guardians episode "The Darkseid Deception", additional voices in Wildfire, Scooby-Doo and Scrappy Doo, The New Adventures of Jonny Quest, A Pup Named Scooby-Doo), dies at age 92.
- May 25:
  - Richard M. Sherman, American songwriter (Walt Disney Animation Studios, Snoopy Come Home, Charlotte's Web, Little Nemo: Adventures in Slumberland, The Mighty Kong), dies at age 95.
  - Albert S. Ruddy, American producer (Coonskin), dies at age 94.
- May 27:
  - Bill Walton, American basketball player and sportscaster (voiced himself in the American Dad! episode "Shakedown Steve"), dies at age 71.
  - Elizabeth MacRae, American actress (voice of Ladyfish in The Incredible Mr. Limpet), dies at age 88.
- May 30: Akira Shigino, Japanese animator (KochiKame: Tokyo Beat Cops, Osomatsu-kun, Bismark, Sailor Moon Crystal, Saban's Adventures of the Little Mermaid), dies at age 70.
- May 31: Martin Starger, American producer (The Last Unicorn), dies at age 92.

=== June ===
- June 13: Benji Gregory, American actor (voice of Biff Jr. in Back to the Future, Edgar in Once Upon a Forest, Benjamin "Ben" Letterman in Fantastic Max, Andy in the Pound Puppies episode "Pups on the Loose"), dies at age 46.
- June 14: Nancy MacKenzie, Peruvian-Mexican voice actress (voice of Mother Nature in Katy Caterpillar, Latin American dub voice of Cruella de Vil in the 101 Dalmatians franchise, Marge Simpson in The Simpsons, Mrs. Keane in The Powerpuff Girls, Sailor Galaxia in the Sailor Moon franchise, Grandma Longneck in The Land Before Time IV: Journey Through the Mists, Cody's Mother in The Rescuers Down Under, the Mouse Queen in The Great Mouse Detective, Molly Grue in The Last Unicorn, Mrs. Fitzgibbons in The Secret of NIMH, Daphne Blake in The 13 Ghosts of Scooby-Doo, Ursula in George of the Jungle, Nanny in Muppet Babies, Daisy Duke in The Dukes), dies at age 81.
- June 16: Étienne Willem, Belgian comic book artist and storyboard artist (Trollz, Liberty's Kids, DinoSquad, Strawberry Shortcake, Tara Duncan, Horseland, The Breadwinner), dies at age 51.
- June 18: Willie Mays, American baseball player (voiced himself in Willie Mays and the Say-Hey Kid), dies at age 93.
- June 19: Katsue Miwa, Japanese voice actress (voice of Unico in the Unico franchise, Hiroshi in The Monster Kid, Miki in Acrobunch, Azusa Yamato in Superbook, Lilo in One Piece, Orga in Phoenix 2772, Japanese dub voice of Dr. Ann Sinian in SWAT Kats: The Radical Squadron, Lucy Van Pelt in the Peanuts franchise), dies at age 80.
- June 20:
  - Luc Mazel, Belgian comic artist and animator (worked for Belvision), dies at age 92.
  - Donald Sutherland, Canadian actor (voice of Dr. Sid in Final Fantasy: The Spirits Within, President Stone in Astro Boy, Narrator in The Poky Little Puppy's First Christmas, Narrator and Sir Henry Fitzpatrick in Jock the Hero Dog, Charles Johnson in Pirate's Passage, Albino Crocodile in Ozi: Voice of the Forest, Clumsy Waiter in the Sunday Pants segment "The Hall of Presidents", Holllis Hurlbut in The Simpsons episode "Lisa the Iconoclast"), dies at age 88.
  - Alessandra Valeri Manera, Italian screenwriter and songwriter (wrote the lyrics to the themes for the Italian dubs of Inspector Gadget, Dragon Ball, Dragon Ball Z, Dragon Ball GT, Batman: The Animated Series, The Incredible Hulk, Superman: The Animated Series, Saint Seiya, What's New, Mr. Magoo?, Beverly Hills Teens, Magical Princess Minky Momo, Creamy Mami, the Magic Angel, Persia, the Magic Fairy, Magical Emi, the Magic Star, Kodocha), dies at age 67.
- June 25: Bill Cobbs, American actor (voice of Chief in The Wild Thornberrys episode "Dinner with Darwin", Uncle Charles in the Rugrats episode "A Rugrats Kwanzaa"), dies at age 90.
- June 26: Taiki Matsuno, Japanese actor (voice of Agumon in Digimon Savers, Arthur Jung in Mobile Suit Gundam F91, Billy in Moomin, Mr. Rascal and Kankan and Foxy in Akazukin Chacha, Rokusuke and Nishikawi in Rurouni Kenshin, Helios and Pegasus in Sailor Moon, Miguel in The Vision of Escaflowne, Kouga in Inuyasha, Japanese dub voice of SpongeBob SquarePants in the SpongeBob SquarePants franchise), dies at age 56.
- June 27: Martin Mull, American actor, comedian and musician (voice of Vlad Masters in Danny Phantom, Skip Binsford in Family Dog, Paul Prickly in Recess, Governor Kevin in Teamo Supremo, Father Donovan in American Dad!, Seth in The Simpsons episode "D'oh-in' in the Wind", Mr. Harris in the Family Guy episode "If I'm Dyin', I'm Lyin'", Dennis Tucker in The Wild Thornberrys episode "Birthday Quake", M.A.R. 10 in the Dexter's Laboratory episode "Lab on the Run", Shopkeeper in the Bob's Burgers episode "Local She-ro"), dies at age 80.
- June 29: Sigifredo Vega, Colombian actor (Latin American dub voice of Santa Claus in The Cuphead Show!, Shikijo in Rurouni Kenshin, Satotz in Hunter x Hunter, Aoi Satan in Sakura Wars, Kilobot in Cubix, Sprong in The Secret Show, Chairface Chippendale in The Tick), dies at age 77.

=== July ===
- July 1: Robert Towne, American screenwriter and director (Little Nemo: Adventures in Slumberland), dies at age 89.
- July 4: Ysanne Churchman, English actress (provided additional voices for The Twelve Tasks of Asterix), dies at age 99.
- July 9: Jerzy Stuhr, Polish actor, director and screenwriter (Polish dub voice of Mushu in the Mulan franchise, Donkey in the Shrek franchise), dies at age 77.
- July 10: Tom Wyner, American voice actor (voice of Grimlock in Transformers: Robots in Disguise, Inspector Blooper in The New Adventures of Gigantor, Roman and Weitre in Vampire Hunter D, Jonathan Wolfe in the Robotech franchise, Thugmeister and Jagi Thug in Fist of the North Star, Legato in Windaria, Puppet Master in the Ghost in the Shell franchise, Quent Yaiden in Wolf's Rain), dies at age 77.
- July 11: Shelley Duvall, American actress (voice of Ocka in the Aaahh!!! Real Monsters episode "Oblina Without a Cause", Fairy in the Adventures from the Book of Virtues episode "Perseverance"), dies at age 75.
- July 12: Noriko Ohara, Japanese voice actress (voice of Nobita in the Doraemon franchise, Peter in Heidi, Girl of the Alps, Majyo in Time Bokan, Narrator in The Rose of Versailles, Supreme Commander Teral in Space Emperor God Sigma, Oyuki in the Urusei Yatsura franchise, Japanese dub voice of Miss Bianca in The Rescuers, Valerie Brown in Josie and the Pussycats, Penelope Pitstop in Wacky Races and The Perils of Penelope Pitstop), dies at age 88.
- July 13:
  - Richard Simmons, American fitness personality (voiced himself in the Johnny Bravo episode "T is for Trouble" and the KaBlam! episode "Sasquatch-ercize", Physediphus in Hercules, Coach Salmons in Fish Hooks, Boone in Rudolph the Red-Nosed Reindeer: The Movie, Aerobics Instructor in the Rocko's Modern Life episode "No Pain, No Gain"), dies at age 76.
  - Shannen Doherty, American actress (voice of Teresa in The Secret of NIMH, Breeze in the Gary & Mike episode "Phish Phry"), dies at age 53.
  - James B. Sikking, American actor (voice of Vice Principal Healy in Rocket Power, Seiya Tsukishima in Whisper of the Heart, Harry Caulder in the Batman Beyond episode "Mind Games", James Madison in the Duckman episode "The Once and Future Duck", Dr. Carson in the Aaahh!!! Real Monsters episode "Nuclear and Present Danger"), dies at age 90.
- July 15: Whitney Rydbeck, American actor (provided additional voices for Oliver & Company), dies at age 79.
- July 18: Bob Newhart, American actor and comedian (voice of Bernard in The Rescuers and The Rescuers Down Under, Leonard in Rudolph the Red-Nosed Reindeer: The Movie, himself in The Simpsons episode "Bart the Fink"), dies at age 94.
- July 29: Erica Ash, American actress (voice of Julie Vous Coucher in the Bless the Harts episode "My Best Frenda", Wendy in the Aquaman: King of Atlantis episode "Primordeous"), dies from breast cancer at age 46.

=== August ===
- August 1: Krzysztof Banaszyk, Polish actor (Polish dub voice of Gambit in X-Men: Evolution, D.J. Drake in Looney Tunes: Back in Action, Ethan Bennett in The Batman, Li Shang in Mulan II, Hulk in The Super Hero Squad Show), dies at age 54.
- August 6: Roberto Espriú Sen, Mexican actor and voice actor (Latin American voice of General White and Commander Red in Dragon Ball, Hercule Satan in Dragon Ball Z, Three Star Dragon in Dragon Ball GT, Boris in The Vision of Escaflowne, Baron Fullmoon in Gulliver Boy, Mr. Kerrigan in Steamboy), dies at age 78.
- August 8: Mitzi McCall, American actress and comedian (voice of Mother Goose in Mother Goose and Grimm, Penny Pillar in The Pebbles and Bamm-Bamm Show, Ammonia Pine in Darkwing Duck, Auntie Marina in Snorks, Talula La Trane in Yo Yogi!, Glyptodont in Ice Age, Sylvia Jenkins in Free for All, Nanny in The Grim Adventures of Billy & Mandy episode "Scary Poppins", Miss Burns in the Gravedale High episode "Goodbye Gravedale", Una in the TaleSpin episode "Destiny Rides Again", Mistress Nina in the Duckman episode "Psyche", Mame Slaughter in the Captain Planet and the Planeteers episode "Five Ring Panda-Monium", Pearl in the Hey Arnold! episode "Arnold's Thanksgiving", Golda Meir in the Histeria! episode "Histeria Around the World: Part 2", Vulture in The Wild Thornberrys episode "Gift of Gab", Old Woman #1 in the American Dad! episode "1600 Candles", Librarian in the Regular Show episode "Go Viral"), dies at age 93.
- August 10: Rachael Lillis, American voice actress (voice of Misty, Jessie, and Jigglypuff in seasons 1-8 of Pokémon, Utena Tenjo in Revolutionary Girl Utena, Mito Freecss in Hunter × Hunter, Martina in Slayers Next, Major Yuriko Star in The Irresponsible Captain Tylor, Headmistress Faragonda in the 4Kids dub of Winx Club, Charlotte in Berserk, Hela Nemo in Cubix, Danny in Sonic X, Ohno in Genshiken, Lonae in Teenage Mutant Ninja Turtles, Micott Barscht in Mobile Suit Gundam Unicorn), dies from breast cancer at age 55.
- August 11: Samir Chamas, Lebanese actor (Lebanese dub voice of Skipper in Planes and Planes: Fire & Rescue, Papa Smurf in The Smurfs), dies at age 81.
- August 14: Gena Rowlands, American actress (voice of Grandmother in Persepolis), dies at age 94.
- August 18: Boris Bystrov, Russian actor (Russian dub voice of Taurus Bulba in Darkwing Duck, Thaddeus Plotz in Animaniacs, Homer Simpson in The Simpsons Movie), dies at age 79.
- August 20: Atsuko Tanaka, Japanese actress (voice of Motoko Kusanagi in the Ghost in the Shell franchise, Konan in Naruto, Caster in the Fate/stay night franchise, Lisa Lisa in JoJo's Bizarre Adventure, Claudette in Queen's Blade, Francis Midford in Black Butler, Karura in Utawarerumono, Bayonetta in Bayonetta: Bloody Fate, Hanami in Jujutsu Kaisen, Japanese dub voice of Botanica in Beast Machines: Transformers, Vanessa Fisk in Spider-Man: Into the Spider-Verse, Riley's Mother in Inside Out, Monkey and Sariatu in Kubo and the Two Strings), dies at age 61.
- August 23:
  - Wojciech Paszkowski, Polish actor (Polish dub voice of Maurice in the Madagascar franchise, Dinky Dalton in The Huckleberry Hound Show, The Great Gazoo in The Flintstones, Roy Rooster in Garfield and Friends, Captain America in Spider-Man, Galactus and Blastaar in Fantastic Four, Hulk in Iron Man, Timon in Timon and Pumbaa, Beta Ray Bill in Silver Surfer, Zapp Brannigan in Futurama, Catbert in Dilbert, Skeletor in He-Man and the Masters of the Universe, Red Alert and Wing Saber in Transformers: Cybertron, Poe in Ruby Gloom, Black Manta and Etrigan in Batman: The Brave and the Bold, Nick Fury in The Avengers: Earth's Mightiest Heroes, J.A.R.V.I.S. and Uncle Ben in Ultimate Spider-Man, Flam and Star Swirl in My Little Pony: Friendship is Magic), dies at age 64.
  - István Pathó, Hungarian actor (voice of Bank Executive in Cat City, Mump in The Princess and the Goblin), dies at age 89.
- August 24: Karel Heřmánek, Czech actor (Czech dub voice of Hercules in Spiff and Hercules, Gill in Finding Nemo, Django in Ratatouille, Black Wolf in The Flight Before Christmas, Max Horowitz in Mary and Max, Uncle Topolino in Cars 2, King Fergus in Brave, Jake in Free Birds, Julius Caesar in Asterix: The Mansions of the Gods, Xibalba in The Book of Life), dies at age 76.
- August 30: Fatman Scoop, American rapper (voiced himself in The Boondocks episode "The Story of Thugnificent"), dies at age 53.

=== September ===
- September 1:
  - Brian Trueman, English screenwriter (Danger Mouse, Count Duckula, Chorlton and the Wheelies, Jamie and the Magic Torch, Cockleshell Bay, The Wind in the Willlows, Victor & Hugo: Bunglers in Crime, Truckers, Wallace & Gromit, Budgie the Little Helicopter, The Treacle People, Thomas & Friends, Jungle Junction) and actor (voice of the Narrator in Jamie and the Magic Torch, the Narrator in Cockleshell Bay, Weasels in The Wind in the Willows, Stiletto in Danger Mouse, Dorcas Del Icatessen in Truckers, Nanny in Count Duckula, Stilleto and Nanny in Victor & Hugo: Bunglers in Crime, Charlie in The Treacle People, Auntie Dame and Hunter in Franny's Feet), dies at age 92.
  - Eric Gilliland, American screenwriter (The Thief and the Cobbler) and actor (voice of Spud in Hair High). dies at age 62.
- September 2: James Darren, American actor and singer (voice of Jimmy Darrock in The Flintstones episode "Surfin' Fred", singing voice of Yogi Bear in Hey There, It's Yogi Bear!), dies at age 88.
- September 4: Bernie Mireault, Canadian comic book artist and animator (Heavy Metal, C.L.Y.D.E.), dies at age 63.
- September 5:
  - Manuel Antín, Argentinian director (voice of Sr. Tecnologia in Mercano el Marciano), dies at age 98.
  - Sérgio Mendes, Brazilian musician (voice of Samba School Director in Rio, Street Vendor in Rio 2, composed songs for both films), dies at age 83.
- September 6: Will Jennings, American lyricist (Pinocchio and the Emperor of the Night, The Land Before Time, An American Tail: Fievel Goes West), dies at age 80.
- September 8:
  - Emi Shinohara, Japanese voice actress (voice of Sailor Jupiter in Sailor Moon, Biko "B.K." Daitokuji in Project A-Ko, Kekko Kamen in Kekko Kamen, Maria Pia Armonia in Mobile Suit V Gundam, Kagero in Ninja Scroll, Fuaru Presea in Magic Knight Rayearth, Ruby in Burn-Up Excess, Yayoi Matsugana in Nightwalker: The Midnight Detective, Kaho Mizuki in Cardcaptor Sakura, Charlotte in Vampire Hunter D: Bloodlust, Agent L in Dragon Drive, Angel in The Big O, Motoko Hara in Gunparade March, Xia Yu Fan in Full Metal Panic!, Oiran Uneshino in Ghost Slayers Ayashi, Shizuko Aoki in Smile PreCure!, Japanese dub voice of Penelope Pussycat in the Looney Tunes franchise, Perdita in 101 Dalmatians: The Series, Francine Langstrom in Batman: The Animated Series, Rita in Animaniacs, Lurleen Lumpkin in The Simpsons, Polaris in X-Men: The Animated Series), dies at age 61.
  - Peter Renaday, American actor (voice of Splinter in Teenage Mutant Ninja Turtles, Sir George in Ben 10: Ultimate Alien, Abraham Lincoln in Animaniacs and Evil Con Carne, Uncle Sam in the Batman: The Brave and the Bold episode "Cry Freedom Fighters!", Howard Stark in the Iron Man episode "Not Far from the Tree"), dies at age 89.
  - Philip Williams, Canadian actor (voice of Baxter Bevel in Rolie Polie Olie, Banshee in X-Men: The Animated Series, Ted in Miss Spider's Sunny Patch Friends, Zephir in Babar, Toulouse in Cadillacs and Dinosaurs, Sergeant Murphy in The Busy World of Richard Scarry, Stanley in Stickin' Around, Klang in Pippi Longstocking, Mr. Breen in the Anne of Green Gables: The Animated Series episode "The Avonlea Herald", Mr. MacKenzie in the Braceface episode "Angels Among Us", Zell and Yug in the Time Warp Trio episode "The Cavemen Catastrophe", provided additional voices for Wild C.A.T.s, George and Martha, Busytown Mysteries, Hotel Transylvania: The Series, continued voice of Buzz in Cyberchase), dies at age 70.
- September 9: James Earl Jones, American actor (voice of Mufasa in The Lion King franchise, Darth Vader in the Star Wars franchise, Ommadon in The Flight of Dragons, the Emperor of the Night in Pinocchio and the Emperor of the Night, Kibosh in Casper: A Spirited Beginning, Martin Luther King Sr. in Our Friend, Martin, Santa Claus in the Recess episode "Yes Mikey Santa Does Shave", the Mover, Serak the Preparer in The Simpsons episode "Treehouse of Horror" and Maggie Simpson in The Simpsons episode "Treehouse of Horror V"), dies at age 93.
- September 11: Nigel Lambert, English voice actor (voice of Mr. Curry in The Adventures of Paddington Bear, Sebastian the Raven and Messenger in The Princess and the Pea, Crapoux in Azur & Asmar: The Princes' Quest, Justtice Offers 1, 2 and 3 in Justin and the Knights of Valour), dies at age 80.
- September 16: Barbara Leigh-Hunt, English actress (voice of Helena in A Midsummer Night's Dream, Captain Mildred and Mary the Hover Fairy in Charlie Chalk, Farmer's Wife in The Plague Dogs), dies at age 88.
- September 17: Florence Warner, American singer (voice of the Balladeer and Adult Abigail in Once Upon a Forest, provided additional voices for Jem, performed "Once Upon a Time With Me" for Once Upon a Forest), dies at age 77.
- September 19: Daniel Fanego, Argentine actor (voice of Martin Fierro in Fierro), dies at age 69.
- September 20:
  - David Graham, English actor (voice of Gordon Tracy in the Thunderbirds franchise, Grandpa Pig in Peppa Pig, Wise Old Elf in Ben & Holly's Little Kingdom, Dr. Horatio Beaker in Supercar, Professor Matthew Matic in Fireball XL5, The Brown Bear in Stowaways on the Ark, Snork in Moomin), dies at age 99.
  - Kathryn Crosby, American actress and singer (voice of Princess Yasminda in 1001 Arabian Nights), dies at age 90.
- September 23: Gary Reineke, American-Canadian actor (voice of Sheerky in The Neverending Story episode "End of Time"), dies at age 84.
- September 26: John Ashton, American actor (voice of Instructor in the King of the Hill episode "Pregnant Paws"), dies at age 76.
- September 27: Maggie Smith, English actress (voice of Lady Bluebury in Gnomeo & Juliet and Sherlock Gnomes), dies at age 89.
- September 28: Kris Kristofferson, American actor and musician (voice of Doc in The Land Before Time VI: The Secret of Saurus Rock, Old Donkey in The Star, Pops in the Handy Manny episode "Motorcycle Adventure"), dies at age 88.
- September 29: Nobuyo Ōyama, Japanese actress (voice of the titular character in the Doraemon franchise, Monokuma in Danganronpa: The Animation), dies at age 90.
- September 30:
  - Gavin Creel, American actor (voice of Matthews in Rapunzel's Tangled Adventure), dies at age 48.
  - Bob Foster, American animator, storyboard artist, comic writer, editor (worked for Filmation, Hanna-Barbera, DePatie-Freleng, Marvel Animation and on Mickey Mouse Clubhouse, My Friends Tigger and Pooh) and president of The Animation Guild, dies at age 81.
  - Ken Page, American actor and singer (voice of Oogie Boogie in The Nightmare Before Christmas, King Gator in All Dogs Go to Heaven, Narrator in the All Grown Up! episode "Blind Man's Bluff"), dies at age 70.
  - Frank Fritz, American antique picker and reality television host (voice of himself in the American Dad! episode "Family Plan"), dies at age 58.
  - Robert Watts, British producer (Who Framed Roger Rabbit, An American Tail: Fievel Goes West) and actor (provided additional voices for An American Tail: Fievel Goes West), dies at age 86.

=== October ===
- October 1: Bob Yerkes, American stuntman (Who Framed Roger Rabbit), dies at age 92.
- October 4: Marina Voskanyants, Russian animator (The Key, The Bremen Town Musicians, Three from Prostokvashino, The Mystery of the Third Planet, The Tale of Tsar Saltan), dies at age 90.
- October 5: Doc Harris, Canadian radio broadcaster and actor (voice of Grogar in My Little Pony: Friendship Is Magic, Jeke in Green Legend Ran, Captain in Eat-Man '98, Golem in Monster Rancher, Old Guard in the Ninjago episode "The Darkness Comes", narrator of Captain N: The Game Master, The New Adventures of He-Man and the Ocean Productions dub of the Dragon Ball franchise), dies at age 76.
- October 12: Lillian Schwartz, American artist and pioneer of computer-mediated art, dies at age 97.
- October 16:
  - Liam Payne, British singer (voice of B-Bot in Ron's Gone Wrong, himself in the Family Guy episode "Run, Chris, Run"), dies at 31.
  - Danny Mandia, Filipino dubbing director (Heidi, Girl of the Alps, Dog of Flanders, Anne of Green Gables, Voltron, Tales of Little Women, Peter Pan: The Animated Series, The Twins of Destiny, The Legend of Snow White, Magic Knight Rayearth, Akazukin Chacha, Zenki, Kim Possible, Ragnarok the Animation), dies at age 70.
- October 17: Toshiyuki Nishida, Japanese actor (voice of Koichi Tabuchi in There Goes Our Hero, The Heat of the Pennant Race and After the Ball Game, Iwa in A Letter to Momo, Japanese dub voice of Bigweld in Robots), dies at age 76.
- October 23: Jack Jones, American singer (voice of the Frog in Over the Garden Wall), dies at age 86.
- October 28: Ulf Pilgaard, Danish actor (voice of Krabben in Help! I'm a Fish), dies at age 83.
- October 29: Teri Garr, American actress (voice of Mary McGinnis in Batman Beyond, Molly Quinn in Aloha, Scooby-Doo!, Selena in The Legend of Prince Valiant, Vanessa Le Pert in the Duckman episode "It's the Thing of the Principal", Laney in the King of the Hill episode "Bill of Sales", Sandy Gordon in the What's New, Scooby-Doo? episode "Toy Story Boo"), dies at age 79.
- October 31:
  - Candy Devine, Australian radio broadcaster and singer (voice of Vera in All Dogs Go to Heaven), dies at age 85.
  - Greg Hildebrandt, American poster artist (Animal Crackers) and character designer (Little Orphan Annie's A Very Animated Christmas), dies at age 85.

=== November ===
- November 1: Austin Roberts, American singer and songwriter (performed the songs in season 2 of Scooby-Doo Where Are You!), dies at age 79.
- November 2:
  - Alan Rachins, American actor (voice of Norman Osborn in The Spectacular Spider-Man, Clock King in the DC Animated Universe, Ned Staples in Scooby-Doo! Mecha Mutt Menace), dies at age 82.
  - Jonathan Haze, American actor (voice of Mann Servante in The Angry Beavers episode "The Day the World Got Really Screwed Up"), dies at age 95.
- November 3: Quincy Jones, American record producer, songwriter, composer, arranger, and film and television producer (portrayed himself in Fantasia 2000, voiced himself in The Boondocks episode "A Huey Freeman Christmas"), dies at age 91.
- November 5: Elwood Edwards, American voice actor (voice of Virtual Doctor in The Simpsons episode "Little Big Mom"), dies at age 74.
- November 6:
  - Tony Todd, American actor (voice of Darkseid in the DC Animated Movie Universe, Dreadwing in Transformers: Prime, Icon in Young Justice, Slyrak in Dota: Dragon's Blood, Scare Glow in Masters of the Universe: Revelation, Asteroth in the Batman: The Brave and the Bold episode "Trials of the Demon!", Shaman in the Sym-Bionic Titan episode "Shaman of Fear", Aeon Worm in the Bravest Warriors episode "Season of the Mitch"), dies at age 69.
  - Michie Kita, Japanese voice actress (voice of Togenishia in Hana no Ko Lunlun, Nobuhiko Obayashi in Don Dracula, Eru in Doraemon: Nobita and the Castle of the Undersea Devil), dies at age 89.
- November 9: George Wilkins, American composer (The Adventures of Teddy Ruxpin, The All-New Popeye Hour, Return to Oz), dies at age 90.
- November 12:
  - Timothy West, English actor (voice of King Dymas in Sinbad: Legend of the Seven Seas, Hrothgar in Animated Epics: Beowulf, Prospero in Shakespeare: The Animated Tales episode "The Tempest"), dies at age 90.
  - Eiji Yanagisawa, Japanese voice actor (voice of Yasyazaru in Baki the Grappler, Trailmon in Digimon Frontier, Nishiya in Speed Grapher, Taiin in Code Geass), dies at age 57.
- November 13: Dan Hennessey, Canadian voice actor (voice of Brave Heart Lion in the Care Bears franchise, RoboCop in RoboCop, Chief Quimby in Inspector Gadget, Bully Koopa in The Adventures of Super Mario Bros. 3 and Super Mario World, Bolivar Trask, Abraham Cornelius, Sunder, Ruckus and Chrome in X-Men: The Animated Series, Father Bear in Little Bear, Beaster and Nasty Nigel in My Pet Monster, Turbo Tu-Tone, Bullit, and Boll Weevil in COPS, provided additional voices for Wild C.A.T.s), dies at age 82.
- November 15: Jon Kenny, Irish comedian and actor (voice of Ferry Dan and The Great Seanachai in Song of the Sea, Stringy Woodcutter and Ned in Wolfwalkers), dies at age 66.
- November 20:
  - Andy Paley, American songwriter, composer, and record producer (Nickelodeon Animation Studio, Cartoon Network Studios, Handy Manny, Digimon Adventure), dies at age 72.
  - Peter Maddocks, English editorial cartoonist, comic artist and animator (The Family-Ness, Jimbo and the Jet Set, Penny Crayon), dies at age 96.
- November 23:
  - Julio Medina, Colombian actor (voice of Miguel in The New Adventures of Zorro, provided additional voices for Scooby-Doo and Scrappy-Doo, Mister T), dies at age 91.
  - Chuck Woolery, American game show host and musician (voiced himself in The Cleveland Show episode "Love Rollercoaster"), dies at age 83.
- November 24: Yōji Kuri, Japanese cartoonist and independent filmmaker dies at age 96.
- November 25: Earl Holliman, American actor (voice of Milton in the Captain Planet and the Planeteers episode "Never the Twain Shall Meet"), dies at age 96.
- November 27:
  - Adam Somner, American producer (The Adventures of Tintin, Who Framed Roger Rabbit) and assistant director (The Adventures of Tintin, Rango, The Cat Returns), dies at age 57.
  - Morgan Lofting, American actress (voice of the Baroness in G.I. Joe: A Real American Hero, Fistina and Yetta in Ben 10: Omniverse, Aunt May and Black Cat in Spider-Man, Moonracer and Firestar in The Transformers), dies at age 84.

=== December ===
- December 2: Paul Maslansky, American producer (Police Academy), dies at age 91.
- December 5: Carol Goldwasser, American casting director (American Dad!), dies at age 67.
- December 8: Jill Jacobson, American actress (voice of Marina's Mother in The Stone Boy), dies at age 70.
- December 10: David Carling, British voice actor (voice of Station Officer Steele, Mike Flood, Tom Thomas and Trevor Evans in Fireman Sam, Rainbow and Bread Man in Sarah & Duck, provided additional voices for Snow White: The Sequel), dies at age 55.
- December 11
  - Michio Mamiya, Japanese composer (Grave of the Fireflies), dies at age 95.
  - Stéphane Nutini, French network and computer technician (Miraculous: Tales of Ladybug & Cat Noir, Iron Man: Armored Adventures) dies at 46.
- December 12:
  - Márcia Gomes, Brazilian voice actress (Brazilian dub voice of Luna in Sailor Moon, Janine Melnitz in The Real Ghostbusters, Didi Pickles in Rugrats, Eris in Saint Seiya), dies at age 77.
  - David Weatherley, British-born New Zealand actor (voice of Tuckered in Mosley), dies at age 85.
- December 13: Diane Delano, American actress (voice of Ma Vreedle in the Ben 10 franchise, Tuba in Infinity Train, Stompa in Superman: The Animated Series, Pantha in Teen Titans, Big Barda in the Batman: The Brave and the Bold episode "The Last Bat on Earth!", Captain Nekton in the Niko and the Sword of Light episode "Sky Whale City"), dies at age 67.
- December 20: John Erwin, American actor (voice of the title character in He-Man and the Masters of the Universe, Reggie Mantle in The Archie Show), dies at age 88.
- December 21: Art Evans, American actor (voice of Charlie in The Proud Family: Louder and Prouder episode "Old Towne Road"), dies at age 82.
- December 22: Roze Stiebra, Latvian animator (The Cat's Mill), dies at age 82.
- December 25: Britt Allcroft, English writer, producer, director and voice actress (creator of Thomas & Friends and Magic Adventures of Mumfie), dies at age 81.
- December 27: Olivia Hussey, British-Argentine actress (voice of Talia al Ghul in the DC Animated Universe, Queen in the Pinky and the Brain episode "Melancholy Brain"), dies at age 73.
- December 29:
  - Linda Lavin, American actress and singer (voice of Mama Bird in the Courage the Cowardly Dog episode "Watch the Birdies", Helen in the Bob's Burgers episode "It Snakes a Village", Barb in Diary of a Wimpy Kid: Rodrick Rules, Mrs. Steunberg in Whitewash), dies at age 87.
  - Mike Toth, American animator (Tarzan, Mulan, The Kid Super Power Hour with Shazam!, He-Man and the Masters of the Universe, She-Ra: Princess of Power, A Snow White Christmas, Beauty and the Beast, The Princess and the Frog, The Hunchback of Notre Dame), dies at an unknown age.
- December 30: John Capodice, American actor (voice of Cab Driver in Teenage Mutant Ninja Turtles: Mutant Mayhem, Cabbie and Johnny in the Aaahh!!! Real Monsters episode "A Room With No Viewfinder/Krumm Rises to the Top", Caesar Carlini in the Superman: The Animated Series episode "World's Finest"), dies at age 83.
