= Gavin Greenaway =

English music composer, conductor

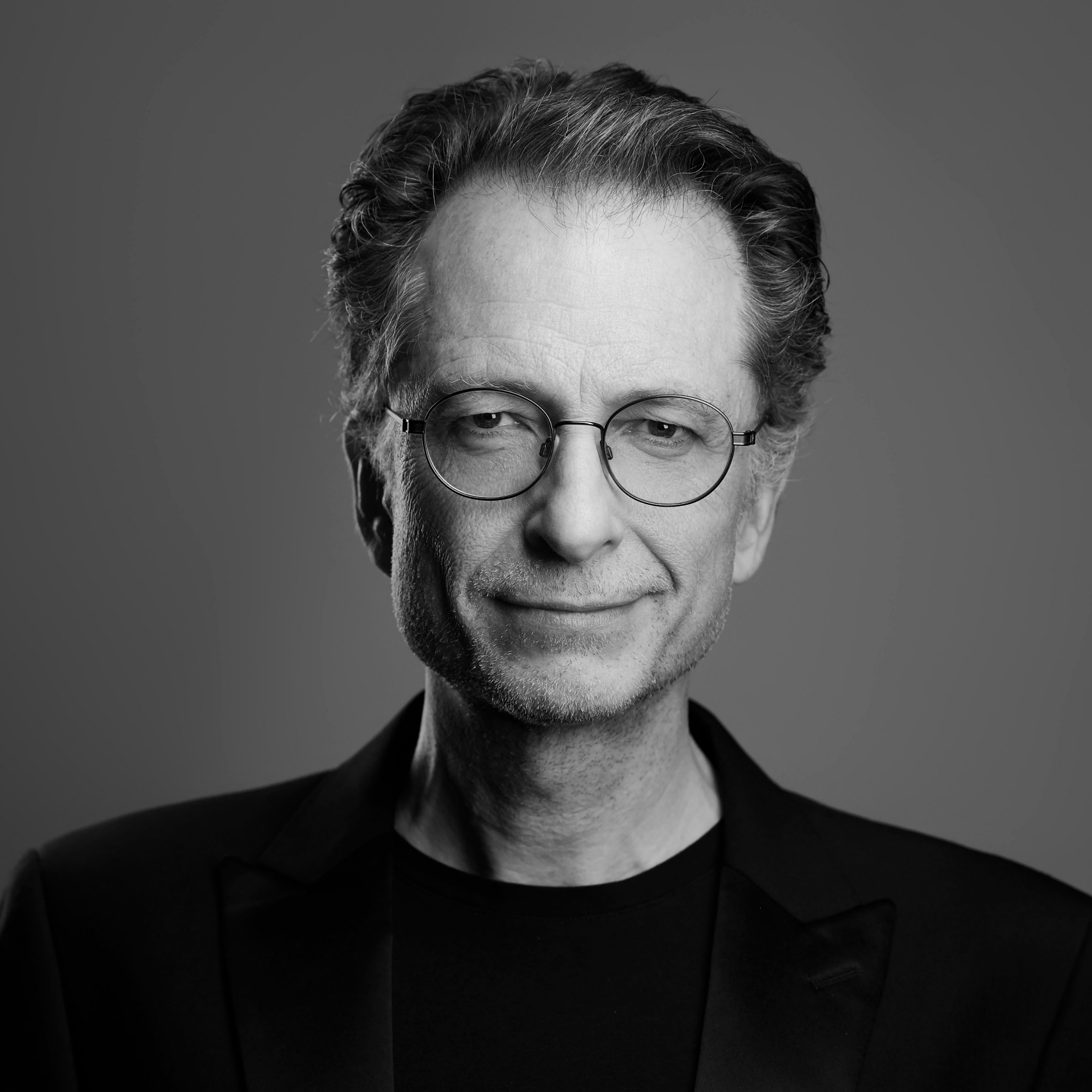
- Greenaway in March 2024

Background information
- Born: Gavin Greenaway; 15 June 1964 (age 62); London, England
- Genres: Film Score, Classical
- Occupations: Pianist, Composer, Conductor, arranger
- Instrument: Piano
- Website: gavingreenaway.com

Gavin Greenaway (born 15 June 1964) is an English music composer and conductor. He is the son of Roger Greenaway.

== Early life and career ==
Educated at Strode's College and Trinity College of Music, Greenaway started working with his father before leaving school. Their compositions for BBC children's television include Jimbo and the Jet-Set, The Family Ness and Penny Crayon, as well as Channel 4's 1996 drama The Fragile Heart.

Greenaway also conducted the scores for the films The Thin Red Line, Gladiator and Pearl Harbor, all of which were composed by Hans Zimmer. He also conducted many scores for DreamWorks Animation such as Shrek, Chicken Run, Antz, Wallace & Gromit: The Curse of the Were-Rabbit, The Prince of Egypt, Bee Movie, and The Road to El Dorado. In addition, he was commissioned by Disney to compose the score for their fireworks show IllumiNations: Reflections of Earth and a parade called Tapestry of Nations at Epcot. The resulting music from the fireworks show have been used by Disney since 1999. With permission from Disney, who hold the rights to the composition, and the Hal Leonard Corp., who hold the publishing rights, Reflections of Earth has now been arranged for the idiom full symphonic wind band and dedicated to the Pennsylvania Symphonic Winds and their musical director Phil Evans. The first performance of this arrangement was in Radnor PA on 2 December 2012.

For Tokyo DisneySea, Greenaway composed the score for "BraviSEAmo!", the nightly pyrotechnics and water show in 2004. He also conducted in Paul McCartney's oratorio Ecce Cor Meum, and has provided music-only soundtracks to accompany VHS-releases such as The Everton Football Club Season Review 1988/89.

His music was heard during both the 2000 Super Bowl XXXIV Halftime Show and the 2010 Winter Olympics opening ceremony.

Greenaway was one of the composers commissioned to write music for the Thames Diamond Jubilee Pageant in 2012 to honour the Diamond Jubilee of Elizabeth II. The piece, entitled The New Water Music, was inspired by the George Frederic Handel's Water Music and contained movements by several modern British composers working under the direction of Greenaway. After the pageant, Greenaway was critical of BBC's live coverage of the pageant, as it did not feature the performance at all. In his personal blog, he expressed the view that the presenters had focused on interviewing celebrities and ignored the musicians.

He has also recently conducted music for the Star Wars anthology film, Solo: A Star Wars Story.

Il Falco Bianco is Gavin Greenaway's first solo piano album, released in May 2016.

Woven is Gavin Greenaway's second album released in November 2018

Together with cellist Caroline Dale, Gavin Greenaway formed a duo called Cloud Chamber. The album Skylines is due for release Oct 2026.

== Filmography ==
=== Feature films ===
Year	Title	Composer(s)	Notes
1992	Peter's Friends	—N/a	Musical director
1993	Needful Things	Patrick Doyle	Additional music arranger
1994	Exit to Eden	Patrick Doyle	Additional orchestrator
1995	Beyond Rangoon	Hans Zimmer	Orchestrator
1997	Face/Off	John Powell	Composer of additional music
1997	The Peacemaker	Hans Zimmer	Conductor
1998	Antz	Harry Gregson-Williams; John Powell	Composer of additional music; Conductor
1998	The Prince of Egypt	Hans Zimmer	Conductor
1998	The Thin Red Line	Hans Zimmer	Conductor
1999	Forces of Nature	John Powell	Additional music arranger; Composer of additional music (uncredited); Conductor
1999	Light It Up	Harry Gregson-Williams	Conductor
2000	The Road to El Dorado	Hans Zimmer; John Powell	Composer of additional music (uncredited); Conductor
2000	Gladiator	Lisa Gerrard; Hans Zimmer	Conductor
2000	Chicken Run	Harry Gregson-Williams; John Powell	Composer of additional music (uncredited); Conductor
2001	Hannibal	Hans Zimmer	Conductor
2001	Shrek	Harry Gregson-Williams; John Powell	Conductor
2001	Pearl Harbor	Hans Zimmer	Conductor
2001	Evolution	John Powell	Composer of additional music; Conductor
2001	I Am Sam	John Powell	Conductor
2002	D-Tox	John Powell; Irman SA	Conductor
2002	The Time Machine	Klaus Badelt	Conductor
2002	Spirit: Stallion of the Cimarron	Hans Zimmer	Composer of additional music (uncredited); Conductor
2003	Paycheck	John Powell	Conductor
2005	The Ring Two	Hans Zimmer; Henning Lohner; Martin Tillman	Conductor
2005	Madagascar	Hans Zimmer	Conductor
2005	Batman Begins	Hans Zimmer; James Newton Howard	Conductor
2005	Wallace & Gromit: The Curse of the Were-Rabbit	Julian Nott	Conductor
2006	United 93	John Powell	Conductor
2006	Happy Feet	John Powell	Additional music arranger
2006	Blood Diamond	James Newton Howard	Conductor (children's choir)
2007	The Bourne Ultimatum	John Powell	Conductor; credited as "Gravin Greenaway"
2007	Bee Movie	Rupert Gregson-Williams	Conductor
2007	The Golden Compass	Alexandre Desplat	Additional conductor
2007	The Great Debaters	James Newton Howard; Peter Golub	Conductor
2008	Iron Man	Ramin Djawadi	Conductor
2008	Kung Fu Panda	Hans Zimmer; John Powell	Conductor
2008	The Dark Knight	Hans Zimmer; James Newton Howard	Conductor
2008	Madagascar: Escape 2 Africa	Hans Zimmer	Conductor
2009	Monsters vs. Aliens	Henry Jackman	Conductor (score and choir)
2009	Transformers: Revenge of the Fallen	Hans Zimmer; Steve Jablonsky	Conductor (choir)
2009	9	Deborah Lurie	Conductor
2009	Sherlock Holmes	Hans Zimmer	Conductor
2010	Henri 4	Hans Zimmer; Henry Jackman	Conductor
2010	Green Zone	John Powell	Conductor
2010	Kick-Ass	Henry Jackman; Ilan Eshkeri; John Murphy; Marius de Vries	Conductor
2010	How to Train Your Dragon	John Powell	Additional orchestrator; Conductor (score and choir)
2010	Fair Game	John Powell	Conductor
2010	Despicable Me	Heitor Pereira	Music director
2010	Inception	Hans Zimmer	Score consultant
2010	Megamind	Hans Zimmer; Lorne Balfe	Conductor (score and choir)
2010	Love & Other Drugs	James Newton Howard	Conductor
2010	Tron: Legacy	Daft Punk	Conductor
2010	Gulliver's Travels	Henry Jackman	Conductor
2011	Pirates of the Caribbean: On Stranger Tides	Hans Zimmer	Conductor (choir)
2011	Kung Fu Panda 2	Hans Zimmer; John Powell	Additional orchestrator; Conductor (score and choir)
2011	Transformers: Dark of the Moon	Steve Jablonsky	Conductor (choir)
2011	Puss in Boots	Henry Jackman	Conductor (score and choir)
2011	Sherlock Holmes: A Game of Shadows	Hans Zimmer	Conductor
2012	Man on a Ledge	Henry Jackman	Conductor
2012	Safe House	Ramin Djawadi	Conductor
2012	The Hunger Games	James Newton Howard	Conductor (score and choir); Orchestrator
2012	The Pirates! In an Adventure with Scientists!	Theodore Shapiro	Conductor
2012	Madagascar 3: Europe's Most Wanted	Hans Zimmer	Conductor (score and choir)
2012	Abraham Lincoln: Vampire Hunter	Henry Jackman	Conductor
2012	The Dark Knight Rises	Hans Zimmer	Conductor
2012	Total Recall	Harry Gregson-Williams	Conductor
2013	Fast & Furious 6	Lucas Vidal	Conductor
2013	Turbo	Henry Jackman	Conductor
2013	Ender's Game	Steve Jablonsky	Conductor
2014	Captain America: The Winter Soldier	Henry Jackman	Conductor
2014	How to Train Your Dragon 2	John Powell	Conductor
2014	Interstellar	Hans Zimmer	Conductor
2014	Kingsman: The Secret Service	Henry Jackman; Matthew Margeson	Conductor
2015	Dough	Lorne Balfe	Conductor
2015	Terminator Genisys	Lorne Balfe	Conductor
2015	Pan	John Powell	Conductor
2015	Burnt	Rob Simonsen	Conductor
2016	Batman v Superman: Dawn of Justice	Hans Zimmer; Tom Holkenborg	Conductor (choir)
2016	Captain America: Civil War	Henry Jackman	Conductor
2016	Spark	Robert Duncan	Conductor
2016	The Angry Birds Movie	Heitor Pereira	Conductor
2016	Jason Bourne	David Buckley; John Powell	Conductor
2016	Brimstone	Tom Holkenborg	Conductor
2016	Miss Peregrine's Home for Peculiar Children	Matthew Margeson; Mike Higham	Conductor (choir)
2016	A Cure for Wellness	Benjamin Wallfisch	Conductor
2017	Kong: Skull Island	Henry Jackman	Conductor
2017	La Gran Promesa	Rodrigo Flores López	Conductor
2017	The Boss Baby	Hans Zimmer; Steve Mazzaro	Conductor
2017	Guardians of the Galaxy Vol. 2	Tyler Bates	Conductor
2017	Pirates of the Caribbean: Dead Men Tell No Tales	Geoff Zanelli	Conductor (choir)
2017	Dunkirk	Hans Zimmer	Conductor
2017	Detroit	James Newton Howard	Conductor
2017	Breathe	Nitin Sawhney	Conductor
2017	Kingsman: The Golden Circle	Henry Jackman; Matthew Margeson	Conductor
2018	Early Man	Harry Gregson-Williams; Tom Howe	Conductor
2018	Charming	Tom Howe	Conductor
2018	Solo: A Star Wars Story	John Powell; John Williams	Conductor
2018	The Predator	Henry Jackman	Conductor
2018	Smallfoot	Heitor Pereira	Conductor
2018	Mary Poppins Returns	Marc Shaiman	Conductor
2019	How to Train Your Dragon: The Hidden World	John Powell	Conductor
2019	Pokémon: Detective Pikachu	Henry Jackman	Conductor
2019	Brightburn	Timothy Williams	Conductor
2019	Dora and the Lost City of Gold	John Debney; Germaine Franco	Conductor
2019	Judy	Gabriel Yared	Conductor
2019	6 Underground	Lorne Balfe	Conductor
2020	The Witches	Alan Silvestri	Conductor
2020	Black Beauty	Guillaume Roussel	Conductor
2020	The Midnight Sky	Alexandre Desplat	Conductor
2020	Wonder Woman 1984	Hans Zimmer	Conductor
2020	News of the World	James Newton Howard	Conductor
2021	Zack Snyder's Justice League	Tom Holkenborg	Conductor
2021	Black Widow	Lorne Balfe	Conductor
2021	The Boss Baby: Family Business	Hans Zimmer; Steve Mazzaro	Conductor
2021	Shang-Chi and the Legend of the Ten Rings	Joel P. West	Conductor
2022	Ambulance	Lorne Balfe	Conductor
2022	Fantastic Beasts: The Secrets of Dumbledore	James Newton Howard	Conductor
2022	Shin Ultraman	Shiro Sagisu	Conductor
2022	Don't Worry Darling	John Powell	Additional Score Conductor
2022	Spirited	Dominic Lewis (score); Benj Pasek & Justin Paul (songs)	Score Conductor
2022	Puss in Boots: The Last Wish	Heitor Pereira	Conductor
2023	Are You There God? It's Me, Margaret	Hans Zimmer	Conductor
2023	The Little Mermaid	Alan Menken	Conductor (songs)
2023	Gridman Universe	Shiro Sagisu	Conductor
2023	The Creator	Hans Zimmer	Conductor
2023	Mission: Impossible – Dead Reckoning Part One	Additional Conductor (London)	
2023	Migration	John Powell	Conductor
2023	Rebel Moon	Tom Holkenborg	Conductor
2024	Kung Fu Panda 4	Hans Zimmer; Steve Mazzaro	Conductor
2024	Damsel	David Fleming	Conductor
2024	The Fall Guy	Dominic Lewis	
2024	Ultraman: Rising	Scot Stafford	
2024	Wicked	John Powell; Stephen Schwartz	Conductor (incidental score)
2024	Sonic the Hedgehog 3	Tom Holkenborg	Conductor
2025	How to Train Your Dragon	John Powell	Conductor
2025	The Roses	Theodore Shapiro	Conductor
2025	The Lost Bus	James Newton Howard	Conductor

=== Video games ===
Year	Title	Studio(s)	Composer(s)	Notes
2014	Destiny	Bungie	Martin O'Donnell; Michael Salvatori	Conductor
2014	Castlevania: Lords of Shadow 2	MercurySteam; Konami	Oscar Araujo	Conductor
2015	Halo 5: Guardians	343 Industries; Microsoft Studios	Kazuma Jinnouchi	Conductor
2016	Uncharted 4: A Thief's End	Naughty Dog; Sony Interactive Entertainment	Henry Jackman	Conductor
2017	Uncharted: The Lost Legacy	Naughty Dog; Sony Interactive Entertainment	Henry Jackman	Conductor
2018	Dissidia Final Fantasy NT	Koei Tecmo; Square Enix; Team Ninja	Takeharu Ishimoto; Keiji Kawamori; Tsuyoshi Sekito	Conductor
2018	Marvel's Spider-Man	Insomniac Games; Sony Interactive Entertainment	John Paesano	Conductor
2019	Star Wars Jedi: Fallen Order	Respawn Entertainment; Electronic Arts	Stephen Barton; Gordy Haab	Conductor
2022	God of War Ragnarök	Santa Monica Studio; Sony Interactive Entertainment	Bear McCreary	Conductor
2023	Star Wars Jedi: Survivor	Respawn Entertainment; Electronic Arts	Stephen Barton; Gordy Haab	Conductor
2024	Indiana Jones and the Great Circle	MachineGames; Bethesda Softworks	Gordy Haab	Conductor
2025	Battlefield 6	Battlefield Studios; Electronic Arts	Henry Jackman	Conductor
