= Peter Maddocks =

English cartoonist (1928–2024)

Peter Maddocks (1 April 1928 – 20 November 2024) was an English cartoonist.

Maddocks contributed to many of the United Kingdom's leading daily and Sunday national papers with cartoon series such as Four D. Jones in the Daily Express in the late 1950s and early 1960s. He also created three children's animated series for the BBC in the 1980s: The Family-Ness, Jimbo and the Jet-Set and Penny Crayon.

He continued with many more publications through cartoons and short stories.

== Life and career ==
Maddocks was born in Birmingham on 1 April 1928. In 1939 he won a scholarship to the city's Moseley School of Art, where he was taught by Norman Pett. At the age of 15, Maddocks decided to leave school and join the Merchant Navy from 1943 to 1949.

After his six years in the Navy, Maddocks set up his own advertising agency, for which he designed cinema posters and wrote western series. He produced his first cartoons for the Daily Sketch from 1953 to 1954. From 1955 to 1965 he worked for the Daily Express, for which he created his comic strip Four D. Jones. In this comic, a cowboy travelled in the fourth dimension. This comic was a success for ten years for the Sunday Express. He later became the Cartoon Editor for Express Newspapers from 1965 to 1966, and from 1968 to 1971 he was the Special Features Editor of King magazine. Maddocks' characters tended to have google eyes with splayed out fingers. He also drew the satirical comic Nr. 10 about British politics.

Maddocks died from a short illness on 20 November 2024, at the age of 96.

== Contributions ==
Maddocks made contributions to the following:

- Daily Star
- Daily Record
- Manchester Evening News
- Mail on Sunday
- Private Eye
- Daily Mirror
- Daily Telegraph
- Evening Standard
- Evening News
- Sunday Telegraph
- Mayfair
- Woman's Own

== Filmography ==
Year	Title	Channel	Credit
1984–1985	The Family-Ness	BBC One	Creator
1986–1987	Jimbo and The Jet-Set	Children's BBC	Creator
1989–1990	Penny Crayon	Children's BBC	Creator
1995-1998	The Caribou Kitchen	Children's ITV	Artistic Director
1995-1998	The Caribou Kitchen	Children's ITV	Storyboards
