= The Family-Ness =

British cartoon television series

- Created by: Peter Maddocks
- Voices of: Peter Hawkins; Susan Sheridan
- Country of origin: United Kingdom
- No. of episodes: 25

Production
- Executive producer: Maddocks Animation
- Running time: 5 mins
- Production company: Maddocks Animation

Original release
- Network: BBC One
- Release: 1984 – 1985

Related
- Jimbo and the Jet-Set; Penny Crayon

The Family-Ness is a British cartoon series first produced in 1983. It was originally broadcast on BBC One from late 1984 to early 1985, with repeats airing throughout most of the 1990s and early 2000s, eventually ending with a short run on CBeebies on BBC Two between 11 and 22 February 2002. It was created by Peter Maddocks of Maddocks Cartoon Productions. Maddocks later went on to produce Penny Crayon and Jimbo and the Jet-Set in a similar style. Family-Ness was about the adventures of a family of Loch Ness Monsters and the MacToot family, particularly siblings Elspeth and Angus. The 'Nessies' could be called from the loch by the two children by means of their "thistle whistles".

The series was followed with a large collection of merchandising including annuals, story books, character models and even a record. The single "You'll Never Find a Nessie in the Zoo" was written by Roger and Gavin Greenaway, but never made it into the Top 40.

== Characters ==
=== Humans ===
Mr MacToot
Apparently the single parent to Angus and Elspeth (their mother is never seen or mentioned). A Scotsman, he has ginger hair with a bushy beard, and he plays the bagpipes. He is the keeper of the loch, but never sees a Loch Ness Monster, and when anyone mentions seeing one, he says it is "stuff and nonsense". He also happily thinks it's the wind whenever he hears a thistle whistle and even in one episode tells another that he hears this sound once in a while.
Angus MacToot
Seemingly older than his sister, Angus is adventurous, clever and quick and is usually successful in getting his father or one or several of the Nessies out of trouble when he needs to, though he sometimes underestimates the initiative of his sister. Angus’s design originally appeared in Peter Maddocks’ 1983 book The Sneezing Whale.
Elspeth MacToot
A friendly young girl who assists her brother in most of his adventures. Like Angus, her design originated in The Sneezing Whale.
Sergeant MacFuzz
The person most frequently approached when a Loch Ness Monster is seen. However, he seldom believes it – in the first episode because it was April Fool's Day, on another occasion because a monster was reported to be water skiing (which was in fact the truth) and other occasions simply because he arrives too late to see anything himself. He has a bully-like son, Willie MacFuzz, who also once saw a Loch Ness Monster, but he didn't believe him either.
Mrs McToffee
The keeper of the local sweet shop who is nevertheless careful not to sell too many sweets to young buyers in case they ruin their teeth.
Mayor and Mayoress
The chief figures of Loch Ness; the former is called upon to host various local events. The couple are oblivious to the Nessies, even when one of them is actually in front of them, standing in for a Loch Ness Monster's lookalike competition.
Professor Dumkopf
A slightly mad scientist and hot air balloon pilot with a German accent who is set on proving the Loch Ness Monster's existence. He often does see one, but is always thwarted in proving it to anyone else either by the MacToot children or by the Nessies themselves (or both). He has tried every bizarre method imaginable to succeed in his aim: from lowering a telescopic camera into the loch, to setting up a haggis-and-chips bait trap. The name Dumkopf means "stupid head" in German. The name was later used in an episode of Inspector Gadget for an unrelated character who was also, coincidentally, a mad scientist.

=== Nessies ===
Most of the Nessies have aptronymic names. With one exception, the Nessies appear as very fat, yellowish dinosaurs with bulbous noses and bear little likeness to the stereotypical plesiosaurus/serpent appearance.

Ferocious-Ness
The first Loch Ness Monster to interact with the MacToot children, and subsequently the most frequent to appear in the series. A large, khaki crocodile/dragon-like creature who likes frightening tourists and passers-by, but is otherwise generally friendly and kind. He is able to change colour to blend in with his background when on land (only seen in one episode) and can, when this happens, get stuck in whatever colour he chooses, but can be made to change back if confronted with something more frightening than himself, creepy-crawlies being his greatest fear.
Her High-Ness
The Queen of the Nessies, she originally made the rule that humans must not have dealings with Loch Ness Monsters, but when she saw how polite and helpful the children were, she made them the exception to the rule, and presented them with secret thistle whistles, to call them when necessary. She was seen to breathe fire in just one episode, which she learned to do from "a cousin in China", and on another occasion she stowed away in a ship to visit said relative. She bears little physical similarities with the other Nessies, having the appearance of a stereotypical Loch Ness monster.
Baby-Ness
The youngest Nessie with a dummy and nappy. He ironically has a "sweet tooth" despite not yet teething, as demonstrated once when Forgetful-Ness lost him, resulting in his crawling into the back door of Mrs McToffee's sweet shop to steal sweeties, and on another occasion when he had the measles and Angus and Elspeth bought him a whole jar of sticky sweets to cheer him up.
Careful-Ness
An excessively cautious Nessie.
Clever-Ness
The most intelligent of the Nessies, who sports a fine pair of spectacles. Slightly old and doddering, but if called upon to assist the MacToot children in any way is usually successful in doing so.
Clumsy-Ness
A well-meaning but accident-prone Nessie who wears a jumper and a winter hat. He was hit on the head by a boat, which caused him to stagger across a nearby sea scout camp and squash the tents.
Eager-Ness
A slightly hyperactive Nessie who can get carried away, but is useful if the children want something done swiftly.
Forgetful-Ness
A tie-wearing Nessie who, when he does call the children, sometimes even forgets that it was he who called. Having lost and then retrieved Baby Ness with the help of Angus and Elspeth, he remembered to express his gratitude but forgot what the baby's name was.
Eyewit-Ness
Monster with a patch over one eye, who looks like a pirate. He has a tendency to place his telescope over the wrong eye.
Grumpy-Ness
An old grumbling Nessie who is the least grateful to hear and react to Angus and Elspeth's thistle-whistles, and perhaps for that reason is one of the least often seen.
Tidy-Ness
Helps clean up the camp that was accidentally destroyed by Clumsy-Ness.
Heavy-Ness
Strong monster, who wears circus "strong man" outfits. Teams up with Mighty Ness to pull Silly Ness free when he gets stuck.
Lovely-Ness
The only female Nessie apart from her High Ness. She has long, blonde hair. A friendly Nessie, but often too dainty to help physically in a great deal of the adventures, and is therefore not often seen, though she does appear during the title credits.
Mighty-Ness
Another strong monster dressed in Circus Strongman clothes, and often seen with Heavy Ness.
Naughty-Ness
A trouble causing monster.
Silly-Ness
Dim monster that's always getting into trouble. Often gets stuck in small holes and caves and was the first Nessie the children saw- albeit with his backside up in the air.
Speedy-Ness
After Eager-Ness, generally the quickest to action, he is distinguished by his red crash helmet.
Sporty-Ness
Appears in the opening credits, but seldom reacts to the MacToot children's thistle-whistles. When he does appear he tends to show off. He is shown wearing a red and white striped T-shirt.
Hungry-Ness
A big Nessie who will eat anything, even diving bells.
Comfy Ness
A puffy pink Nessie who cushioned Angus when he fell from a loose kite.
Thirsty-Ness
A Nessie who seems to be in a constantly dehydrated state. He even drank a potion that made his bottom half disappear.

There are many unnamed Nessies used as background characters.

== Credits ==
Written and Created by
Peter Maddocks
Voices by
Peter Hawkins, Susan Sheridan
Music by
Roger and Gavin Greenaway
Theme Tune Performed By
Roger Greenaway
Animation by
The Animation People, Gingerbread Animation Ltd, Bill Melendez Productions, T.V Cartoons Ltd, Bob Godfrey Ltd, The Ness Company
Head of Backgrounds
Kevin Smith
Layout
Ted Pettengel and David Elvin
Production by
Peter Maddocks, Nick Roberts, Gus Angus
Series Director
Jack Stokes
Dubbing by
MagMasters

== Episodes ==
No.	Title	Original release date
1	"Elspeth and Angus Meet the Loch Ness Monster"	5 October 1984
Whilst Elspeth and Angus are playing down by the Loch side they spot a large mound, only it isn't a mound, it's Silly-Ness, who's always getting stuck in holes. For helping to rescue Silly-Ness, the Queen Nessy gives the children two "Thistle Whistles" (The thistle being the symbol of Scotland). Whenever they need help they can just call on the Nessies. So they blow the whistles and we see just how many Nessies there really are in the Loch.
2	"Professor Dumpkopf's Underwater Telescope"	12 October 1984
Professor Dumkopf is up to his old tricks searching for the Loch Ness Monster, this time with an underwater telescope dangling from a balloon. Scared that Silly Ness might give the game away the children call on the Nessies to warn them. Fortunately Ferocious-Ness – the original Loch Ness monster comes to their aid.
3	"Elspeth and Angus Buy a Puppy"	19 October 1984
A gypsy (Mr Tinker) is passing the loch, and Elspeth and Angus are appalled that he has a poor wee dog attached to the caravan who is being made to run alongside. They ask the gypsy if they can have the puppy, and he says they can buy it. As they don't have enough money Eager-Ness searches on the bottom of the loch for coins. Most of what he drags up are bottle tops, however there is one gold coin.
4	"Ferocious-ness Changes His Colour"	26 October 1984
Ferocious Ness likes to hide in bushes and scare passers by – that is until he shows off the fact he can change colour and finds he can't change back again. It's up to Angus and Elspeth to hide him until he does (before Sergeant McFuzz, Mr McTout and the two frightened firemen return).
5	"Ferocious-Ness and the Look-Alike Contest"	2 November 1984
When Ferocious-Ness happens to sit on the children's model of the Loch Ness Monster, he has to take its place in the monster look-alike competition. And gets very annoyed when he doesn't win since the Mayor and Mayoress give the third prize for the MacToot kids who have their nice try! and then when Ferocious-Ness goes back in the Loch, he scares the Mayoress by waving at her on the ferris wheel.
6	"Clever-ness Helps with the Homework"	9 November 1984
When the two children struggle with their maths homework, Clever-Ness helps them work out their problems, during the session Mr and Mrs Flashback take a photo for their local paper, the next morning Mr MacToot is pleased when their homework is done but a bit angry when he sees the monsters hand photo in his article on the paper.
7	"Speedy-Ness Saves the Day"	16 November 1984
Mr McTout enters the local Bagpipe competition, but when he gets on the bus forgets to take his bagpipes with him. Only Speedy-Ness can help, along with an enthusiastic Sporty-Ness to scare four fishermen away to get Sergeant McFuzz (by phoning him to tell a truthful joke) then Elspeth and Angus finally get to the bagpipe contest to give their father his bagpipes at last
8	"Ferocious-Ness Loses His Roar"	23 November 1984
When Elspeth and Angus find Ferocious-Ness hiding in the bushes squeaking to himself (after scaring a lorry driver away to the McTout Cottage), they help the queen prepare a soothing concoction to help his throat with a honey and lemons cure to bring his roar back to scare the four picnickers away.
9	"Baby-Ness Gets the Measles"	30 November 1984
Elspeth and Angus can't find the Nessies, until they spot Careful-Ness hiding in the woods. It turns out Baby-Ness has given them all measles. The two children go to buy sticky sweets to cheer Baby-Ness up, but on their way they are spotted by nasty Willie McFuzz, son of Sergeant McFuzz, and his friend Tubby. The two follow Elspeth and Angus to steal their sweets – not bargaining for finding a huge spotty monster at the end!
10	"Silly-Ness and the Bubble Machine"	7 December 1984
Professor Dumkopf has created a bubble machine that will capture the Nessies, so Angus and Elspeth must team up with Grumpy Ness to save them.
11	"Ferocious-Ness and the Sound Machine"	14 December 1984
Ferocious-Ness is trapped underneath a frozen Loch Ness, right as Professor Dumkopf is enacting another plan to capture the Nessies.
12	"Clever-Ness and the Curling Championship"	21 December 1984
Mr MacToot is competing in a curling competition, but has to square up against a strong opponent.
13	"The Maze of Urquhart Castle"	3 January 1985
A TV director joins the MacToot family in navigating a maze.
14	"Professor Dumkopf Makes a Monster Film"	10 January 1985
Professor Dumkopf supervises the film Sherlock Holmes meets the Loch Ness Monster, using a prop very similar to Ferocious-Ness.
15	"Professor Dumkopf and his Amazing Cannonball"	17 January 1985
Professor Dumkopf creates an underwater missile to take a picture of the Loch Ness Monster.
16	"Sporty-Ness and the Highland Games"	24 January 1985
Mr MacToot competes in the Highland Games against Heck McBraun.
17	"Hungry-Ness and the Diving Bell"	31 January 1985
Mr McTout has just given the Royal Navy permission to test a new diving bell in Loch Ness and the Navy expedition's shortest member, Lieutenant McSquirt, is to make the descent into the Loch. Fearing for the Nessies' safety, Angus and Elspeth try to warn their friends with the Thistle Whistles, but end up summoning Hungry-Ness, who mistakes the diving bell for food and puts it in his mouth. Fortunately, McSquirt thinks he's in a cave until he punches Hungry-Ness' uvula and when the Captain claims to have seen the Loch Ness Monster, McSquirt can't confirm the sighting as a result of being too dizzy from being spat out by Hungry-Ness.
18	"Professor Dumkopf and the Hungry Monster"	7 February 1985
Professor Dumkopf prepares a warm meal to attract the Nessies.
19	"Clumsy-Ness Upsets Captain Standfast"	14 February 1985
At Angus’s boy scouts, Clumsy-Ness causes havoc.
20	"Angus and the Monster Kite"	21 February 1985
Professor Dumkopf creates a kite resembling Ferocious-Ness to lure him.
21	"Captain Standfast and the Golden Key"	28 February 1985
Captain Steadfast unknowingly steals Her High-Ness’s Golden Key.
22	"Thirsty-Ness and the Part-Time Witch"	7 March 1985
Elspeth and Angus discover a path leading to a hidden cottage. They meet a part-time witch – she's also a bus conductor. She is trying to make an invisibility spell, but is having not much luck, as she is missing an essential ingredient – a spot from the tail of the Loch Ness monster. Elspeth and Angus go and call on Ferocious-Ness, who gives them a spot from his arm. The witch tries the potion but finds that only her bottom half disappears, as the spot wasn't from the tail. She decides to give up on magic and tips her cauldron over, the liquid pouring into the loch. Thirsty-Ness appears and having drunk the water promptly disappears – well half of him anyway!
23	"Baby-Ness and the Mayor's Statue"	14 March 1985
Baby-Ness goes missing again, and ends up unveiling a statue of the Mayor.
24	"Captain Standfast and the Stowaway"	21 March 1985
Her-Highness decides to pay a visit to her cousin in China and stows away on Captain Standfast's boat headed out to sea. Unfortunately she forgets her handbag and it's up to the Children to get it before the boat leaves dock.
25	"You'll Never Find a Nessie in the Zoo"	28 March 1985
Elspeth and Angus spot a poster in the village for a Zoo visiting Inverness, and go to see it passing through the village. At the end Ferocious Ness waves a grateful goodbye to Angus and Elspeth.: This episode included the full version of the show's ending theme song "You'll Never See a Nessie in the Zoo" as the show's music video.

== Home releases ==
In the middle of 1985 after the final episode of The Family Ness was broadcast, BBC Video released one video with 14 episodes of the entire show.

VHS video title	Year of release	Episodes
The Family Ness: Monster Tales from Loch Ness (BBCV 4012)	7 October 1985	"Elspeth and Angus Meet the Loch Ness Monster"; "Professor Dumkopf and his Underwater Telescope"; "Clumsy-Ness upsets Captain Standfast"; "Silly-Ness and the Bubble Machine"; "Professor Dumkopf and his Amazing Cannonball"; "Ferocious-Ness changes colour"; "Captain Standfast and the Stowaway"; "Baby-Ness gets the Measles"; "Ferocious-Ness and the Sound Machine"; "Hungry-Ness and the Diving Bell"; "Thirsty-Ness and the Part-Time Witch"; "Professor Dumkopf makes a Monster Film"; "The Maze of Urquhart Castle"; "You'll never find a Nessie in the Zoo"

In the mid-1990s Hallmark and Carlton Home Entertainment released one video with the first 9 episodes of 1984.

VHS video title	Year of release	Episodes
The Family Ness: As Seen on TV (3007340133)	1994	"Elspeth and Angus Meet the Loch Ness Monster"; "Professor Dumpkopf's Underwater Telescope"; "Elspeth and Angus Buy a Puppy"; "Ferocious-Ness Changes His Colour"; "Ferocious-Ness and the Look-a-Like Contest"; "Clever-Ness Helps with the Homework"; "Speedy-Ness Saves the Day"; "Ferocious-Ness Loses His Roar"; "Baby-Ness Gets the Measles"

In 2002, Right Entertainment (distributed through Universal Pictures (UK) Ltd) released two videos with eight episodes on each one and then in Summer 2004 they were both re-released on 2 DVD releases.

VHS/DVD video title	Year of release/ Catalogue Number (VHS)	Year of release/ Catalogue Number (DVD)	Episodes
The Family Ness: Elspeth and Angus Meet the Loch Ness Monster and other stories	23 September 2002	2004 (8223994)	"Elspeth and Angus Meet the Loch Ness Monster"; "Elspeth and Angus Buy a Puppy"; "Speedy-Ness Saves the Day"; "Professor Dumpkopf's Underwater Telescope"; "Ferocious-Ness Loses His Roar"; "Clumsy-Ness Upsets Captain Standfast"; "Clever-Ness helps with the Homework"; "Silly-Ness and the Bubble Machine
The Family Ness: The Look-A-Like Contest and other stories	16 June 2003	2004 (8228102)	"The Look-A-Like Contest"; "Professor Dumkopf and his Amazing Cannonball"; "Baby-Ness and the Mayor's Statue"; "Ferocious-Ness Changes Colour"; "Captain Stanfast and the Stowaway"; "Baby-Ness Gets the Measles"; "Ferocious-Ness and the Sound Machine"; "Clever-Ness and the Curling Championship"
