= Jimbo and the Jet-Set =

British animated television series (1986–1987)

- Jimbo
- Created by: Peter Maddocks
- Written by: Peter Maddocks
- Directed by: Keith Learner
- Voices of: Peter Hawkins; Susan Sheridan
- Narrated by: Peter Hawkins
- Composers: Gavin Greenaway; Roger Greenaway
- Country of origin: United Kingdom
- Original language: English
- No. of episodes: 25

Production
- Executive producer: Graham Clutterbuck
- Producer: Peter Maddocks
- Cinematography: Chris Williams
- Animators: Clive Dawson; Julian Gibbs; Wil Mobberley; Neil Salmon
- Editor: Keith Learner
- Running time: 5 minutes
- Production company: Maddocks Cartoon Productions

Original release
- Network: BBC One
- Release: 6 January 1986 – 6 February 1987

Related
- Penny Crayon; The Family-Ness

Jimbo and the Jet-Set is a British animated cartoon series centered on the eponymous Jimbo, an anthropomorphic aeroplane. The series, created by Peter Maddocks and produced by Maddocks Cartoon Productions, aired for 25 episodes from 6 January 1986 until 6 February 1987, and succeeded his prior creation The Family-Ness.

== Characters ==
Jimbo
The titular protagonist. As stated in its first episode, Jimbo was originally intended to be a Jumbo Jet. However, as his designer had never known the difference between inches and centimetres, Jimbo was designed with a diminutive size.
Chief Controller
The short-tempered manager of the fictional "London Airport", who frequently ends episodes exclaiming "Jimbo, I want words with you… JIMBO!"
Tommy Tow-Truck
Jimbo’s best friend. He sometimes comes to his rescue, and is adored by Amanda Baggage.
Phil Fuel-Truck
Supplies Jimbo’s fuel, and is considered a vital member alongside Tommy Tow-Truck and Amanda Baggage.
Amanda Baggage
A yellow baggage truck who is responsible for carrying visitors' luggage.
Freddie Fire Truck
He is introduced when Captain Squirt arrives at London Airport to drop him off and demonstrate fire safety. He is then used to handle fires that break out.
Old Timer
A Vickers Wellington who is the most frequent guest character. He is usually used in air shows.
Gloria
A female counterpart to Jimbo, who comes from Hawaii.

== Credits ==
Created, Written and Produced by
Peter Maddocks
Music
Roger Greenaway, Gavin Greenaway
Series Animation by
Clive Dawson, Julian Gibbs, Neil Salmon, William Mobberley
Backgrounds
Kevin Smith
Camera
Chris Williams
Editing
Keith Learner
Trace & Paint
Guy Maddocks, Vivienne Dempsey, Simon Maddocks
Directed by
Keith Learner
Voices
Peter Hawkins & Susan Sheridan

== Episodes ==
No.	Title	Original release date
1	"The Little Big Problem"	6 January 1986
The origin of how Jimbo came to be starts out at the aircraft factory, where the technicians use centimetres instead of inches, resulting in "half a Jumbo".
2	"Trouble at Sea"	7 January 1986
One day whilst crossing the Atlantic, Jimbo sees a ship in distress and frantically does all he can to gather help to save it.
3	"First Time Fliers"	8 January 1986
Jimbo is to take a class of children on their first ever flight. Despite the Chief's warnings to behave, Jimbo gives the kids a ride they'll never forget—much to their poor teacher's displeasure.
4	"The U.F.O"	13 January 1986
One stormy evening, Jimbo claims to have seen a flying saucer hovering above London Airport. The Chief thinks he is playing another joke until he experiences a "Close Encounter".
5	"April Fools Day"	14 January 1986
On April Fools' Day, the Chief's birthday ironically comes as he has a bit of fun with Jimbo whilst testing out fire safety with Captain Squirt of the fire department. However, Jimbo gets the last laugh.
6	"The Old Timer"	15 January 1986
One misty day, Jimbo comes across a Wellington bomber plane (the Old Timer) who has lost his way in the fog. Jimbo offers to guide him home but weather (rain, snow and fog) constantly causes the pair to be diverted to one airfield after another.
7	"The Royal Visitors"	20 January 1986
The Chief flies everyone in a blind panic when he hears word that royal visitors are due to arrive at the airfield.
8	"Jet Lag"	21 January 1986
Jimbo suffers jet lag after an uncomfortable flight. The Flying Doctor has to get Jimbo to gain his confidence in order to fly again; but when all his methods fail, Tommy Towtruck suggests a bold solution.
9	"Every Silver Lining Has a Cloud"	22 January 1986
Jimbo is low on fuel and wants to get home but finds himself in a "queue" with other planes waiting to land. With help from a large cloud, Jimbo pretends to be Concorde in order to slip in quietly, which causes great confusion at London Airport.
10	"Holiday Weather"	27 January 1986
Fed up with the cold and wet in Britain, Jimbo flies to Hawaii for his holiday for some fun in the sun. However, all is well until a volcano erupts.
11	"Winter Wonderland"	28 January 1986
Jimbo is sent to take champion skiers to Switzerland for an important championship and shows off a few of his own skills.
12	"Jimbo Down-Under"	29 January 1986
Jimbo, tired and weary after a long flight, accidentally lands in the middle of the Australian outback. However, he is rescued by a fellow Australian and a herd of kangaroos.
13	"Jimbo and the Astronaut"	3 February 1986
Flying a little too high, Jimbo finds himself out in outer space, where he helps a stranded astronaut back to Earth.
14	"Jungle Jimbo"	4 February 1986
An airport in Africa begins using computer technology to keep things running. Jimbo realises how useful computers and elephants are when he helps to put out a forest fire.
15	"Jimbo and the Whale"	5 February 1986
Jimbo's engines are acting up as he flies over the North Pole, causing him to become stranded. He gets airborne again with help from a whale.
16	"Bermuda Triangle"	10 February 1986
Jimbo is to escort the Old Timer to a wartime convention in Miami, Florida, but the two end up becoming trapped in the mysterious Bermuda Triangle and find themselves in World War II.
17	"The Chief Gets a Rocket"	11 February 1986
Jimbo is sent on a top secret mission to help with the launching of a rocket. The Chief, control tower and all, are also sent to launch it, but they end up launching the control tower by mistake.
18	"The Controller's Apprentice"	12 February 1986
The Chief brings along his nephew to teach him how to be a proper airfield chief, much to Jimbo's dismay, but the apprentice's cockiness becomes his downfall.
19	"Chinese Pandamonium"	17 February 1986
Jimbo is sent, along with an animal trainer, to try and capture a rare panda from China. Meanwhile he is disguised as a panda as camouflage, much to his embarrassment. However, the Chief ends up laughing on the other side of his face when Jimbo returns with a live Chinese dragon.
20	"The Pennand Inca Story"	18 February 1986
Jimbo sets off with a tropical explorer to find an ancient ink well that writes with pure gold. However, the result is not entirely successful.
21	"Quiet Please"	24 February 1986
A little old lady who lives near the runways is complaining about the noise, which means that Jimbo's engines become increasingly muffled.
22	"Jinglebells Jimbo"	23 December 1986
When Father Christmas' sleigh is stolen, Jimbo is sent to help deliver presents all over the world in time for Christmas.
23	"The Great Air Race"	17 January 1987
A round-the-world air race is set and Jimbo wishes he could take part. He gets his chance when he has to hurry the race judge to the finishing line when he arrives at the start by mistake. Low on fuel, Jimbo relies on rocket power to get to the finish in time.
24	"The Little Red Devil"	23 January 1987
A special display of Red Devil Planes are prepared for a retiring Admiral, but when one of them becomes unavailable, Tommy Towtruck tries to masquerade Jimbo to look like one of them. However, the paint is not entirely waterproof when a storm breaks.
25	"The Computer Clanger"	6 February 1987
The Airfield Administration decide to build another "Jimbo" for their fleet and to avert another mishap, the Aircraft Factory decide to build the new plane using computers – only this time, they mistake centimetres for yards.

== Home media ==
In 1987, after its debut on the BBC, twelve episodes were released on BBC Video, then reissued by 'Paradox Films' which distributed Total Home Entertainment with under licence from BBC Worldwide Ltd (Cat. No. THE 20003) in 1995.

VHS video title	Year of release	Episodes
Jimbo and the Jet-Set 1 (BBCV 4074)	13 July 1987	"The Little Big Problem"; "First Time Fliers"; "The Old Timer"; "Jimbo Down-Under"; "April Fools Day"; "Jimbo and the Whale"; "The Chief Gets a Rocket"; "Jungle Jimbo"; "Chinese Pandamonium"; "Trouble at Sea"; "Quiet Please"; "Jinglebells Jimbo"

In 1999, Castle Home Video released all 25 episodes on two videos, but reissued on DVD by Right Entertainment (distributed by Universal Pictures UK) in 2004 since Castle's VHS versions became out of print in 2002.

VHS video title	Year of release / Cat. No. (VHS)	Year of release / Cat. No. (DVD)	Episodes
Jimbo and the Jet-Set: The Royal Visitors	14 June 1999 (CHV 2015)	2004 (8228105)	"The Royal Visitors"; "First Time Fliers"; "Holiday Weather"; "Every Silver Lining Has a Cloud"; "Jet Lag"; "Trouble at Sea"; "The Old Timer"; "Winter Wonderland"; "April Fools Day"; "The U.F.O"
Jimbo and the Jet-Set: The Little Big Problem	14 June 1999 (CHV 2016)	2004 (8223728)	"The Little Big Problem"; "Bermuda Triangle"; "Jimbo and the Whale"; "Jungle Jimbo"; "Jimbo and the Astronaut"; "Jimbo Down-Under"; "Quiet Please"; "The Chief Gets a Rocket"; "The Controller's Apprentice"; "Jinglebells Jimbo"; "The Pennand Inca Story"; "The Great Air Race"; "The Little Red Devil"; "Chinese Pandamonium"; "The Computer Clanger"
