= Penny Crayon =

British animated cartoon series (1989–90)

- Created by: Peter Maddocks
- Voices of: Su Pollard; Peter Hawkins
- Opening theme: "Penny Crayon"
- Ending theme: "Penny Crayon" (Instrumental)
- Country of origin: United Kingdom
- No. of series: 1
- No. of episodes: 12

Production
- Running time: 10 minutes per episode (approx.)
- Production companies: Maddocks Animation; Parkfield Publishing

Original release
- Network: BBC1
- Release: 14 September 1989 – 1 October 1990

Related
- Jimbo and the Jet-Set; The Family-Ness

Penny Crayon is a 1989 British animated children's television series that tells the adventures of a very intellectual and well-meaning (but occasionally mischievous) schoolgirl from London who loves to draw, and her escapades accompanied by her best friend, Dennis. Using the magic crayons that she always carries with her, she brings everything that she ever draws to life, to either help them on their adventures or to get them out of tricky situations, and usually creating a world of chaos until it is either erased or washed away.

The origin of Penny's crayons is never explained or hinted at in the series; however, series creator Peter Maddocks released a prequel story, along with an adaptation of the episode "Dickens of a Mess", in digital format in 2012, which told the story of how Penny came to have her magic crayons.

== Characters ==
- Penny Crayon is a highly intelligent and resourceful schoolgirl, with a Northern accent and who loves drawing. She has magic crayons and pencils that can draw on any surface including brick walls, cave interiors and even the inside of a whale's mouth. She is voiced by comedy actress Su Pollard, whose face Penny visually resembles.
- Dennis Pillbeam (his surname is never given on-screen but is mentioned in literature accompanying the series) is Penny's best friend, an excitable, good-natured yet simple boy who can often be heard praising Penny's cleverness or bravery. He was the only other regular character in the series, voiced by Peter Hawkins, who had also done voice-work for Maddocks Animation's previous television series.

== Origin and production ==
Penny Crayon was produced for the BBC in the United Kingdom. first broadcast weekly as part of Children's BBC on BBC1 from 14 September 1989. It was made by Maddocks Animation, which had previously produced Jimbo and the Jet-Set and The Family-Ness, and utilized much of the same production staff, as well as featuring the vocal talents of Peter Hawkins in all three series. Maddocks had originally planned to succeed Jimbo with a similar show entitled Billy Kit-Car, though the Corporation preferred Penny Crayon as it featured a female protagonist that could be voiced by Su Pollard.

Twelve episodes were produced in a single production run, although spread across two separate broadcast runs in 1989 and 1990 respectively. The series was subsequently repeated a number of times, airing into the early 2000s and was also later repeated on GMTV2 with Bertha.

Penny Crayon was originally created by Maddocks as a gag comic in the girls' magazine Jinty in 1975. In animation, the character was introduced in 1988 in an early episode of Playdays (broadcast at that time under its original title of Playbus, and before the show's rotation of stories featuring recurring characters had fully set in place). In that story, not animated but read out over static images drawn by Peter Maddocks, when a school trip to the zoo is rained off, Penny tries to entertain her disappointed classmates stuck inside school by drawing zoo animals on the walls of the school hall (including a Tyrannosaurus rex), which come to life and cause havoc around the school. When she and Dennis can't catch them to erase them, she eventually draws a huge cage to put them all in, thus allowing her to rub them out. This early version of Penny had darker hair – she was given blonde hair in the following series to match that of Su Pollard, and both her and Dennis' appearance was modified for the subsequent series. One of Dennis' lines ("Mum will be furious when we get home and she hears about this!") suggests that Penny and Dennis might be siblings, though this was never mentioned in the series. The story was one of several submitted by independent writers for the new daily series, and although a selection of rotating story characters was soon picked for Playbus, it was well-enough received that then-Head of Children's Programmes Anna Home recommended that Maddocks might develop it as a series.

Due to the original Penny Crayon story appearing on Playbus, some episode guides to the series erroneously list thirteen episodes.

== Episodes ==
No.	Title	Original release date
1	"Tower of London"	14 September 1989
2	"The Cookery Class"	21 September 1989
3	"Circus Lion"	28 September 1989
Note: This was the first episode produced; and shares some story elements of the original Penny Crayon story read on Playbus.
4	"Amusement Park"	5 October 1989
5	"Waxworks Museum"	12 October 1989
6	"Pantomime"	19 October 1989
7	"Haunted House"	26 October 1989
8	"Silly Daydream"	2 November 1989
9	"Camping Holiday"	10 September 1990
10	"Treasure Hunt"	17 September 1990
11	"A Dickens of a Mess"	24 September 1990
12	"Dog Show"	1 October 1990

== Home releases ==
In 1989 and 1990, Parkfield Publishing released two video cassettes with four episodes on each one.

VHS video title	Year of release	Episodes
Penny Crayon: Volume 1 (MKC 0001)	1989	"The Circus Lion"; "Waxworks Museum"; "Cookery Class"; "Pantomime"
Penny Crayon: Volume 2 (MKC 0002)	1990	"Tower of London"; "Amusement Park"; "Camping Holiday"; "Treasure Hunt"

In 1992, TeleVideo (A division of Direct Entertainment Group) released three videos with four episodes on each tape.

VHS video title	Year of release	Episodes
The Adventures of Penny Crayon: Camping Holiday (TELVID 22)	1992	"Camping Holiday"; "Waxworks Museum"; "Haunted House"; "Cookery Class"
The Adventures of Penny Crayon: Dog Show (TELVID 23) (Note: Also released on DVD.)	1992	"Dog Show"; "A Dickens of a Mess"; "Pantomime"; "Tower of London"
The Adventures of Penny Crayon: Treasure Hunt (TELVID 24)	1992	"Treasure Hunt"; "Amusement Park"; "Circus Lion"; "Silly Daydream"

In 1994, Carlton Home Entertainment released a single video with only four episodes.

VHS video title	Year of release	Episodes
Penny Crayon: As Seen on TV (30073401430)	1994	"Camping Holiday"; "Waxworks Museum"; "Haunted House"; "The Cookery Class"

Several book adaptations and a 1990 annual were also released.
