= SpongeBob SquarePants (franchise) =

Nickelodeon media franchise

- Created by: Stephen Hillenburg
- Original work: SpongeBob SquarePants
- Owners: Nickelodeon Group (Skydance)
- Years: 1999–present

Print publications
- Books: List of books
- Comics: SpongeBob Comics

Films and television
- Films: List of films
- Animated series: SpongeBob SquarePants (1999–present); Kamp Koral: SpongeBob's Under Years (2021–2024); The Patrick Star Show (2021–present)

Theatrical presentations
- Musical: SpongeBob SquarePants: The Broadway Musical (2016)

Games
- Traditional: List of board and card games
- Video games: List of games

Audio
- Soundtracks: List of soundtracks

Miscellaneous
- Toys: List of toys
- Theme park attractions: SpongeBob SquarePants 4-D; SpongeBob SquarePants Rock Bottom Plunge; Pineapple Poppers; Dutchman's Deck Adventure Course; SpongeBob SquarePants 4D: The Great Jelly Rescue; Bikini Bottom Crosstown Express; SpongeBob's Jellyfish Jam; Sandy's Blasting Bronco; Barnacle Bus; Bobbing Barrels; Jellyfish Fields Jamboree; Mrs. Puff's Boating School

SpongeBob SquarePants, also known simply as SpongeBob, is an American media franchise created by marine science educator and animator Stephen Hillenburg and owned by the Nickelodeon Group. It began with the eponymous series, which premiered in 1999, and went on to become one of the longest-running American animated series. The franchise is the most profitable property for Paramount Consumer Products, having generated over $16 billion in merchandising revenue, making it one of the highest-grossing media franchises of all time.

The franchise is set in the fictional underwater city of Bikini Bottom and focuses on an anthropomorphic yellow sea sponge named SpongeBob, alongside an ensemble cast of other anthropomorphic aquatic creatures and their many adventures and endeavors.

== Development ==
=== Early inspirations ===
Creator Stephen Hillenburg first became fascinated with the ocean as a child and began developing his artistic abilities at a young age. Although these interests would not overlap for some time—the idea of drawing fish seemed boring to him—Hillenburg pursued both during college, majoring in marine biology and minoring in art. After graduating in 1984, he joined the Ocean Institute, an organization in Dana Point, California, dedicated to educating the public about marine science and maritime history.

While Hillenburg was there, his love of the ocean began to influence his artistry. He created a precursor to SpongeBob SquarePants: a comic book titled The Intertidal Zone used by the institute to teach visiting students about the animal life of tide pools. The comic starred various anthropomorphic sea lifeforms, many of which would evolve into SpongeBob SquarePants characters. Hillenburg tried to get the comic professionally published, but none of the companies he sent it to were interested.

A large inspiration to Hillenburg was Ween's 1997 album The Mollusk, which had a nautical and underwater theme. Hillenburg contacted the band shortly after the album's release, explaining the baseline ideas for SpongeBob SquarePants, and also requested a song from the band, which they sent on Christmas Eve. This song was "Loop de Loop", which was used in the episode "Your Shoe's Untied".

=== Conception ===
While working as a staff artist at the Ocean Institute, Hillenburg entertained plans to return eventually to college for a master's degree in art. Before this could materialize, he attended an animation festival, which inspired him to make a slight change in course. Instead of continuing his education with a traditional art program, Hillenburg chose to study experimental animation at the California Institute of the Arts. His thesis film, Wormholes, is about the theory of relativity. It was screened at festivals, and at one of these, Hillenburg met Joe Murray, creator of the popular Nickelodeon animated series, Rocko's Modern Life. Murray was impressed by the style of the film and offered Hillenburg a job. Hillenburg joined the series as a director, and later, during the fourth season, he took on the roles of producer and creative director.

Martin Olson, one of the writers for Rocko's Modern Life, read The Intertidal Zone and encouraged Hillenburg to create a television series with a similar concept. At that point, Hillenburg had not even considered creating his own series. However, he realized that if he ever did, this would be the best approach. He began to develop some of the characters from The Intertidal Zone, including the comic's "announcer", Bob the Sponge. He wanted his series to stand out from most popular cartoons of the time, which he felt were exemplified by buddy comedies like The Ren & Stimpy Show. As a result, Hillenburg decided to focus on a single main character: the "weirdest" sea creature he could think of. This led him to the sponge. The Intertidal Zone's Bob the Sponge resembles an actual sea sponge, and at first, Hillenburg continued to use this design. In determining the new character's behavior, Hillenburg drew inspiration from innocent, childlike figures that he enjoyed, such as Charlie Chaplin, Laurel and Hardy, Jerry Lewis, and Pee-wee Herman. He then considered modeling the character after a kitchen sponge and realized this idea would match the character's square personality perfectly. Patrick, Mr. Krabs, Pearl, and Squidward were the next characters Hillenburg created for the show.

To voice the series' central character, Hillenburg turned to Tom Kenny, whose career in animation had started alongside Hillenburg's on Rocko's Modern Life. Elements of Kenny's own personality were employed to develop the character further. Initially, Hillenburg wanted to use the name "SpongeBoy"—the character had no last name—and the series was to have been called SpongeBoy Ahoy!. However, the Nickelodeon legal department discovered—after voice acting had been completed for the original seven-minute pilot episode—that the name "SpongeBoy" was already in use for a mop product, and a character of the same name was already trademarked by Flaming Carrot Comics creator Bob Burden. In choosing a replacement name, Hillenburg felt he still had to use the word "Sponge", so that viewers would not mistake the character for a "Cheese Man". He settled on the name, "SpongeBob". "SquarePants" was chosen as a family name after Kenny saw a picture of the character and remarked, "Boy, look at this sponge in square pants, thinking he can get a job in a fast food place." When he heard Kenny say it Hillenburg loved the phrase and felt it would reinforce the character's nerdiness.

=== Assembling the crew ===
Derek Drymon, who served as creative director for the first three seasons, has said that Hillenburg wanted to surround himself with a "team of young and hungry people." Many of the major contributors to SpongeBob SquarePants had worked before with Hillenburg on Rocko's Modern Life: this included: Drymon, art director Nick Jennings, supervising director Alan Smart, writer / voice actor Doug Lawrence (often credited as Mr. Lawrence), and Tim Hill, who helped develop the series bible.

Although Drymon would go on to have a significant influence on SpongeBob SquarePants, he was not offered a role on the series initially. As a late recruit to Rocko's Modern Life, he had not established much of a relationship with Hillenburg before SpongeBob's conception. Hillenburg first sought out Drymon's storyboard partner, Mark O'Hare—but he had just created the soon-to-be syndicated comic strip, Citizen Dog. While he would later join SpongeBob as a writer, he lacked the time to get involved with both projects from the outset. Drymon has said, "I remember Hillenburg's bringing it up to Mark in our office and asking him if he'd be interested in working on it ... I was all ready to say yes to the offer, but Steve didn't ask; he just left the room. I was pretty desperate ... so I ran into the hall after him and basically begged him for the job. He didn't jump at the chance." Once Hillenburg had given it some thought and decided to bring Drymon on as creative director, the two began meeting at Hillenburg's house several times a week to develop the series. Drymon has identified this period as having begun in 1996, shortly after the end of Rocko's Modern Life.

Jennings was also instrumental in SpongeBob's genesis. Kenny has called him "one of SpongeBob's early graphics mentors". On weekends, Kenny joined Hillenburg, Jennings, and Drymon for creative sessions where they recorded ideas on a tape recorder. Kenny performed audio tests as SpongeBob during these sessions, while Hillenburg voice acted the other characters.

Hill contributed scripts for several first-season episodes (including the pilot) and was offered the role of story editor, but turned it down—he would go on to pursue a career as a family film director. In his stead, Pete Burns was brought in for the job. Burns hailed from Chicago and had never met any of the principal players on SpongeBob before joining the team.

=== Pitching ===
When pitching the idea for the series to Nickelodeon executives, Drymon said the SpongeBob crew "went all out" because they thought the pilot would only be accepted if the executives laughed. Hillenburg wore a Hawaiian shirt, brought along a terrarium containing models of the characters, and played Hawaiian music to set the tone. Executive Eric Coleman described the pitch as "pretty amazing"; his colleagues Kevin Kay and Albie Hecht had to step outside because they were exhausted from laughing. Drymon expected the executives to take weeks to make a decision, but they offered to make the series immediately. The crew was given money and two weeks to write the pilot episode "Help Wanted".

Before commissioning the full series, Nickelodeon executives insisted that it would not be popular unless SpongeBob was a child who went to school, citing one of their shows, Hey Arnold!, as an example. Hillenburg was ready to abandon the series, since he wanted SpongeBob to be an adult, but he compromised by adding a new character, Mrs. Puff, a boat-driving teacher whose school SpongeBob would attend. Hillenburg was satisfied with the compromise and happy that it brought in a new character.

== Television series ==
Series	Season	Episodes	Originally released			Showrunner(s)
Series	Season	Episodes	First released	Last released	Network	Showrunner(s)
SpongeBob SquarePants	1	20	May 1, 1999	March 3, 2001	Nickelodeon	Stephen Hillenburg
SpongeBob SquarePants	2	20	October 26, 2000	July 26, 2003	Nickelodeon	Stephen Hillenburg
SpongeBob SquarePants	3	20	October 5, 2001	October 11, 2004	Nickelodeon	Stephen Hillenburg
SpongeBob SquarePants	4	20	May 6, 2005	July 24, 2007	Nickelodeon	Paul Tibbitt
SpongeBob SquarePants	5	20	February 19, 2007	July 19, 2009	Nickelodeon	Paul Tibbitt
SpongeBob SquarePants	6	26	March 3, 2008	July 5, 2010	Nickelodeon	Paul Tibbitt
SpongeBob SquarePants	7	26	July 19, 2009	June 11, 2011	Nickelodeon	Paul Tibbitt
SpongeBob SquarePants	8	26	March 26, 2011	December 6, 2012	Nickelodeon	Paul Tibbitt
SpongeBob SquarePants	9	26	July 21, 2012	February 20, 2017	Nickelodeon	Paul Tibbitt, Vincent Waller, and Marc Ceccarelli
SpongeBob SquarePants	10	11	October 15, 2016	December 2, 2017	Nickelodeon	Vincent Waller and Marc Ceccarelli
SpongeBob SquarePants	11	26	June 24, 2017	November 25, 2018	Nickelodeon	Vincent Waller and Marc Ceccarelli
SpongeBob SquarePants	12	26	November 11, 2018	April 29, 2022	Nickelodeon	Vincent Waller and Marc Ceccarelli
SpongeBob SquarePants	13	26	October 22, 2020	November 1, 2023	Nickelodeon	Vincent Waller and Marc Ceccarelli
SpongeBob SquarePants	14	13	November 2, 2023	December 2, 2024	Nickelodeon	Vincent Waller and Marc Ceccarelli
SpongeBob SquarePants	15	13	July 24, 2024	June 20, 2025	Nickelodeon	Vincent Waller and Marc Ceccarelli
SpongeBob SquarePants	16	13	June 27, 2025	June 5, 2026	Nickelodeon	Vincent Waller and Marc Ceccarelli
SpongeBob SquarePants	17	13	June 12, 2026	TBA	Nickelodeon	Vincent Waller and Marc Ceccarelli
Kamp Koral: SpongeBob's Under Years	1	26	March 4, 2021	May 26, 2023	Paramount+	Luke Brookshier, Marc Ceccarelli, Andrew Goodman, Kaz, Mr. Lawrence, and Vincent Waller
Kamp Koral: SpongeBob's Under Years	2	13	July 10, 2024		Paramount+	Luke Brookshier, Marc Ceccarelli, Andrew Goodman, Kaz, Mr. Lawrence, and Vincent Waller
The Patrick Star Show	1	26	July 9, 2021	July 25, 2023	Nickelodeon	Luke Brookshier, Marc Ceccarelli, Andrew Goodman, Kaz, Mr. Lawrence, and Vincent Waller
The Patrick Star Show	2	13	July 26, 2023	July 25, 2024	Nickelodeon	Luke Brookshier, Marc Ceccarelli, Andrew Goodman, Kaz, Mr. Lawrence, and Vincent Waller
The Patrick Star Show	3	13	July 29, 2024	December 24, 2024	Nickelodeon	Luke Brookshier, Marc Ceccarelli, Andrew Goodman, Kaz, Mr. Lawrence, and Vincent Waller
The Patrick Star Show	4	13	March 21, 2025	July 10, 2026	Nickelodeon	Luke Brookshier, Marc Ceccarelli, Andrew Goodman, Kaz, Mr. Lawrence, and Vincent Waller
The Patrick Star Show	5	13	July 17, 2026	October 23, 2026	Nickelodeon	Luke Brookshier, Marc Ceccarelli, Andrew Goodman, Kaz, Mr. Lawrence, and Vincent Waller
The Patrick Star Show	6	13	October 12, 2026	TBA	Nickelodeon	Luke Brookshier, Marc Ceccarelli, Andrew Goodman, Kaz, Mr. Lawrence, and Vincent Waller

=== SpongeBob SquarePants (1999–present) ===
The series is set in the fictional underwater city, Bikini Bottom, and centers on the adventures and endeavors of SpongeBob SquarePants, an sea sponge.

=== Kamp Koral: SpongeBob's Under Years (2021–2024) ===
On February 14, 2019, it was announced that a SpongeBob SquarePants spin-off is in development. On June 4, it was announced the spinoff will be titled Kamp Koral. The plot will focus on a 10-year-old SpongeBob and his friends at the titular camp located in the Kelp Forest, where they spend the summer catching jellyfish, building campfires, and swimming in Lake Yuckymuck. It serves as a tie-in to the animated film The SpongeBob Movie: Sponge on the Run. It was confirmed production of the series began in June 2019.

Nickelodeon animation head Ramsey Naito said of the series, "SpongeBob has an incredible universe to expand upon and the greenlight for Kamp Koral is a testament to the strength and longevity of these characters known and loved by generations of fans around the world." Like SpongeBob SquarePants, the series is co-executive produced by Marc Ceccarelli, Jennie Monica, and Vincent Waller. Kamp Koral is produced using computer animation rather than the digital ink and paint animation used for SpongeBob SquarePants.

On February 19, 2020, it was announced that the series had an official title of "Kamp Koral: SpongeBob's Under Years", and would be premiering in July 2020. On July 30, 2020, it was announced that the series would be released on CBS All Access (now Paramount+), the ViacomCBS streaming service, in early 2021. On January 28, 2021, it was announced that the series would premiere on March 4, 2021.

=== The Patrick Star Show (2021–present) ===
On August 10, 2020, it was reported that a Patrick Star talk show titled The Patrick Star Show was in development with a 13-episode order. The show is similar to other talk shows such as The Larry Sanders Show and Comedy Bang! Bang!. The series premiered on Nickelodeon on July 9, 2021, with the series set to be available on Paramount+ later on.

== Films ==
Title	U.S. release date	Director(s)	Screenwriter(s)	Story by	Producer(s)	Animation services
Main series
The SpongeBob SquarePants Movie	November 19, 2004	Stephen Hillenburg	Derek Drymon, Tim Hill, Stephen Hillenburg, Kent Osborne, Aaron Springer & Paul Tibbitt	Stephen Hillenburg	Stephen Hillenburg and Julia Pistor	Rough Draft Studios, Korea; Tony Gardner, Inc. Warner Bros. Animation
The SpongeBob Movie: Sponge Out of Water	February 6, 2015	Paul Tibbitt	Jonathan Aibel & Glenn Berger	Stephen Hillenburg & Paul Tibbitt	Paul Tibbitt and Mary Parent	Rough Draft Studios, Korea (2D animation); Iloura VFX (3D animation)
The SpongeBob Movie: Sponge on the Run	March 4, 2021	Tim Hill		Tim Hill and Jonathan Aibel & Glenn Berger	Ryan Harris	Mikros Image
The SpongeBob Movie: Search for SquarePants	December 19, 2025	Derek Drymon	Pam Brady & Matt Lieberman	Marc Ceccarelli, Kaz & Pam Brady	Pam Brady, Lisa Stewart and Aaron Dem	Reel FX Animation; Fuse FX; Cinesite
Netflix spin-off films
Saving Bikini Bottom: The Sandy Cheeks Movie	August 2, 2024	Liza Johnson	Kaz & Tom Stern	Kaz	Robert Engleman	Nickelodeon Animation Studio; Sinking Ship Entertainment; Pipeline Studios; Spin VFX; ReDefine Animation
Plankton: The Movie	March 7, 2025	Dave Needham	Kaz, Chris Viscardi, & Mr. Lawrence	Mr. Lawrence	Marc Ceccarelli and Vincent Waller	Nickelodeon Animation Studio; Mikros Animation; ReDefine; Animation Yukfoo Animation; McBess Studios

=== The SpongeBob SquarePants Movie (2004) ===
In this live-action animated comedy, Plankton's plan is to steal King Neptune's crown and send it to the dangerous Shell City, and then frame Mr. Krabs for the crime. SpongeBob and Patrick must journey to Shell City while facing several perils along the way to retrieve the crown to save Mr. Krabs from Neptune's wrath and Bikini Bottom from Plankton's tyranny.

=== The SpongeBob Movie: Sponge Out of Water (2015) ===
The plot follows a pirate, Burger Beard (Antonio Banderas), who steals the Krabby Patty secret formula using a magical book that makes any text written upon it come true. After Bikini Bottom turns into an apocalyptic cesspool and the citizens turn against SpongeBob, he must team up with Plankton to find the formula and save Bikini Bottom. Later, SpongeBob, Patrick, Squidward, Mr. Krabs, Sandy, and Plankton must travel to the surface to confront Burger Beard and get the formula back before Bikini Bottom is completely destroyed.

=== The SpongeBob Movie: Sponge on the Run (2020) ===
The film centers on SpongeBob and Patrick traveling to the underwater Atlantic City to save Gary from King Poseidon. During the adventure, SpongeBob's friends reflect on them first meeting him at Camp Coral. The film showcases stylized 3D animation, with most of the movie presented in full CGI and some parts featuring 3D characters interacting with live-action environments, all animated by Mikros Animation.

=== The SpongeBob Movie: Search for SquarePants (2025) ===
In August 2021, Nickelodeon CEO Brian Robbins, mentioned that "there's a new SpongeBob film in the works". A fourth film was officially confirmed in February 2022, with a targeted theatrical release of the film. On November 10, 2022, it was announced that the film will release in theaters on May 23, 2025. The film's title was revealed on April 27, 2023. In October 2023, this film's release date was pushed back to December 19, 2025.

=== Spin-off films ===
In early March 2020, ViacomCBS announced that it would be producing two spin-off films based on the series for Paramount+. In February 2022, it was revealed that these plans had been revised to three character spinoff films.

==== Saving Bikini Bottom: The Sandy Cheeks Movie (2024) ====
In May 2021, a spin-off Sandy Cheeks feature film was announced to be in development from Nickelodeon for streaming television, to be directed by Liza Johnson from a script written by Kaz and Tom J. Stern and described as a hybrid feature that will put the animated title character into a live-action setting. On August 12, 2021, the title of the movie was revealed as Saving Bikini Bottom.

On August 16, 2021, it was revealed that plans to film Saving Bikini Bottom in Los Alamos were scrapped due to rewrites of the script. In February 2022, During its Investors call, Nickelodeon CEO Brian Robbins said that they would be working on the three character driven spin-off films would release them exclusively on its streamer Paramount+, with the first one premiering in 2023. In February 2023, Netflix also picked up distribution rights for the film with a planned 2023 release. In April 2023, it was revealed that the film would instead be released in 2024.

=== Fans′ Short films ===
==== SpongeBob SquareShorts ====
Nickelodeon launched the first global SpongeBob SquarePants-themed short film competition, SpongeBob SquareShorts: Original Fan Tributes, in 2013. The contest encouraged fans and filmmakers around the world to create original short films inspired by SpongeBob for a chance to win a prize and a trip for four people to a screening event in Hollywood. The contest opened on May 6 and ran through June 28, 2013. On July 19, 2013, Nickelodeon announced the competition's finalists. On August 13, 2013, the under 18 years of age category was won by David of the United States for his The Krabby Commercial, while the Finally Home short by Nicole of South Africa won the 18 and over category.

== Video games ==
Numerous video games based on the series have been produced. Some of the early games include: Legend of the Lost Spatula (2001) and SpongeBob SquarePants: Battle for Bikini Bottom (2003). In 2013, Nickelodeon published and distributed SpongeBob Moves In!, a freemium city-building game app developed by Kung Fu Factory for iOS and Android. SpongeBob SquarePants: Battle for Bikini Bottom – Rehydrated, a full remake of the console versions of the original 2003 game, was released in June 2020 and includes cut content from the original game. A platform game developed by Old Skull Games named Spongebob Squarepants: Patty Pursuit was released by Nickelodeon on Apple devices through Apple Arcade in May 2020. In 2021, EA Sports introduced a SpongeBob-themed level to the Yard section of its Madden NFL 21 video game. SpongeBob SquarePants: The Cosmic Shake, another original game based on the franchise, was released between January and December 2023.

== Comic books ==
The 32-page bimonthly comic book series, SpongeBob Comics, was announced in November 2010 and debuted the following February. Before this, SpongeBob SquarePants comics had been published in Nickelodeon Magazine, and episodes of the television series had been adapted by Cine-Manga, but SpongeBob Comics was the first American comic book series devoted solely to SpongeBob SquarePants. It also served as SpongeBob SquarePants creator Stephen Hillenburg's debut as a comic book author. The series was published by Hillenburg's production company, United Plankton Pictures, and distributed by Bongo Comics Group. Hillenburg described the stories from the comic books as "original and always true to the humor, characters, and universe of the SpongeBob SquarePants series." Leading up to the release of the series, Hillenburg said, "I'm hoping that fans will enjoy finally having a SpongeBob comic book from me."

Chris Duffy, the former senior editor of Nickelodeon Magazine, serves as managing editor of SpongeBob Comics. Hillenburg and Duffy met with various cartoonists—including James Kochalka, Hilary Barta, Graham Annable, Gregg Schigiel, and Jacob Chabot—to contribute to each issues. Retired horror comics writer and artist Stephen R. Bissette returned to write a special Halloween issue in 2012, with Tony Millionaire and Al Jaffee. In an interview with Tom Spurgeon, Bissette said, "I've even broken my retirement to do one work-for-hire gig for SpongeBob Comics so I could share everything about that kind of current job."

In the United Kingdom, Titan Magazines published comics based on SpongeBob SquarePants every four weeks from February 3, 2005, through November 28, 2013. Titan Magazines also teamed up with Lego to release a limited edition SpongeBob-themed comic.

== Music ==
Title	Released
SpongeBob SquarePants: Original Theme Highlights	August 14, 2001
The SpongeBob SquarePants Movie – Music from the Movie and More...	November 9, 2004
The Yellow Album	November 15, 2005
The Best Day Ever	September 12, 2006
The Sponge Who Could Fly	May 11, 2007
SpongeBob's Greatest Hits	July 14, 2009
It's a SpongeBob Christmas! Album	November 6, 2012
Music from "The SpongeBob Movie: Sponge Out of Water" EP	January 27, 2015
The SpongeBob Movie: Sponge Out of Water (Original Motion Picture Score)	March 23, 2015
SpongeBob SquarePants: The New Musical (Original Cast Recording)	September 22, 2017
The SpongeBob Movie: Sponge on the Run (Music from the Motion Picture)	April 16, 2021
Saving Bikini Bottom: The Sandy Cheeks Movie (Original Motion Picture Soundtrack)	August 2, 2024
Plankton: The Movie (Original Motion Picture Soundtrack)	March 6, 2025
Nautical Nonsense: 25th Anniversary Tribute Album	April 18, 2025
The SpongeBob Movie: Search for SquarePants (Music from the Motion Picture)	December 19, 2025

Collections of original music featured in the series have been released on the albums SpongeBob SquarePants: Original Theme Highlights (2001), SpongeBob's Greatest Hits (2009), and The Yellow Album (2005). The first two charted on the US Billboard 200, reaching number 171 and 122, respectively.

Several songs have been recorded for the purpose of a single or album release, and have not been featured on the show. The song "My Tidy Whities" written by Tom Kenny and Andy Paley was released only on the album The Best Day Ever (2006). Kenny's inspiration for the song was "underwear humor," saying: "Underwear humor is always a surefire laugh-getter with kids ... Just seeing a character that odd wearing really prosaic, normal, Kmart, three-to-a-pack underwear is a funny drawing ... We thought it was funny to make a really lush, beautiful love song to his underwear."

A soundtrack album The SpongeBob SquarePants Movie – Music from the Movie and More..., featuring the film's score was released along with the feature-length film in November 2004. Various artists including the Flaming Lips, Wilco, Ween, Motörhead, the Shins, and Avril Lavigne contributed to the soundtrack that reached number 76 on the US Billboard 200.

== Theater ==
SpongeBob SquarePants was adapted as a stage musical in 2016 by director Tina Landau. SpongeBob SquarePants, The Broadway Musical premiered in Chicago in 2016 and opened on Broadway at the Palace Theatre on December 4, 2017. The musical opened to critical acclaim, and tied for most-nominated production at the 2018 72nd Tony Awards with twelve Tony nominations.

== Theme park rides ==
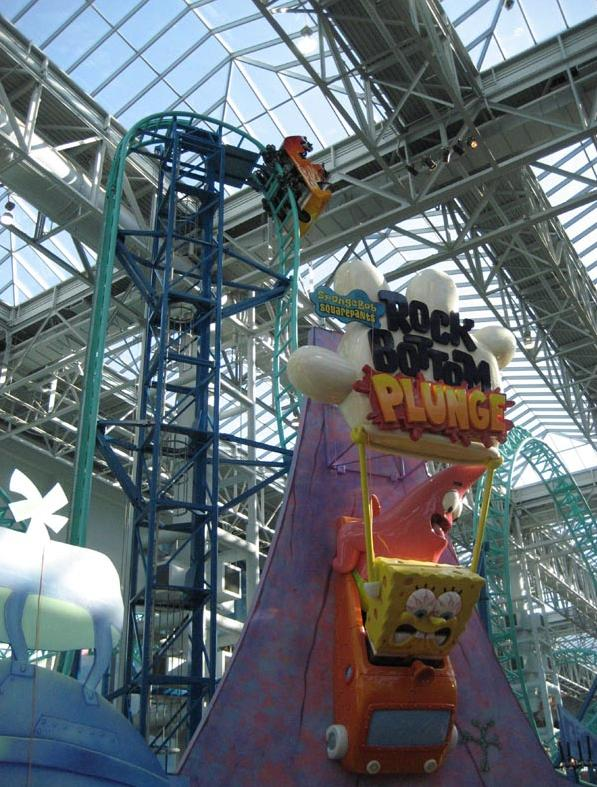
Entrance and lift hill of SpongeBob SquarePants Rock Bottom Plunge ride at the Mall of America

The SpongeBob SquarePants 4-D film and ride opened at several locations including Six Flags Over Texas, Flamingo Land Resort, and the Shedd Aquarium. The ride features water squirts, real bubbles, and other sensory enhancements. In 2012, Nickelodeon teamed up again with SimEx-Iwerks Entertainment and Super 78 to produce SpongeBob SquarePants 4-D: The Great Jelly Rescue. The attraction opened in early 2013 at the Mystic Aquarium & Institute for Exploration. It was also installed at the Nickelodeon Suites Resort Orlando in Orlando, Florida. The seven-minute film follows SpongeBob, Patrick, and Sandy rescuing the jellyfish of Jellyfish Fields from Plankton's evil clutches. On May 23, 2015, an interactive 3D show titled SpongeBob SubPants Adventure opened in Texas at Moody Gardens. The show was replaced with a generic "20,000 Leagues Under the Sea" re-theming in 2019. A dark ride shooter attraction titled SpongeBob's Crazy Carnival Ride opened at the Circus Circus Resort in Las Vegas, Nevada in 2024.

A variety of SpongeBob SquarePants-related attractions are currently located within Nickelodeon themed-areas at Movie Park Germany, Pleasure Beach Blackpool, Sea World, American Dream Meadowlands, and Mall of America, which includes the SpongeBob SquarePants Rock Bottom Plunge euro-fighter roller coaster.

In 2024, Majaland Gdańsk opened in Gdańsk and as part of the extended cooperation with Nickelodeon, offers Nickelodeon Land, in which offers rides inspired by SpongeBob. From April 2025, mascots of SpongeBob and Patrick appears in the remaining Majaland parks in Poland.

In 2026, Universal Kids Resort opened a themed land based on the franchise.

== Merchandise ==
The popularity of SpongeBob SquarePants inspired merchandise from T-shirts to posters. It was reported that the franchise generated an estimated $8 billion in merchandising revenue for Nickelodeon. It is also the most distributed property of ViacomCBS Domestic Media Networks. SpongeBob is viewed in 170 countries speaking 24 languages, and has become "a killer merchandising app". The title character and his friends have been used as a theme for special editions of well-known family board games, including Monopoly, Life, and Operation, as well as a SpongeBob SquarePants edition of Ants in the Pants, and Yahtzee. In April 2019, Nickelodeon released Masterpiece Memes, a series of toys adapted from various SpongeBob Internet memes.
