= SpongeBob SquarePants (disambiguation) =

SpongeBob SquarePants is an animated television series.

SpongeBob SquarePants may also refer to:

- SpongeBob SquarePants (character), the main character in the television series
- SpongeBob SquarePants (film series), a series of film adaptations
- SpongeBob SquarePants (franchise), the multimedia franchise
- SpongeBob SquarePants (musical), a musical adaptation
- Seasons of the television series:
  - SpongeBob SquarePants season 1
  - SpongeBob SquarePants season 2
  - SpongeBob SquarePants season 3
  - SpongeBob SquarePants season 4
  - SpongeBob SquarePants season 5
  - SpongeBob SquarePants season 6
  - SpongeBob SquarePants season 7
  - SpongeBob SquarePants season 8
  - SpongeBob SquarePants season 9
  - SpongeBob SquarePants season 10
  - SpongeBob SquarePants season 11
  - SpongeBob SquarePants season 12
  - SpongeBob SquarePants season 13
  - SpongeBob SquarePants season 14
  - SpongeBob SquarePants season 15
  - SpongeBob SquarePants season 16
  - SpongeBob SquarePants season 17
- SpongeBob SquarePants video games, the collection of video games in the franchise
