= Producers Guild of America Award for Outstanding Children's Program =

- Awarded for: Outstanding Children's Program
- Country: United States
- Presented by: Producers Guild of America
- First award: 2011
- Currently held by: Sesame Street (2025)

The Producers Guild of America Award for Outstanding Children's Program is an annual award given by the Producers Guild of America since 2011.

== Winners and nominees ==
=== 2010s ===
Year	Winners and nominees	Network	Ref.
2011 (23rd)	Sesame Street	PBS	
2011 (23rd)	Dora the Explorer	Nickelodeon	
2011 (23rd)	iCarly	Nickelodeon	
2011 (23rd)	Phineas and Ferb (seasons 2 & 3)	Disney Channel	
2011 (23rd)	SpongeBob SquarePants (seasons 7 & 8)	Nickelodeon	
2012 (24th)	Sesame Street	PBS	
2012 (24th)	Good Luck Charlie	Disney Channel	
2012 (24th)	iCarly	Nickelodeon	
2012 (24th)	Phineas and Ferb (seasons 3 & 4)	Disney Channel	
2012 (24th)	The Weight of the Nation for Kids: The Great Cafeteria Takeover	HBO	
2013 (25th)	Sesame Street	PBS	
2013 (25th)	Dora the Explorer	Nickelodeon	
2013 (25th)	iCarly	Nickelodeon	
2013 (25th)	Phineas and Ferb (season 4)	Disney Channel	
2013 (25th)	SpongeBob SquarePants (season 9)	Nickelodeon	
2014 (26th)	Sesame Street	PBS	
2014 (26th)	Dora the Explorer	Nickelodeon	
2014 (26th)	Teenage Mutant Ninja Turtles	Nickelodeon	
2014 (26th)	Toy Story of Terror!	ABC	
2014 (26th)	Wynton Marsalis: A YoungArts Masterclass	HBO	
2015 (27th)	Sesame Street	PBS	
2015 (27th)	Doc McStuffins	Disney Junior	
2015 (27th)	The Fairly OddParents	Nickelodeon	
2015 (27th)	Octonauts	Disney Junior	
2015 (27th)	Teenage Mutant Ninja Turtles	Nickelodeon	
2015 (27th)	Toy Story That Time Forgot	ABC	
2016 (28th)	Sesame Street (season 46)	PBS	
2016 (28th)	Girl Meets World (seasons 2 & 3)	Disney Channel	
2016 (28th)	Octonauts (season 4)	Disney Junior	
2016 (28th)	School of Rock (season 1)	Nickelodeon	
2016 (28th)	SpongeBob SquarePants (season 9)	Nickelodeon	
2017 (29th)	Sesame Street (season 47)	PBS	
2017 (29th)	Doc McStuffins (season 4)	Disney Junior	
2017 (29th)	Nickelodeon Kids' Choice Awards 2017	Nickelodeon	
2017 (29th)	School of Rock (season 3)	Nickelodeon	
2017 (29th)	SpongeBob SquarePants (seasons 10 & 11)	Nickelodeon	
2018 (30th)	Sesame Street (season 48)	PBS	
2018 (30th)	Fuller House (season 4)	Netflix	
2018 (30th)	PJ Masks (season 2)	Disney Junior	
2018 (30th)	A Series of Unfortunate Events (season 2)	Netflix	
2018 (30th)	Teen Titans Go! (season 4)	Cartoon Network	
2019 (31st)	Sesame Street (season 49)	PBS	
2019 (31st)	Carmen Sandiego (seasons 1 & 2)	Netflix	
2019 (31st)	Green Eggs and Ham (season 1)	Netflix	
2019 (31st)	The Dark Crystal: Age of Resistance (season 1)	Netflix	
2019 (31st)	A Series of Unfortunate Events (season 3)	Netflix	

=== 2020s ===
Year	Winners and nominees	Network	Ref.
2020 (32nd)	The Power of We: A Sesame Street Special	HBO Max	
2020 (32nd)	Animaniacs (season 1)	Hulu	
2020 (32nd)	Carmen Sandiego (season 3)	Netflix	
2020 (32nd)	Looney Tunes Cartoons (season 1)	HBO Max	
2020 (32nd)	Star Wars: The Clone Wars (season 7)	Disney+	
2021 (33rd)	Muppets Haunted Mansion	Disney+	
2021 (33rd)	Animaniacs (season 2)	Hulu	
2021 (33rd)	Harry Potter: Hogwarts Tournament of Houses (season 1)	TBS	
2021 (33rd)	See Us Coming Together: A Sesame Street Special	HBO Max	
2021 (33rd)	Waffles + Mochi (season 1)	Netflix	
2022 (34th)	Sesame Street (season 52)	HBO Max	
2022 (34th)	Fraggle Rock: Back to the Rock (season 1)	Apple TV+	
2022 (34th)	Green Eggs and Ham (season 2)	Netflix	
2022 (34th)	Snoopy Presents: It's The Small Things, Charlie Brown	Apple TV+	
2022 (34th)	Waffles + Mochi's Restaurant (season 1)	Netflix	
2023 (35th)	Sesame Street (season 53)	Max	
2023 (35th)	Goosebumps (season 1)	Disney+/Hulu	
2023 (35th)	Gremlins: Secrets of the Mogwai (season 1)	Max	
2023 (35th)	Star Wars: The Bad Batch (season 2)	Disney+	
2023 (35th)	The Velveteen Rabbit	Apple TV+	
2024 (36th)	Sesame Street (season 54)	Max	
2024 (36th)	Avatar: The Last Airbender	Netflix	
2024 (36th)	Fraggle Rock: Back to the Rock	Apple TV+	
2024 (36th)	Percy Jackson and the Olympians	Disney+	
2024 (36th)	SpongeBob SquarePants (seasons 14 & 15)	Nickelodeon	
2025 (37th)	Sesame Street (seasons 55 & 56)	Max, Netflix	
2025 (37th)	LEGO Star Wars: Rebuild the Galaxy – Pieces of the Past	Disney+	
2025 (37th)	Phineas and Ferb (season 5)	Disney Channel, Disney+	
2025 (37th)	Snoopy Presents: A Summer Musical	Apple TV+	
2025 (37th)	SpongeBob SquarePants (seasons 15 & 16)	Nickelodeon	

== Programs with multiple awards ==
14 awards

- Sesame Street (11 consecutive)

== Programs with multiple nominations ==
15 nominations

- Sesame Street

6 nominations

- SpongeBob SquarePants

4 nominations

- Phineas and Ferb

3 nominations

- Dora the Explorer
- iCarly
- Teenage Mutant Ninja Turtles

2 nominations

- Animaniacs
- A Series of Unfortunate Events
- Carmen Sandiego
- Doc McStuffins
- Fraggle Rock: Back to the Rock
- Green Eggs and Ham
- Octonauts
- School of Rock
