= SBSP =

SBSP may refer to:

- Space-based solar power
- SpongeBob SquarePants, an animated Nickelodeon television series, franchise, or its titular character.
  - SpongeBob SquarePants (disambiguation)
- Suheldev Bharatiya Samaj Party, a regional political party in India
- Polish Independent Highland Brigade (Polish: Samodzielna Brygada Strzelców Podhalańskich), an official name for the Polish military unit created in France in 1939
- Congonhas-São Paulo International Airport, an airport with ICAO airport code SBSP
