= SpongeBob SquarePants season 17 =

Season of television series

SpongeBob SquarePants
- Season 17
- Showrunners: Marc Ceccarelli; Vincent Waller
- Starring: Tom Kenny; Bill Fagerbakke; Rodger Bumpass; Clancy Brown; Carolyn Lawrence; Mr. Lawrence; Jill Talley; Mary Jo Catlett; Lori Alan
- No. of episodes: 13 (26 segments)

Release
- Original network: Nickelodeon
- Original release: June 12 – November 20, 2026

Season chronology
- ← Previous; Season 16

The seventeenth season of the American animated television series SpongeBob SquarePants, created by former marine biologist and animator Stephen Hillenburg, premiered on Nickelodeon on June 12, 2026, and concluded on November 20, 2026. It consists of 13 episodes, comprising 26 segments. The series chronicles the exploits and adventures of the title character and his various friends in the fictional underwater city of Bikini Bottom.

== Production ==
The second half of the fourteenth season was split into a fifteenth season, with the first half of the fifteenth production season airing as the sixteenth season, therefore making the second half of said production season the seventeenth season.

== Episodes ==
No. overall	No. in season	Title	Directed by (Note: Information is taken from the opening credits of each episode.)	Written by	Original release date	U.S. viewers (millions)
333	1	"The Nerds"	Supervising direction by : Sherm Cohen; Animation directed by : Michelle Bryan	Storyboarded by : Zeus Cervas (director); Written by : Mike Bell	July 17, 2026	N/A
333	1	"The SquarePants Method"	Supervising direction by : Ian Vazquez; Animation directed by : Michelle Bryan	Storyboarded by : Dan Becker (director); Written by : Andrew Goodman	July 17, 2026	N/A
"The Nerds": Squidward creates a comic book, Super Imbeciles, after SpongeBob and Patrick beg him to create one, which gets him a lot of fame around Bikini Bottom. "The SquarePants Method": Mr. Krabs rents out the Krusty Krab to film a movie starring famous actor Marlin Branzino, playing a role as SpongeBob in the film.: Guest star: Maurice LaMarche as Marlin Branzino
334	2	"Kiss of the Nematode"	Supervising direction by : Dave Cunningham; Animation directed by : Eric Bryan	Storyboarded by : Fred Osmond (director); Written by : Danny Giovannini	June 12, 2026	N/A
334	2	"Brainless Brawn"	Supervising direction by : Sherm Cohen; Animation directed by : Michelle Bryan	Storyboarded by : Kurt Snyder (director); Written by : Kaz	June 12, 2026	N/A
"Kiss of the Nematode": SpongeBob kisses a nematode which turns it back into an actual person named Guy Fishman, who was cursed by a witch after taking the last spot at a movie theater. However, Guy enjoyed being a worm, and was about to propose to a female nematode, forcing him and SpongeBob to persuade the witch to turn him back before his wedding.: Guest stars: Kevin McDonald as Guy Fishman, Amy Sedaris as Blobba Yaga; "Brainless Brawn": After discovering that Patrick's stupidity boosts his strength, Larry decides to study his actions in order to gain enough strength to win a weightlifting tournament, which Patrick is also attending.
335	3	"Home Away From Home"	Supervising direction by : Ian Vazquez; Animation directed by : Michelle Bryan	Storyboarded by : Zeus Cervas (director); Written by : Mr. Lawrence	June 19, 2026	0.11
335	3	"SpongeBob SpareParts"	Supervising direction by : Dave Cunningham; Animation directed by : Eric Bryan	Storyboarded by : Dan Becker (director); Written by : Luke Brookshier	June 19, 2026	0.11
"Home Away from Home": When Patrick's rock gets collected by construction workers, SpongeBob and Squidward's houses come to life and travel across the city in order to rescue it before their owners get back.: Guest stars: Kevin Michael Richardson as Squidward's house Tiki, Wallace Shawn as SpongeBob's house Piney; "SpongeBob SpareParts": After SpongeBob breaks his arms and legs while cooking, Sandy equips robotic limbs on him. However, SpongeBob soon learns that technological advancements aren't what they're cracked up to be when he becomes fully cyborg, and a malfunction leads him to destroy the Krusty Krab.
336	4	"The Lady in the Lighthouse"	Supervising direction by : Sherm Cohen; Animation directed by : Michelle Bryan	Storyboarded by : Fred Osmond (director); Written by : Andrew Goodman	June 26, 2026	N/A
336	4	"Bitter Groans and Gardens"	Supervising direction by : Ian Vazquez	Storyboarded by : Brian Morante (director); Written by : Mike Bell	June 26, 2026	N/A
"The Lady in the Lighthouse": After Mrs. Puff discovers that her boating school has been vandalized, Squidward and SpongeBob play as detectives to solve the crime. "Bitter Groans and Gardens": After taking notice of SpongeBob's beautiful flower garden, Squidward tries to grow a better garden in order to win a gardening competition.
337	5	"The Fry Cook and the Elves"	Supervising direction by : Dave Cunningham; Animation directed by : Eric Bryan	Storyboarded by : Zeus Cervas (director); Written by : Kaz	July 24, 2026	N/A
337	5	"It's About Mime"	Supervising direction by : Sherm Cohen; Animation directed by : Michelle Bryan	Storyboarded by : Dan Becker (director); Written by : Danny Giovannini	July 24, 2026	N/A
"The Fry Cook and the Elves": SpongeBob saves a group of urchins from starving out on the streets by feeding them a Krabby Patty. The urchins turn out to be elves, who pay up the favor by cooking tons of patties when SpongeBob is overwhelmed by a gigantic order from King Neptune. However, the elves take it too far and take control of SpongeBob's job. "It's About Mime": After lending a mime a dime for his entertaining acts, SpongeBob is stuck with the performer everywhere he goes and seeks the help of Plankton to get rid of him.: Guest star: Steven Banks as the mime
338	6	"Plankton's Squeeze Play"	Supervising direction by : Ian Vazquez	Storyboarded by : Fred Osmond (director); Written by : Luke Brookshier	July 10, 2026	N/A
338	6	"How the West Was Dumb"	Supervising direction by : Dave Cunningham; Animation directed by : Eric Bryan	Storyboarded by : Kurt Snyder (director); Written by : Andrew Goodman	July 10, 2026	N/A
"Plankton's Squeeze Play": After seeing Squidward's ability to compress himself to escape tight areas, Plankton hijacks the cephalopod's body in order to take advantage of it and steal the Krabby Patty secret formula. "How the West Was Dumb": SpongeBob and Sandy venture out west in search of bubble soap, and Krabs follows them, seeking to obtain untold riches.
339	7	"My Tighty Whiteys"	Supervising direction by : Sherm Cohen; Animation directed by : Eric Bryan	Storyboarded by : Zeus Cervas (director); Written by : Mr. Lawrence	July 31, 2026	N/A
339	7	"What Ever Happened to Baby Prunes?"	Supervising direction by : Ian Vazquez	Storyboarded by : Dan Becker (director); Written by : Kaylee Huffman	July 31, 2026	N/A
"My Tighty Whiteys": SpongeBob's underwear goes missing, and he struggles to find them or move on from his childhood pair, even singing a song about his connection to them. When they do return to him, they disintegrate, being too frail to continue on. Patrick comforts SpongeBob, telling him that his underwear belongs to the universe now.: Note: The ending of the episode pays a tribute to Andy Paley, who helped write the song.; "What Ever Happened to Baby Prunes?": SpongeBob and Patrick listen to the story of Baby Prunes' dislike for chocolate, taking the worm back to the 1900s, where she was a poster girl for a popular prune candy brand.
340	8	"Night School Knuckleheads"	Supervising direction by : Dave Cunningham; Animation directed by : Eric Bryan	Storyboarded by : Fred Osmond (director); Written by : Kaz	August 7, 2026	N/A
340	8	"Painfully Employed"	Supervising direction by : Sherm Cohen; Animation directed by : Michelle Bryan	Storyboarded by : Kurt Snyder (director); Written by : Danny Giovannini	August 7, 2026	N/A
"Night School Knuckleheads": SpongeBob and Patrick's skydiving course lands them into a night school, where familiar Bikini Bottomites such as Squidward, Bubble Bass and Kevin teach classes for adults. "Painfully Employed": Mama Bass is sick of her son's overbearing Krusty Krab orders, forcing him to get a job if he ever wants to earn the money to savor another meal. Bubble Bass takes up an occupation at the Chum Bucket while Karen is away, and Plankton uses his innards as a cover-up to steal the secret formula.
341	9	"Duct Tape Dystopia"	Supervising direction by : Ian Vazquez	Storyboarded by : Zeus Cervas (director); Written by : Luke Brookshier	August 21, 2026	N/A
341	9	"Farmer's Market Feud"	Supervising direction by : Dave Cunningham; Animation directed by : Eric Bryan	Storyboarded by : Dan Becker (director); Written by : Andrew Goodman	August 21, 2026	N/A
"Duct Tape Dystopia": The Krusty Krew give the Krusty Krab much-needed renovating. "Farmer's Market Feud": At the farmers' market, the planktons and the narwhals are in lock horns until their seanut butter and jelly condiments mesh with the Krabby Buns for sampling at SpongeBob's stand. They all combine to make a delicious PB&J sandwich, and the two quarreling parties must work with SpongeBob to turn out a successful product.
342	10	"Rock Bottom Games"	Supervising direction by : Ian Vazquez	Storyboarded by : Kurt Snyder (director); Written by : Mr. Lawrence	August 28, 2026	N/A
342	10	"Clicking with a Clique"	Supervising direction by : Sherm Cohen; Animation directed by : Michelle Bryan	Storyboarded by : Fred Osmond (director); Written by : Kaz	August 28, 2026	N/A
"Rock Bottom Games": At the bottom of the sea, creatures big and small compete for a medal in athletic Rock Bottom competitions, where wacky shenanigans ensue. Plankton tries to cheat out an award for himself, but each attempt ends up in disaster. "Clicking with a Clique": SpongeBob and Patrick decide that they need to join a clique, and the two compete for a spot in Bubble Bass' when one of its the members is fished away.
343	11	"Backyard Bickering"	Supervising direction by : Dave Cunningham; Animation directed by : Eric Bryan	Storyboarded by : Zeus Cervas (director); Written by : Danny Giovannini	November 6, 2026 (Note: This episode aired early on Nicktoons on October 30, 2026.)	TBD
343	11	"A Hair Grows on Patrick"	Supervising direction by : Sherm Cohen; Animation directed by : Michelle Bryan	Storyboarded by : Dan Becker (director); Written by : Kaz	November 6, 2026	TBD
"Backyard Bickering": After seeing a line of customers at the Krusty Krab complaining about their orders, Sandy's brother, Randy Cheeks, sets up a backyard wrestling ring outside the Krusty Krab. "A Hair Grows on Patrick": A hair grows on Patrick's forehead, and Patrick tries several different ways to get it off of him, resulting in comical failures.
344	12	"Yoga Yahoos"	Supervising direction by : Ian Vazquez	Storyboarded by : Fred Osmond (director); Written by : Luke Brookshier	November 13, 2026	TBD
344	12	"Sounds Like Trouble"	Supervising direction by : Dave Cunningham; Animation directed by : Eric Bryan	Storyboarded by : Piero Piluso (director); Written by : Andrew Goodman	November 13, 2026	TBD
"Yoga Yahoos": Squidward attends his yoga class, and takes over for his instructor while she is dealing with a "yoga emergency." It's all uphill for the octopus until SpongeBob and Patrick crash the session. Squidward tries to get rid of the two, but it ultimately leads to his demise. "Sounds Like Trouble": Patrick and mobster Don Scarfish switch voice boxes after an accident at Glove World. Patrick's new voice makes life more carefree for the starfish, even gaining the friendship of Scarfish's gang. This is all to Scarfish's chagrin, who chases Patrick down for his old voice back.: Guest star: Jonathan Banks as Don Scarfish
345	13	"Upturn's Bunch"	Supervising direction by : Sherm Cohen; Animation directed by : Michelle Bryan	Storyboarded by : Kurt Snyder (director); Written by : Danny Giovannini	November 20, 2026	TBD
345	13	"Free with Every Meal"	Supervising direction by : Ian Vazquez	Storyboarded by : Zeus Cervas (director); Written by : Mr. Lawrence	November 20, 2026	TBD
