= Killing off =

Device in fiction

The killing off of a character is a device in fiction, whereby a character dies, but the story continues. The term, frequently applied to television, film, video game, comic book, literature, anime, manga and chronological series, often denotes an untimely or unexpected death motivated by factors beyond the storyline, often done for emotional effect and to advance through the story.

In productions featuring actors, the unwillingness or inability of an actor to continue with the production for financial or other reasons (including illness, death, disagreements, unavailability, and producers' unwillingness or inability to retain an actor) may lead to that character being "killed off" or phased out from the storyline in another way, which ends their story arc. In some cases, they may or may not be mentioned at all.

== Examples ==
=== Literature ===
"The Final Problem", an 1893 story by Arthur Conan Doyle, ends with Sherlock Holmes plunging to his death at the Reichenbach Falls, in struggle with his arch enemy Professor Moriarty. There is ample evidence that Doyle fully intended this to be Holmes' definite and final end. Doyle wanted to write no more Sherlock Holmes stories, feeling that they were distracting him from more serious literary efforts and that "killing off" Holmes was the only way of getting his career back on track. "I must save my mind for better things," he wrote to his mother, "even if it means I must bury my pocketbook with him." Conan Doyle sought to sweeten the pill by letting Holmes go in a blaze of glory, having him rid the world of a criminal so powerful and dangerous that any further task would be trivial in comparison; indeed, Holmes says as much in the story. However, the Holmes fans refused to be mollified, continually protesting and pressuring Doyle until he brought their hero back to life.

Doyle did permanently kill off Mary Morstan, who happily married Doctor Watson at the end of The Sign of Four, but who apparently became inconvenient for later Sherlock Holmes stories. Her death – never described directly, but only mentioned in passing in The Adventure of the Norwood Builder – allowed Watson to resume living with Holmes on Baker Street and set off with him for a new adventure at a moment's notice. Fans did not protest her end, and Doyle never brought her back.

Alexandre Dumas wrote The Three Musketeers which proved highly successful, and added several sequels. However, the final one, The Vicomte of Bragelonne: Ten Years Later, ends with the death of all the Musketeers, one by one except Aramis – making clear to readers that he would write no more of them.

In 1956, Ian Fleming was becoming disenchanted with his James Bond books and wrote to his friend, the American author Raymond Chandler: "My muse is in a very bad way ... I am getting fed up with Bond and it has been very difficult to make him go through his tawdry tricks." In April 1956, Fleming re-wrote the final chapter of From Russia, with Love, to make the book end with Rosa Klebb poisoning Bond and him falling unconscious to the floor - which allowed Fleming, had he wanted to, to announce that that was Bond's end and that there would be no further Bond books. However, Fleming later changed his mind; in the beginning of Dr. No it is recounted that Bond recovered from the poisoning, and he went on to many more adventures.

Science fiction writer Harry Turtledove has produced many series of alternative history depicting alternate versions of various wars (the American Civil War, The First and Second World Wars, the Korean War etc.). Such Turtledove books typically include a large cast of alternating point of view characters, drawn from both sides of the conflict, whose lives continually interweave with each other in the book's plot. In such books, Turtledove is in the frequent habit of suddenly killing off one or more of his characters, often a sympathetic one to whom readers were attracted. In some of these cases, a soldier character is depicted as getting unscathed through very heavy fighting and then getting killed in a trivial skirmish or incident – which does happen in real war but rarely in fictional depictions.

=== Television ===
Because of the episodic format of television shows, audience feedback and approval is often a factor in whether or not a character is killed off. Damon Lindelof, executive producer of Lost, has been quoted as saying that despite the widespread hate for Nikki and Paulo, "We had a plan when we introduced them, and we didn't get to fully execute that plan. But when the plan is executed, [they] will be iconic characters on the show." In an example of a character being killed off as a result of an actor leaving the show, Raymond Cruz's character Tuco Salamanca on Breaking Bad was killed off because he found the part too difficult to play. Characters may be killed off when the actors die, while in some cases the death of an actor results in a new actor being selected to take over the role. John Ritter's character in 8 Simple Rules was written to have died off screen after Ritter himself died during taping of the show.

Mr. Hooper of the PBS Kids show, Sesame Street, is another example of a character "killed off." When actor Will Lee died on December 7, 1982, the staff of Children's Television Workshop were thinking of recasting Mr. Hooper, or quietly having the character retire from the show. Instead, they made a special tribute episode where humans explained to Big Bird that Mr. Hooper had died and told Big Bird about the irreversibility of death. The episode aired on November 24, 1983.

The Palestinian children's character Farfur (a Mickey Mouse lookalike) is an example of a character "killed off" for political reasons in 2007. After the program received criticism from some government ministers in both Palestine and Israel, as well as from the Disney family, for espousing anti-Israeli and antisemitic sentiments, the Farfur character was killed off. Even his death, at the hands of an "Israeli agent", making Farfur a "martyr", was similarly politicised.

The Simpsons, a show which often does not abide by continuity, has killed off several characters for different reasons: most notably, Maude Flanders was killed on-screen, due to a contract dispute with her voice actor, Maggie Roswell. Edna Krabappel died off-screen after the death of her late voice artist Marcia Wallace on October 25, 2013.

Priceline.com apparently killed off its lead character, the "Priceline Negotiator" (portrayed by longtime company spokesman William Shatner), in an advertisement during Super Bowl XLVI. The killing off, however, turned out to be a hoax, as Shatner returned with his protégé (portrayed by Kaley Cuoco) in later commercials. In a similar manner, Planters killed off its century-old mascot Mr. Peanut in an advertising campaign leading up to Super Bowl LIV, only to resurrect him as a baby during a commercial during that game. Following a fan controversy, the original Mr. Peanut was brought back by demand the next year.

When racing driver Perry McCarthy left the television show Top Gear, his character, The Stig, was 'killed off' in a stunt involving driving a Jaguar off an aircraft carrier; he was replaced with a similar but white-suited version of the same character.

After the death of Dan Blocker in 1972, Bonanza ended after its 14th season in 1973 without his character Hoss Cartwright. The result of having his character killed off did not occur until the TV film adaptation Bonanza: The Next Generation in 1988.

In the Dinosaurs' infamous finale "Changing Nature", all the dinosaur characters are killed off by the coming of Ice age, surprising the audience. Michael Jacobs stated that "We certainly wanted to make the episode to be educational to the audience", and as people knew dinosaurs were no longer alive, "The show would end by completing the metaphor and showing that extinction."

The Walt Disney Company is believed to have killed off the wife of Goofy from the Everyman short films on the pre-released script of Goof Troop as Goofy tells his son Max that she’s "up there with the stars" without direct details. For a long time, Disney has refused to explain about Mrs. Goof's personality due to the company’s tendencies against inter-specie marriage being portrayed, as well as dismissing the entire Everyman films' canon on the grounds that they were regarded as sexist. However, this statement wasn’t used in the show itself, regarding this as a speculation as Disney Guest Services FAQ confirmed there are no definitive answers regarding details of Mrs. Goof at this time due to the result that she was never revealed "on the screen".

Some characters after the deaths of their actors are not killed off, but are forced to be phased out, like Mermaid Man and Barnacle Boy from SpongeBob SquarePants who could not be recast in subsequent episodes after Ernest Borgnine dying of kidney failure in 2012, and Tim Conway dying from complications of normal pressure hydrocephalus in 2019. Their characters are replaced by Captain Doug Quasar and Pat-Tron afterwards.

Trini Kwan, the first Yellow Ranger from the original series, is killed off in Mighty Morphin Power Rangers: Once & Always (2023) due to her actress Thuy Trang died in the car crash in 2001, at the age of 27. Trang is dedicated to her memory, alongside with Jason David Frank, his actor who played Tommy Oliver, died of suicide in 2022.

=== Film ===
Doc Hudson, from the 2006 Pixar film Cars, is killed off from the subsequent Cars series due to his actor, Paul Newman, dying of lung cancer in 2008. John Lasseter included a tribute to the character in Cars 3.

In the 1998 sequel Blues Brothers 2000, John Belushi's character, Jake Blues, is killed off before the event of this film, as Belushi had died of combined drug intoxication in 1982. Jim Belushi was originally set to replace his brother's character as Brother Zee Blues, but was cut due to being under the contract with ABC while casting for the TV series Total Security. Prior to the sequel, an animated series based on the 1980 film was in the works and was scheduled to air in 1997. Peter Aykroyd and Jim Belushi were set to replace the original actors. Unfortunately, it was canceled due to the irreplaceability of the original actors. John Landis, the director of the 1980 film and its sequel, stated that further reappearance of Jake Blues was denied.

Filmation killed off The Wicked Queen in the Snow White sequel Happily Ever After due to avoiding resemblance from the 1937 movie after facing legal issues with The Walt Disney Company from the previous film Pinocchio and the Emperor of the Night. The gusty image of the deceased Queen's face is briefly seen when the Magic Mirror (with a more comical design) show her evil brother, Lord Maliss (who would take the role as the main antagonist), her whereabouts then got freaked out by it.

Some characters after the deaths of their actors are not killed off, but are forced to be phased out, like Anne-Marie from All Dogs Go to Heaven who could not be recast in subsequent films after the murder of Judith Barsi in 1988. Her character is replaced by David afterwards, as well as pushing the timeline further in the present day.

Metro-Goldwyn-Mayer killed off Barf from the Spaceballs franchise after his actor and comedian John Candy dying of a heart attack in 1994, while filming Wagons East (1994). His character is replaced by Destiny (Keke Palmer) and Starburst (Lewis Pullman) in the 2027 sequel.

=== Comics ===
Death is a frequently used dramatic device in comic book fiction, and in particular superhero fiction. Unlike stories in television or film, character deaths are rarely by unforeseen behind-the-scenes events, as there is no analogous situation to having actors portraying characters. Instead, characters are typically killed off as part of the story or occasionally by editorial mandate to generate publicity for a title. Teasers may hint at characters' deaths for an extended period. A number of factors often mean that the changes are not permanent.

Extremely long print runs, the popularity of characters (with writers and fans) and occasionally rights issues for using the character in licensed adaptations often make characters be brought back to life by later writers. That can happen either as a depiction of their literal resurrection or by retcon, a revision that changes earlier continuity and establishes the character not to have died in the first place. This phenomenon is known as the comic book death. Killing off a main character such as Superman, Batman or Captain America can often lead to an uptick in publicity for a comic book and high sales for the story in which they are inevitably brought back to life.

Some writers have also criticized the trend for killing off supporting characters, particularly when female characters are killed off brutally to elicit a strong reaction in the male protagonist. This is known as the Women in Refrigerators trope. Specifically, the Death of Gwen Stacy, long-time girlfriend of Spider-Man, caused great shock and long-lasting controversy among fans, deeply shocking the American comic book community. Previously, it had been unthinkable to kill off such an important character—the girlfriend of a protagonist with a large fanbase. Generally, a superhero did not fail so disastrously unless it was part of their origin story. This story arc has been proposed as a marker of beginning of the end of the Silver Age of Comic Books, and the beginning of the darker, grittier Bronze Age. The subsequent tendency for the wives and girlfriends of male superheroes to meet grim fates was referred to as "The Gwen Stacy Syndrome" by the Comics Buyer's Guide.

Charlotte Braun, a character in the comic strip Peanuts, was killed off less than a year after being introduced after Charles Schulz received negative feedback about her. A letter to one of the child critics who had called for Braun's removal included a warning that the critics would bear the responsibility for the "death of an innocent child" and depicted Braun with an axe in her head. Braun's death was never explicitly addressed in officially published Peanuts media.

=== Video games ===
Wrinkly Kong, the wife of Cranky Kong, is killed off from Donkey Kong franchise after the events of Donkey Kong Country 3 (1996). She returns as a ghost in Donkey Kong 64 (1999), which can be found behind the doors with her face on them.

=== Anime and manga ===
Ikuko Tsukino, the mother of Usagi Tsukino, is killed off from the Sailor Moon franchise due to her actresses, Yūko Mizutani, dying of breast cancer in 2016, and Wakana Yamazaki, dying of chronic illness in 2026. She posthumously appears in the flashbacks in the future manga sequel and even future adaptations with archival footages and audios. Naoko Takeuchi included a tribute to the character.

=== LGBTQ characters ===
LGBT activists and fans have long criticized the tendency in U.S. media for LGBT characters, especially queer women, to be killed off or otherwise meet an unhappy fate more often than straight characters. This trope is known colloquially as "bury your gays" or "dead lesbian syndrome". In recent years, some LGBT showrunners and writers have made steps to avert this, such as ND Stevenson with She-Ra and the Princesses of Power.

== See also ==
- Spin off
