= Sandy's Country Christmas =

- SpongeBob SquarePants episode
- Promotional poster for the episode
- Episode no.: Season 14; Episode 13
- Directed by: Mark Caballero; Seamus Walsh
- Written by: Danny Giovannini
- Original air dates: October 15, 2024 (DVD); December 2, 2024 (TV)

Guest appearances
- Lewis Black as Santa Claus; Johnny Knoxville as Randy Cheeks; Craig Robinson as Pa Cheeks

Episode chronology
← Previous "Sheldon SquarePants"	Next → "Sammy Suckerfish"
- SpongeBob SquarePants season 14

"Sandy's Country Christmas" (Note: Promoted as SpongeBob & Sandy's Country Christmas) is the thirteenth and final episode of the fourteenth season, and the 306th overall episode of the American animated television series SpongeBob SquarePants. It made its cable and streaming debut on Nickelodeon and Paramount+ in the United States on December 2, 2024. In this episode, Sandy's family from Texas comes over to Bikini Bottom in a surprise visit to celebrate Christmas with her. It is the third SpongeBob episode animated through stop-motion instead of the usual 2D format, following "It's a SpongeBob Christmas!" and "The Legend of Boo-Kini Bottom".

The episode was produced in stop motion animation at Screen Novelties, and was directed by Mark Caballero and Seamus Walsh, two of the founders of the company. The animation style was inspired by those of the classic Rankin/Bass television specials. Written by Danny Giovannini, "Sandy's Country Christmas" features the series debut of Sandy's family who first appeared in the film, Saving Bikini Bottom: The Sandy Cheeks Movie (2024). Craig Robinson, Johnny Knoxville, and Grey Delisle reprise their voice roles. The episode received positive reviews from critics.

== Plot ==
It is the day before Christmas in Bikini Bottom and SpongeBob is assisting Sandy in her treedome with an experiment. The Cheeks family soon arrive to spend the holidays with Sandy in a surprise visit. SpongeBob goes off to the Krusty Krab for his Christmas Eve shift and Sandy and her family follow. At the restaurant, the Cheeks family performs a Christmas carol to the applause of customers and Sandy informs everyone that there will be a surprise at her treedome later that night. Sandy finishes off her experiment using an ornament she obtained from the Krusty Krab and later that evening, everyone in town arrives at her treedome. She demonstrates her work by dropping a sample in a Christmas tree, causing it to grow rapidly, while her family performs their circus act in the treedome. Rowdy and Rosie Cheeks, in their ploy to bring a surprise to Santa Claus, pour more of Sandy's experiment into the tree causing it to grow a considerable amount. Santa Claus flies straight into it causing him to fall to the ground.

Sandy checks on Santa after the fall who is now in a state of delirium. The townsfolk leave the scene frustrated and upset leading Sandy to feel at fault for ruining Christmas. Despite Ma and Pa Cheeks insistence that without Santa, the holidays is pointless, Granny Cheeks tells them a story of how they experienced Christmas without Santa. Granny's story inspires SpongeBob to rally the Cheeks family to deliver everyone's gifts themselves. SpongeBob, Sandy, and her family deliver all the gifts across town bringing back the holiday spirit. The sun rises as the bunch arrive back at the treedome with Santa back in a normal state. Santa thanks all of them for fixing his sleigh, as the townsfolk arrive to show their gratitude. The Cheeks family leave with the giant Christmas tree that Sandy gifts to them as a new home.

== Voice cast ==
"Actor/Actress"	Role
Tom Kenny	SpongeBob SquarePants; French Narrator; Additional voices
Bill Fagerbakke	Patrick Star; Additional voices
Rodger Bumpass	Squidward Tentacles; Additional voices
Clancy Brown	Mr. Krabs; Additional voices
Carolyn Lawrence	Sandy Cheeks; Additional voices
Mr. Lawrence	Plankton; Additional voices
Jill Talley	Karen; Additional voices
Lori Alan	Pearl Krabs
Lewis Black	Santa Claus
Mary Jo Catlett	Mrs. Puff
Grey Delisle	Granny Cheeks; Ma Cheeks; Rosie Cheeks; Rowdy Cheeks
Johnny Knoxville	Randy Cheeks
Craig Robinson	Pa Cheeks
Robin Walsh	Puppeteer

== Production ==
=== Announcement and development ===
At New York Comic Con in October 2024, it was announced that a new SpongeBob SquarePants stop-motion special episode, "Sandy's Country Christmas", would premiere on Nickelodeon and Paramount+ in December of that year. The episode was greenlit in celebration of the show's 25th anniversary and would mark the series debut of Sandy's family who first appeared in the film, Saving Bikini Bottom: The Sandy Cheeks Movie (2024). Craig Robinson, Johnny Knoxville, and Grey Delisle were set to reprise their voice roles from the film.

Like the previous stop-motion episodes, "It's a SpongeBob Christmas!" and "The Legend of Boo-Kini Bottom", the special was animated by Screen Novelties, who at that point had also provided some animation for the films and spin-off shows. Screen Novelties co-directors Mark Caballero and Seamus Walsh commented enjoying working with executive producers Vincent Waller and Marc Ceccarelli and the rest of the SpongeBob production team. Caballero described the show's staff as being receptive to their "dumb ideas" and Ceccarelli praised the guest animation studio's "willingness to throw in any technique to get the right shot." Waller called the studio the crew's favorite "alternate vendor" that they regularly look for excuses to work with.

=== Animation ===
The animation style was inspired by those of the classic Rankin/Bass television specials. Waller and Ceccarelli gave Screen Novelties the freedom to change up certain scenes from the boards to better suit stop-motion animation and the story. Advancements in stop-motion such as the Dragonframe software and 3D printing were incorporated to aid in production. It took three months to build 68 new puppets and 300 digitally printed replacement mouths for the special. The studio was tasked with interpreting Ceccarelli's designs for Sandy's family from Saving Bikini Bottom to stop motion.

For the episode, Screen Novelties built a SpongeBob dummy out of a cardboard box and destroyed it with sparklers in the studio's parking lot. Similarly, to capture a scene in which a wreath is actually lit on fire, the team took to the parking lot per the advice of the director of photography. The beginning of the special features Waller in the narrator suit for close up shots and alternates between a marionette puppet for long shots. In a scene where SpongeBob stares at his hand to remember lines during Sandy's presentation, a shot of the real yellow-gloved hand of animator Robin Walsh is featured. Inspired by "cheesy variety shows of the 60s and 70s", the special has Sandy's family be part of a jug band. Additionally, the studio added square dancing to the sledding scene at the episode's end. Ceccarellli enjoyed the inclusion of country music into the episode's production, feeling that it was something fresh and new for the series.

== Release and reception ==
"Sandy's Country Christmas" was part of the SpongeBob SquarePants: Another 100 Episodes DVD, which released on October 15, 2024. This was before the episode's cable and streaming premiere on Nickelodeon and Paramount+ in the United States on December 2, 2024.

Joel Keller of Decider commented that he enjoyed SpongeBob in stop-motion more than in its traditional 2D format, as it felt less frenetic and more cozy. He described the episode as a "stop-motion terrific", directing praise towards the songs and voice performances of guest stars, though criticizing the lack of Patrick Star scenes. Fernanda Camargo of Common Sense Media gave the episode a 3 out of 5 star rating. She praised the animation and songs but criticized the story for being lacking. Anime Superhero described the episode as "fine", praising the animation but deeming most other elements as serviceable and lacking compared to previous SpongeBob Christmas affairs.
