= The SpongeBob Movie: Search for SquarePants (soundtrack) =

2025 soundtrack by John Debney

The SpongeBob Movie: Search for SquarePants (Music from the Motion Picture)

Film score by John Debney
- Released: December 19, 2025
- Recorded: 2025
- Studios: Eastwood Scoring Stage, Warner Bros. Studios
- Genre: Film score
- Length: 43:02
- Labels: Milan; Paramount
- Producer: John Debney

John Debney chronology
In Your Dreams (2025)	The SpongeBob Movie: Search for SquarePants (2025)	You, Me & Tuscany (2026)

The SpongeBob Movie: Search for SquarePants (Music from the Motion Picture) is the soundtrack album to the 2025 animated film of the same name. The score was composed and conducted by John Debney, who had previously composed the score for The SpongeBob Movie: Sponge Out of Water (2015). It was released on December 19, 2025, by Milan Records and Paramount Music, coinciding with the film's theatrical release.

== Background ==
On April 17, 2025, John Debney was confirmed to be composing the score for The SpongeBob Movie: Search for SquarePants, after having previously composed the music for the 2015 film The SpongeBob Movie: Sponge Out of Water. The soundtrack was released on December 19, 2025, on MOD-providers by Milan Records and Paramount Music.

== Track listing ==
All music is composed by John Debney.

No.	Title	Length
1.	"The Dutchman's Story"	1:16
2.	"Call to Adventure"	2:50
3.	"Destiny Is Squeezing My Buns"	1:39
4.	"SpongeBuckler Awakens The Flying Dutchman"	3:10
5.	"The Celebratory Dutchman"	3:02
6.	"Demoted Squidward"	1:10
7.	"Barnacle Brain SpongeBob"	2:01
8.	"Batten Down the Hatches"	1:04
9.	"The Underworld and the Trail Ahead"	3:04
10.	"Rescue"	3:05
11.	"Keep Your Eye on the Prize"	0:55
12.	"Baggin' An Octopus"	2:02
13.	"Swashbuckler's Atlar"	2:11
14.	"Shiver Me Timbers"	1:14
15.	"Tricked You!"	5:11
16.	"The Dutchman's Deal"	2:32
17.	"Hold On SpongeBob"	6:27
Total length:		43:02

Other songs that were featured in the film but not included on the soundtrack include:

- Dead Kennedys - "Holiday in Cambodia"
- Yello - "Oh Yeah"
- Ice Spice – "Big Guy"
- Barbra Streisand – "The Way We Were"
- Jean Knight – "Mr. Big Stuff"

=== Personnel ===
- Music Editors: Jeff Carson, Heather Schmidt
- Orchestrations: Mark Graham
- Additional Orchestrations: Trevor Motycka, Mike Watts
- Score Recorder and Mixer: Shawn Murphy
- Score Conductors: Mark Graham, John Debney
- Music Score Coordinator: Lola Debney
- Score Production Supervisors: Stephanie Pereida, Natalie Jory, John Debney Jr.
- Technical Score Coordinator: Saun Santipreecha
- Technical Score Assistant: Ian Chen
- Executive Sound Staff: Jamie Olvera
- Musician Contractor: Dan Savant
- Vocal Contractor: Ron Colvard
