= Go Fetch! =

- SpongeBob SquarePants episode
- Title card
- Episode no.: Season 16; Episode 8b
- Directed by: Adam Paloian; Olov Burnam (animation)
- Written by: Adam Paloian
- Original air date: October 3, 2025
- Running time: 6 minutes

Episode chronology
← Previous "The Haunted Bucket"	Next → "Heart of Garbage"
- SpongeBob SquarePants season 16

"Go Fetch!" is the second segment in the eighth episode of the sixteenth season of the American animated television series SpongeBob SquarePants. It made its cable premiere on Nickelodeon in the United States on October 3, 2025. In the six-minute segment, SpongeBob chases after his pet snail Gary's toy ball after it plummets into the depths of an ominous oceanic trench.

Produced in computer animation by independent studio Pinreel Inc., the episode was written and directed by Adam Paloian, the founder of the studio and a former crew member on SpongeBob. The episode received positive reviews.

== Plot ==
SpongeBob, while playing fetch with his pet snail Gary in Jellyfish Fields, accidentally throws the ball into the depths of a nearby trench. Upon retrieving it, the pair are pursued by Bessy the anglerfish. After some mishaps, Gary is abducted by a UFO-like creature, so SpongeBob pilots a nearby barreleye fish to save him.

After finally catching up to Gary, the pair realize that Bessy is tailing them again, and they collide into a profusion of naval mines. The resulting explosion plummets SpongeBob and Gary deeper into the trench where they are greeted by a giant squid sharing a resemblance with Squidward. Using his similarly giant clarinet, the squid launches SpongeBob and Gary back to JellyFish Fields, with the ball in tow.

Their moment of jubilance is cut short when Bessy attacks SpongeBob. Gary replaces Bessy's damaged esca with the toy ball and the satisfied anglerfish regurgitates SpongeBob in response. SpongeBob and Gary realize that the memories they had with the ball are more important than the toy and hug.

== Voice cast ==
- Tom Kenny as SpongeBob SquarePants, Gary, Bessy
- Rodger Bumpass as Little Boy

== Production ==
The various stages of production of the episode. Top image: concept sketch (left) and final design (right), bottom image: a screenshot from the fully produced episode.

The writer and director of "Go Fetch!", Adam Paloian, founded the animation studio Pinreel Inc. with the goal of applying 2D animation principles he had learned in the past to 3D computer animation, in addition to experimenting with other forms of mixed media. After completing their first project, the 2023 music video for Tenacious D's "Video Games", Paloian set his sights on a new project to act as a testing ground for the studio. He eventually settled on doing something SpongeBob Squarepants-related because of his familiarity with the crew as an alumnus of the series himself. He pitched the short to executive producer and showrunner, Marc Ceccarelli, who approved the idea. Production began in 2024 and took about a year to wrap up.

With "Go Fetch!", Paloian aimed to honor the series' established visual identity while continuing and innovating with Pinreel's experimental style of CG animation direction. Particular influences were Max Fleischer's stereotypical sets and vintage View-Master dioramas. He decided to set the short in a Marianna Trench-esque environment to create a contrast between the energetic character animation and dark and moody atmosphere. Influenced by series creator Stephen Hillenburg's love for marine life, Paloian pulled from actual sea animals for the creatures in the trench while filtering them through "a stylized, storybook quality". As Pinreel is a small studio and the project was a huge undertaking for them, Paloian had to conduct an "extensive pre-planning" phase which resulted in an art direction bible.

The short was primarily animated in Autodesk Maya and rendered in Blender. Art directors, Lip Comarella and Jules Itzkoff, wanted the sets to resemble the raw and hand-painted aesthetic of the earliest SpongeBob episodes. Concept art was made directly in Blender which led to a unique workflow where the final environments were directly worked on while being conceived. Specific lighting effects were used to give the short a tangible, stop motion feel. The team were encouraged to "paint with the lighting" which helped inform the aesthetic. Rigging supervisor, James Correa ordered the team to alternate between generated rigs and ones designed by hand for more specific movements. Paloian and animation director, Olov Burnman, remarked that making sure the characters could perform extreme transformations was the most difficult animation hurdle on the project, with Bessy the anglerfish presenting a notable challenge.

== Release and reception ==
"Go Fetch!" was initially intended to be released in theaters as a short film, but instead ended up making its premiere through cable as a segment of the show in the United States on Nickelodeon, on October 3, 2025, along with its sister segment, "The Haunted Bucket". It was watched by 90 thousand viewers. The episode was screened at the Annecy International Animation Film Festival in June 2026.

Review blog website, Rhombus Rhota, praised the episode's visuals, saying that it was the best SpongeBob had ever looked in computer animation. They particularly highlighted the balance of on model and off model character acting, use of lighting, texturing, and the trench scenes for the contrast created between the dark atmosphere and the bright and colorful sea creatures.
