= Warner Bros. Studios =

Warner Bros. Studios may refer to:

- Warner Bros. Studios Burbank, Warner Bros. Studios located in Burbank, California
- Warner Bros. Studios Leavesden, Warner Bros. Studios located in Leavesden, England
- Old Warner Brothers Studio, now known as the Sunset Bronson Studios located in Hollywood, California
- Warner Bros. Studio Store, a line of Warner Bros. themed department stores

== See also ==
- Warner Bros. Studio Tours, an overview of the tours given at Warner Bros.
- Warner Bros. Studio Tour Hollywood, the tour given at Warner Bros. Studios in Burbank
- Warner Bros. Studio Tour London – The Making of Harry Potter, the Harry Potter tour given at the Warner Bros. Studios in Leavesden
