= SpongeBob SquarePants season 16 =

Season of television series

SpongeBob SquarePants
- Season 16
- DVD cover
- Showrunners: Marc Ceccarelli; Vincent Waller
- Starring: Tom Kenny; Bill Fagerbakke; Rodger Bumpass; Clancy Brown; Carolyn Lawrence; Mr. Lawrence; Jill Talley; Mary Jo Catlett; Lori Alan
- No. of episodes: 13 (22 segments)

Release
- Original network: Nickelodeon
- Original release: June 27, 2025 – June 5, 2026

Season chronology
- ← Previous; Season 15 Next → Season 17

The sixteenth season of the American animated television series SpongeBob SquarePants, created by former marine biologist and animator Stephen Hillenburg, premiered on Nickelodeon on June 27, 2025, and concluded on June 5, 2026. It consists of 13 episodes comprising 22 segments. The series chronicles the exploits and adventures of the title character and his various friends in the fictional underwater city of Bikini Bottom.

The SpongeBob SquarePants: The Complete Sixteenth Season DVD was released in region 1 on November 3, 2026.

== Production ==
The second half of the fourteenth season was split into a fifteenth season, with the first half of the fifteenth production season airing as the sixteenth season. The season features a two-part special episode, "SpongeBob and Patrick's Timeline Twist-Up", where characters from The Patrick Star Show time-travel and rewrite icon moments in the series' past. The second segment of the eighth episode of the season, "Go Fetch!", was animated in computer animation by independent studio, Pinreel Inc., and was written and directed by Adam Paloian, the founder of the studio and a former crew member on SpongeBob.

== Episodes ==
No. overall	No. in season	Title	Directed by (Note: Information is taken from the opening credits of each episode.)	Written by	Original release date	U.S. viewers (millions)
320	1	"Bizarro Bottom"	Supervising direction by : Ian Vazquez; Animation directed by : Michelle Bryan	Written by : Mike Bell; Storyboarded by : Brian Morante (director)	September 12, 2025	0.19
320	1	"Squidward's Tough Break"	Supervising direction by : Dave Cunningham; Animation directed by : Eric Bryan	Written by : Danny Giovannini; Storyboarded by : Kurt Snyder (director)	September 12, 2025	0.19
"Bizarro Bottom": After falling asleep on the ride home, SpongeBob enters Tankini Top, a topsy-turvy version of his hometown, and where SpongeTom lives, who's out visiting his parents.: Guest star: Al Yankovic as I.M. Poster the Pirate; "Squidward's Tough Break": Squidward is knocked out by a milkshake at the Salty Spitoon and gains a new, tough persona: 'Crazylegs'.
321	2	"Curse of the WereDoodle"	Supervising direction by : Sherm Cohen; Animation directed by : Michelle Bryan	Written by : Luke Brookshier; Storyboarded by : Zeus Cervas (director)	September 19, 2025	0.06
321	2	"Gorilla Suit Day"	Supervising direction by : Ian Vazquez; Animation directed by : Michelle Bryan	Written by : Mr. Lawrence; Storyboarded by : Dan Becker (director)	September 19, 2025	0.06
"Curse of the WereDoodle": SpongeBob is transformed into a WereDoodle after being bitten by an evil DoodleBob, spawning from pencil drawings in SpongeBob's notebook, and wreaks havoc all over town. Mr. Krabs, Mrs. Puff, Squidward, Patrick, Bubble Bass and Lady Upturn go after it, unaware of its true identity. "Gorilla Suit Day": On Gorilla Suit Day, SpongeBob and Patrick plan to prank the town with the former wearing a gorilla suit, but things go wrong when it turns out he's stuck in the suit thanks to a poor zippering by Patrick.
322	3	"Exchange Student Driver"	Supervising direction by : Dave Cunningham; Animation directed by : Eric Bryan	Written by : Mike Bell; Storyboarded by : Fred Osmond (director)	September 26, 2025	0.12
322	3	"The Kreepy Krab"	Supervising direction by : Sherm Cohen; Animation directed by : Michelle Bryan	Written by : Ben Kurzrock; Storyboarded by : Kurt Snyder (director)	September 26, 2025	0.12
"Exchange Student Driver": Mrs. Puff tries to get rid of SpongeBob by sending him to boating school in Klopnod, where his bad driving is right at home with the town's animal motorists. Meanwhile, Puff is given sea mule Peppercorn in exchange for SpongeBob, who proves to be her best student. "The Kreepy Krab": Slappy is fired after accidentally withering Nosferatu into dust on the job, but with the help of SpongeBob, Mr. Krabs employs him to work at the Krusty Krab as a server.
323	4	"SpongeBob and Patrick's Timeline Twist-Up"	Supervising direction by : Sherm Cohen, Dave Cunningham & Ian Vazquez; Animation directed by : Eric Bryan & Michelle Bryan	Written by : Luke Brookshier, Danny Giovannini, Andrew Goodman & Kaz; Storyboarded by : Dan Becker, Zeus Cervas, Fred Osmond & Kurt Snyder (directors)	June 27, 2025	0.09
324	5	"SpongeBob and Patrick's Timeline Twist-Up"	Supervising direction by : Sherm Cohen, Dave Cunningham & Ian Vazquez; Animation directed by : Eric Bryan & Michelle Bryan	Written by : Luke Brookshier, Danny Giovannini, Andrew Goodman & Kaz; Storyboarded by : Dan Becker, Zeus Cervas, Fred Osmond & Kurt Snyder (directors)	June 27, 2025	0.09
Patrick's time closet malfunctions, causing SpongeBob's history of events from the first season to be rewritten by the Star family. SpongeBob, Patrick, and Squidina travel back in time to the events of "Rock Bottom", "Ripped Pants", "Neptune's Spatula", and "Help Wanted" to bring Patrick's family back to the present time and get SpongeBob's memories back.
325	6	"Laundro-Madness"	Supervising direction by : Dave Cunningham; Animation directed by : Eric Bryan	Written by : Mr. Lawrence; Storyboarded by : Zeus Cervas (director)	October 10, 2025	0.12
325	6	"Hog Huntin'"	Supervising direction by : Sherm Cohen; Animation directed by : Michelle Bryan	Written by : Mike Bell; Storyboarded by : Dan Becker (director)	October 17, 2025 (Note: This episode was released on iTunes on October 11, 2025.)	0.09
"Laundro-Madness": It's a day at The Wash!, the Bikini Bottom laundromat. "Hog Huntin'": SpongeBob and Patrick must find Old Man Jenkins' hog Beulah after the two leave the barn door open.
326	7	"SpongeBob TrashPants"	Supervising direction by : Ian Vazquez; Animation directed by : Michelle Bryan	Written by : Kaz; Storyboarded by : Fred Osmond (director)	October 24, 2025 (Note: This episode was released on Fandango at Home on October 18, 2025.)	N/A
326	7	"Krusty Kafeteria"	Supervising direction by : Dave Cunningham; Animation directed by : Eric Bryan	Written by : Andrew Goodman; Storyboarded by : Kurt Snyder (director)	October 24, 2025	N/A
"SpongeBob TrashPants": SpongeBob makes it his duty to pick up all the trash in Goo Lagoon. "Krusty Kafeteria": Pearl convinces Mr. Krabs to let her and SpongeBob make Krabby Patties for the high school lunch, but a feisty and traditionalist lunch lady Lenore (Cree Summer) makes the task incredibly challenging.
327	8	"The Haunted Bucket"	Supervising direction by : Sherm Cohen and Ian Vazquez; Animation directed by : Michelle Bryan	Written by : Danny Giovannini; Storyboarded by : Dan Becker & Zeus Cervas (directors)	October 3, 2025	0.09
327	8	"Go Fetch!"	Adam Paloian; Animation directed by : Olov Burman	Written by : Adam Paloian; Storyboarded by : Benjamin Arcand, C.H. Greenblatt & Jason Reicher	October 3, 2025	0.09
"The Haunted Bucket": In this two-part episode, SpongeBob, Patrick, and Squidward trudge into the Chum Bucket on Halloween night, where Plankton and Karen try to give them a scare. After Plankton accidentally sets off a machine and the ground erodes, the Chum Bucket unleashes gaggles of haunted creatures from the underworld into the town, and it's up to the gang to stop them. "Go Fetch!": In the first ever CGI episode of the series heralded by Pinreel Inc., Gary's ball accidentally falls down a trench, and it's up to him and SpongeBob to retrieve it, while avoiding the various monsters along the way.
328	9	"Heart of Garbage"	Supervising direction by : Dave Cunningham; Animation directed by : Eric Bryan	Written by : Mike Bell; Storyboarded by : Fred Osmond (director)	November 7, 2025 (Note: This episode was released on FuboTV on November 1, 2025.)	0.09
328	9	"Near-Mint Plankton"	Supervising direction by : Sherm Cohen; Animation directed by : Michelle Bryan	Written by : Luke Brookshier; Storyboarded by : Kurt Snyder (director)	November 7, 2025	0.09
"Heart of Garbage": In an homage to the film Apocalypse Now and the book Heart of Darkness, Squidward is trapped in garbage in his house after knocking down on the sanitation workers. Stuck for six months, Squidward goes insane. SpongeBob and Patrick must search for Squidward within a deep garbage jungle that has situated around his accommodation. "Near-Mint Plankton": Plankton seeks to obtain a Krabby Patty from Bubble Bass, but things go wrong when he gets himself trapped inside the nerd's figurine archive. Meanwhile, when Karen notices Plankton is gone, she and SpongeBob look for him.
329	10	"Pardon My Wand"	Supervising direction by : Ian Vazquez; Animation directed by : Michelle Bryan	Written by : Mr. Lawrence; Storyboarded by : Zeus Cervas (director)	November 14, 2025	0.06
329	10	"Stupor-stition"	Supervising direction by : Dave Cunningham; Animation directed by : Eric Bryan	Written by : Kaz; Storyboarded by : Dan Becker (director)	November 14, 2025	0.06
"Pardon My Wand": SpongeBob and a magician, Howdini, accidentally swap each other's wand and pen for each other after the sponge receives an autograph from him following a magic showing he attends with Sandy, with the wand getting stuck in his holes; this leads SpongeBob to unintentionally create magical havoc around town. When the magician seeks to get the wand back, he wants to rip SpongeBob open, so Sandy's got to protect him using the sponge as her "magic wand," even if she doesn't understand magic. "Stupor-stition": Mr. Krabs fears bad luck on Friday the 13th after a destructive incident from his old navy days.
330	11	"Pigskin Pearl"	Supervising direction by : Sherm Cohen and Ian Vazquez; Animation directed by : Michelle Bryan	Written by : Andrew Goodman; Storyboarded by : Fred Osmond & Kurt Snyder (directors)	November 28, 2025	0.07
After noticing her strength on the football field during a cheer session taken too far, Coach Cod convinces Pearl to join Bikini Bottom's struggling high school football team, the Barnacles, where she becomes a star player. She leads the team to unwavering victory, and begins to grow an ego, but her match is met when a gang of criminals, the New Kelp City Delinquents, are let out to play against the team. Meanwhile, Mr. Krabs tries to prop up advertising for the Krusty Krab with a new cheer, and Perch Perkins and Patrick serve as commentators for the game. Patrick eventually hijacks the role, leading Perch to go mad and embark on various attempts to get his job back.: Guest star: Craig T. Nelson as Coach Cod
331	12	"The Green Tentacle"	Supervising direction by : Dave Cunningham; Animation directed by : Eric Bryan	Written by : Danny Giovannini; Storyboarded by : Zeus Cervas (director)	May 15, 2026	0.13
331	12	"Happy Krabby Birthday"	Supervising direction by : Sherm Cohen; Animation directed by : Michelle Bryan	Written by : Kaz; Storyboarded by : Dan Becker (director)	May 22, 2026 (Note: This episode was initially released on Amazon Prime Video and Fandango at Home on May 16, 2026.)	0.10
"The Green Tentacle": When Sandy discovers that her tree is starting to rot, she enlists Squidward's help to save it. However, his "process" doesn't seem to be helping in any way. "Happy Krabby Birthday": After learning that Mr. Krabs dislikes their gifts on his birthday, SpongeBob and Squidward search for the perfect gift for him.
332	13	"Karate Pals"	Supervising direction by : Ian Vazquez; Animation directed by : Michelle Bryan	Written by : Luke Brookshier; Storyboarded by : Fred Osmond (director)	May 29, 2026	0.15
332	13	"Karen's Klatch"	Supervising direction by : Dave Cunningham; Animation directed by : Eric Bryan	Written by : Mr. Lawrence; Storyboarded by : Kurt Synder (director)	June 5, 2026	0.17
"Karate Pals": After Sandy teaches the Gal Pals karate, she soon regrets it when they start using it for granted, and needs SpongeBob's help to reverse it. "Karen's Klatch": When Karen locks Plankton inside his lab while she has a gathering with her computer friends, Tandy, Bim, and Zip, Plankton decides to instigate by hijacking Tandy's body.

== DVD release ==
The DVD boxset for season sixteen was released by Paramount Home Entertainment and Nickelodeon in the United States and Canada on November 3, 2026.

SpongeBob SquarePants: The Complete Sixteenth Season
Set details			Special features
13 episodes (22 segment episodes); 2-disc set; 1.78:1 aspect ratio; Languages: English (Dolby Digital 5.1); Spanish (Dolby Stereo); French (Dolby Stereo)			
Release dates
Region 1	Region 2	Region 4	
November 3, 2026	TBA	TBA	
Episodes
Disc 1: "Bizarro Bottom", "Squidward's Tough Break", "Curse of the WereDoodle", "Gorilla Suit Day", "Exchange Student Driver", "The Kreepy Krab", "SpongeBob and Patrick's Timeline Twist-Up", "Laundro-Madness", "Hog Huntin'", "SpongeBob TrashPants", and "Krusty Kafeteria"; Disc 2: "The Haunted Bucket", "Go Fetch!", "Heart of Garbage", "Near-Mint Plankton", "Pardon My Wand", "Stupor-stition", "Pigskin Pearl", "The Green Tentacle", "Happy Krabby Birthday", "Karate Pals", and "Karen's Klatch"
