= The Best Day Ever =

2006 album by Tom Kenny and Andy Paley

SpongeBob SquarePants: The Best Day Ever

Soundtrack album by SpongeBob & The Hi-Seas
- Released: September 12, 2006
- Recorded: 2004
- Genres: Pop; surf; garage rock; power pop
- Length: 58:01
- Label: Nick Records
- Producer: Andy Paley

SpongeBob & The Hi-Seas chronology
The Yellow Album (2005)	SpongeBob SquarePants: The Best Day Ever (2006)	SpongeBob's Greatest Hits (2009)

Professional ratings
Review scores
Source	Rating
AllMusic	4/5 stars
Baltimore City Paper	positive
Common Sense Media	4/5 stars
Entertainment Weekly	A−
IGN	7/10 stars

SpongeBob SquarePants: The Best Day Ever is the fourth soundtrack by the voice cast members of SpongeBob SquarePants. Written by Tom Kenny and musician and producer Andy Paley, it features musical cameos by Brian Wilson, Tommy Ramone, Flaco Jiménez, and others. The Best Day Ever album was released on September 12, 2006, to positive reviews from critics. Two months later, the episode the title soundtrack is based on aired in November 2006.

== Production ==
"We hired all these guys from the Wrecking Crew. James Burton plays guitar on it. Half the people from Pet Sounds are on Best Day Ever, just because we wanted to! But they wanted to, more importantly, because we probably couldn't have afforded them if they were charging what they're worth."

— Tom Kenny

The album The Best Day Ever was written by SpongeBob's voice actor, Tom Kenny, and producer Andy Paley. Featuring 27 tracks, it was influenced by 1960s pop music. The record's numerous skits refer to a freeform radio station called WH_{2}O. Kenny's inspiration for the song "My Tighty Whiteys" was "underwear humor". Kenny said "Underwear humor is always a surefire laugh-getter with kids [...] Just seeing a character that odd wearing really prosaic, normal, Kmart, three-to-a-pack underwear is a funny drawing [...] We thought it was funny to make a really lush, beautiful love song to his underwear."

In addition to the cast, the Beach Boys' Brian Wilson, NRBQ's Al Anderson, Joey Spampinato, Tom Ardolino, and Terry Adams, and Tommy Ramone of the Ramones were musical guest artists. Kenny said, on the musical cameos, that "We thought they would spread some magic dust on it. And although this is just a weird little cartoon record, I didn't want to have today's equivalent of Kajagoogoo or Men Without Hats on it." He opined that "the people we got" are "kind of timeless." Other musicians who contributed to the album were Dave Allen, Don Allen, Mandy Barnett, Jerry Blavat, Mike Bolger, Corky Hale, Lisa Hammon, Flaco Jiménez, James King, Tommy Morgan, Jillinda Palmer, Herb Pedersen, Nino Tempo, Mike Uhler, and Jeremy Wakefield.

Brian Wilson provided backing vocals for the song "Doin' the Krabby Patty". Originally, Kenny and Paley were working on a "Brian Wilson-esque" song with "Brian Wilson-esque" background vocals on it. Kenny said "and at the last minute, we had this opportunity to reach out to him and ask if he'd do it [...] But Brian's people said he was going on to Hawaii the next day with his wife and kids, and then going on the road." Eventually, Kenny got a call from Wilson saying that "I loved the idea." Elvis Presley's guitarist James Burton performed the guitar in the song "You Will Obey". Kenny said "One of our hidden Easter eggs that hopefully more than three people in the world will get is during the guitar solo when Plankton says 'Take it, James', which was what Elvis said in every one of those concert movies."

== Reception ==
The album received mostly positive reviews. AllMusic gave the album four stars. In his review for the IGN, Spence D. gave the album a 7/10. He said, "parents who grew up in the late '50s and '60s will get a kick out of the musical tributes to the music of those eras and perhaps listen along with their kids during a family fun time extravaganza." Geoffrey Himes of the Baltimore City Paper said "How do little kids respond to this record? I wouldn't know; there aren't any little kids in my house. You don't have to be a parent to enjoy the killer hooks and lush harmonies on this disc. All you need is the courage to ignore the raised eyebrows of your friends." Kerwin So of Common Sense Media gave the album a score of 4/5. However, So claimed that the album is full of consumerism and said "Parents need to know that although the physical packaging of this CD contains a lot of advertisements for other SpongeBob products, the songs themselves contain very positive content and steer clear of commercialism."

Chris Willman of the Entertainment Weekly opined that the album is "not quite a teenage symphony to God." He called the song "My Tighty Whiteys" "the most obvious nod to the Pet Sounds sound." According to him, "two of the best songs are garage-rock anthems" which includes "Under My Rock" and "You Will Obey". Willman said that Plankton's performance in the latter "sounds like a little like Eric Burdon, from the Animals, turned fascist." He gave it an "A−" rating and recommended it for ages "4 to... 94!" In a 2014 review, The A.V. Club ranked The Best Day Ever album No. 3 in their list of "13 novelty albums recorded by TV characters". The publication called it "a charming throwback" when "TV character novelty albums have faded away in recent years."

== Track listing ==
All tracks are written by Tom Kenny and Andy Paley.

No.	Title	Length
1.	"WH_{2}0 Radio Show Open"	0:34
2.	"The Best Day Ever" (Performed by SpongeBob SquarePants)	3:00
3.	"SpongeBob and The Hi-Seas In Concert"	0:43
4.	"Employee of the Month" (Performed by SpongeBob SquarePants)	3:31
5.	"Patrick Turn Your Radio Down"	0:48
6.	"Under My Rock" (Performed by Patrick Star)	3:15
7.	"Mrs. Puff's Boating School Ad"	0:50
8.	"Where's Gary" (Performed by SpongeBob SquarePants and Gary the Snail)	3:05
9.	"The Tuneful Tuna's Advice"	0:24
10.	"Barnacles" (Performed by SpongeBob & the Hi-Seas)	3:39
11.	"Pearl Krabs a.k.a. Caller #5"	1:07
12.	"My Tighty Whiteys" (Performed by SpongeBob SquarePants)	2:53
13.	"Dover Sole With Bikini Bottom Weather"	0:36
14.	"Ridin' the Hook" (Performed by SpongeBob SquarePants and Patrick Star)	2:58
15.	"Squidward's Request"	0:35
16.	"Superior" (Performed by Squidward Tentacles)	2:55
17.	"Krusty Krab Radio Spot"	0:22
18.	"Doin' the Krabby Patty" (Performed by SpongeBob SquarePants and Patrick Star)	3:07
19.	"Plankton Jams the Signal"	0:58
20.	"You Will Obey" (Performed by Plankton)	3:04
21.	"That Was Weird"	0:14
22.	"Who Wants to Race Me" (Performed by Sandy Cheeks)	1:21
23.	"The Spotlight Continues..."	0:17
24.	"Fishin' for Money" (Performed by Mr. Krabs)	3:53
25.	"SpongeBob and The Hi-Seas Drop By WH_{2}0"	1:25
26.	"Bikini Bottom/Rock Bottom" (Performed by SpongeBob & the Hi-Seas)	7:12
27.	"The Best Day Ever/Bonus Material"	5:15
Total length:		58:01

== Chart positions ==
Chart (2006)	Peak position
US Top Kid Audio (Billboard)	9
