= SpongeBob SquarePants season 15 =

Season of television series

SpongeBob SquarePants
- Season 15
- DVD cover
- Showrunners: Marc Ceccarelli; Vincent Waller
- Starring: Tom Kenny; Bill Fagerbakke; Rodger Bumpass; Clancy Brown; Carolyn Lawrence; Mr. Lawrence; Jill Talley; Mary Jo Catlett; Lori Alan
- No. of episodes: 13 (26 segments)

Release
- Original network: Nickelodeon
- Original release: July 24, 2024 – June 20, 2025

Season chronology
- ← Previous; Season 14 Next → Season 16

The fifteenth season of the American animated television series SpongeBob SquarePants, created by former marine biologist and animator Stephen Hillenburg, began airing on Nickelodeon in the United States on July 24, 2024, and concluded on June 20, 2025. It consists of 13 episodes. The series chronicles the exploits and adventures of the title character and his various friends in the fictional underwater city of Bikini Bottom.

The SpongeBob SquarePants: The Complete Fifteenth Season DVD was released in region 1 on November 11, 2025.

== Production ==
The season was first announced on September 29, 2023, for 26 half-hour episodes. On September 11, 2024, it was revealed that the second half of season 14 was split into a fifteenth season bringing the number of episodes for the former to 13. The reason for the split was "to keep their sizes more consistent with the season lengths currently consumed on streaming where all shows ultimately end". Later that same month, Paramount's Global Content website confirmed that the season will now consist of 20 episodes. It would later be shortened to 13 episodes in order for the sixteenth season to feature the fifteenth production season episodes.

== Episodes ==
The episodes are ordered below according to Nickelodeon's packaging order, and not their original production or broadcast order.

No. overall	No. in season	Title	Directed by (Note: Information is taken from the opening credits of each episode.)	Written by	Original release date	U.S. viewers (millions)
307	1	"Sammy Suckerfish"	Supervising direction by : Dave Cunningham; Animation directed by : Andrew Overtoom	Written by : Mr. Lawrence; Storyboarded by : Dan Becker (director)	July 24, 2024	0.14
307	1	"Big League Bob"	Supervising direction by : Sherm Cohen; Animation directed by : Michelle Bryan	Written by : Kaz; Storyboarded by : Fred Osmond (director)	July 25, 2024	0.12
"Sammy Suckerfish": The inside of the Krusty Krab is coated in green gunk because of a recent sewer dwellers' convention held there, so Mr. Krabs gives SpongeBob the task of cleaning the Krusty Krab, not allowing him to leave until the place is completely clean. With the help of magical janitor Sammy Suckerfish, he and SpongeBob lick the entire place clean with their tongues, but Sammy later gets carried away cleaning the place and ends up swallowing Krabs' safe and the secret formula in the process.: Guest star: Richard Ayoade as Sammy Suckerfish; "Big League Bob": The restaurant manager visits the Krusty Krab and recruits SpongeBob to be a chef at his stadium restaurant. SpongeBob competes in cooking tests against other chefs, overcoming sabotage attempts to showcase his talent. Despite initially leaving the competition, SpongeBob returns to win over the crowd with his Krabby Patties. Ultimately, the manager stops the competition, but SpongeBob's success and popularity among the customers are highlighted in a chaotic and explosive finale.
308	2	"UpWard"	Supervising direction by : Ian Vazquez	Written by : Andrew Goodman; Storyboarded by : Kurt Snyder (director)	December 3, 2024	0.04
308	2	"Unidentified Flailing Octopus"	Supervising direction by : Dave Cunningham; Animation directed by : Eric Bryan, Michelle Bryan and Andrew Overtoom	Written by : Mr. Lawrence; Storyboarded by : Zeus Cervas (director)	December 5, 2024	0.09
"UpWard": Lady Upturn and Regigilled are at the art museum looking for new items for Upturn's home. After not liking some of the museum's exhibits, Upturn takes a walk at Jellyfish Fields, where she sees Squidward playing his clarinet and causing a disturbance. Upturn, actually liking Squidward's music, introduces Squidward to her mansion, where Squidward writes many symphonies. "Unidentified Flailing Octopus": Perch Perkins reports about an alien hoax, saying there is an extremely small chance that aliens are real, which SpongeBob and Patrick immediately believe, so they put on tinfoil hats and flashlights to try and find the aliens. Squidward shows up in an alien mask then removes it, convincing SpongeBob and Patrick that aliens aren't real. When SpongeBob and Patrick leave to play superheroes instead, a UFO arrives with real aliens who come and abduct Squidward.
309	3	"Bad Luck Bob"	Supervising direction by : Sherm Cohen; Animation directed by : Michelle Bryan	Written by : Luke Brookshier; Storyboarded by : Dan Becker (director)	December 9, 2024	N/A
309	3	"The Sandman Cometh"	Supervising direction by : Ian Vazquez	Written by : Danny Giovannini; Storyboarded by : Brian Morante and Fred Osmond (director)	December 11, 2024	N/A
"Bad Luck Bob": SpongeBob puts on his lucky tie clip before work and ends up having a good luck streak at work. After SpongeBob trips around on a bowling ball in his house, he wakes up the next day to find that his lucky tie clip is missing, and ends up having a bad luck streak throughout the day as a result, while Squidward tries to tell SpongeBob the luck is all in his head. "The Sandman Cometh": After Patrick ends up sleeping for a week at Jellyfish Fields, he is unable to stay asleep when he goes to bed that night, so he resorts to many methods to get himself to fall asleep. After many unsuccessful attempts, SpongeBob tells Patrick he needs the Sandman to help him fall asleep, which Patrick ends up hallucinating.
310	4	"Biscuit Ballyhoo"	Supervising direction by : Dave Cunningham; Animation directed by : Eric Bryan, Michelle Bryan and Andrew Overtoom	Written by : Andrew Goodman; Storyboarded by : Kurt Snyder (director)	December 13, 2024	N/A
310	4	"Student Driver Survivor"	Supervising direction by : Sherm Cohen; Animation directed by : Michelle Bryan	Written by : Kaz; Storyboarded by : Zeus Cervas (director)	December 17, 2024	0.07
"Biscuit Ballyhoo": Sandy and her Science Scouts SpongeBob, Squidina, and Pearl are selling biscuits to fund a trip to Mars. When Mr. Krabs finds out, he forms his own scout troop to sell Krusty Doodles, and makes a deal with the other group in which whoever sells less has to stop selling forever. The selling between both scout troops then turns into an all-out competition. "Student Driver Survivor": A new driving instructor, Acceleration T. Greenlight opens his "Greenlight Driving School" where he promises a driver's license to anyone who can drive around the block at half the cost of Mrs. Puff's Boating School, and every student except for SpongeBob heads on over to his school. Mrs. Puff finds a lot of overdue bills in her mailbox, so to stay in business, she has to rely on SpongeBob and charge him for driving lessons every day.: Guest stars: Jon Lovitz as Acceleration T. Greenlight, Carlos Alazraqui as Scooter
311	5	"Wiener Takes All"	Supervising direction by : Ian Vazquez	Written by : Danny Giovannini; Storyboarded by : Dan Becker (director)	December 19, 2024	0.13
311	5	"Stuck in an Elevator"	Supervising direction by : Dave Cunningham; Animation directed by : Eric Bryan	Written by : Mr. Lawrence; Storyboarded by : Fred Osmond (director)	December 24, 2024	0.12
"Wiener Takes All": After an overwhelming day of work at the Krusty Krab, Squidward sees a commercial for Weenie Hut Jr's saying that robots will do all the work. This greatly interests Squidward, who immediately takes the job. After making some changes to Weenie Hut Jr's and repairing the robots, Squidward is able to "manage" the place while relaxing in his office. When Squidward is flown to Weenie Hut Sr's after he's promised a promotion, he learns that the "upper management" course is really getting turned into a robot for efficiency, and tries to escape. "Stuck in an Elevator": Squidward has to return his affirmation book before the deadline, so he heads to the library and takes the elevator to the top floor to get to the book return center. However, SpongeBob and Patrick tag along the elevator ride, and their antics cause Squidward to get himself stuck in the elevator with them, so he has to escape the elevator in time before the deadline.: Guest star: Jeffrey Combs as Wally
312	6	"Squidness Protection"	Supervising direction by : Sherm Cohen; Animation directed by : Michelle Bryan	Written by : Luke Brookshier; Storyboarded by : Kurt Snyder (director)	February 14, 2025	0.18
312	6	"Dome Alone"	Supervising direction by : Ian Vazquez; Animation directed by : Eric Bryan	Written by : Andrew Goodman; Storyboarded by : Zeus Cervas (director)	February 14, 2025	0.18
"Squidness Protection": Squidward is living a wonderful new life in witness protection in New Kelp City under the name John Dolphin, as a result of being offered it after telling a cop about the robber, Elmer Eraser. His new life in witness protection is eventually discovered by SpongeBob and Patrick after they tracked down his scent when noticing he's not at work, as they tag along to try to keep him safe from Elmer Eraser. "Dome Alone": On her way home from the Nut Barn, Sandy trips and ends up breaking her helmet, so she calls to get a new helmet delivered, which would take six to eight weeks. Stuck in her dome all alone, Sandy calls up her friends, only for them to be all busy, so she decides to visit them remotely using drones. When Sandy suspects Plankton is up to no good, she gets Patrick to investigate Plankton's doings with the drone.
313	7	"Wary Gary"	Supervising direction by : Dave Cunningham; Animation directed by : Eric Bryan	Written by : Danny Giovannini; Storyboarded by : Dan Becker (director)	February 21, 2025	0.10
313	7	"Pinned"	Supervising direction by : Sherm Cohen; Animation directed by : Michelle Bryan	Written by : Mike Bell; Storyboarded by : Fred Osmond (director)	February 21, 2025	0.10
"Wary Gary": It is the day of Gary's veterinary appointment, but Gary doesn't want to go, so SpongeBob does tricks to attempt to trick Gary into getting in his pet carrier, which includes taking them both on a vacation, and a fake invitation to a party. When both tricks fail, SpongeBob ends up chasing Gary around to get him to his pet carrier. "Pinned": When SpongeBob is working out with his exercise equipment, SpongeBob decides to push his weight-lifting to the limit by adding two more plush toys to his barbell, which causes him to end up getting pinned underneath it. With SpongeBob pinned, he tries to call for help in various ways in hopes that he would be freed from the barbell pinning him down.
314	8	"Jeffy T's Prankwell Emporium"	Supervising direction by : Ian Vazquez; Animation directed by : Michelle Bryan	Written by : Danny Giovannini; Storyboarded by : Kurt Snyder (director)	February 28, 2025	0.18
314	8	"A Taste of Plankton"	Supervising direction by : Dave Cunningham; Animation directed by : Eric Bryan	Written by : Luke Brookshier; Storyboarded by : Zeus Cervas (director)	February 28, 2025	0.18
"Jeffy T's Prankwell Emporium": Squidward wakes up one morning to a disguised figure at his door selling him pranks and gags, which turns out to be his father, Jeffy Tentacles, who is staying over for a few days. Jeffy brings in more pranks and gags and opens up his own Prankwell Emporium close to Squidward's house, much to the annoyance and disgust of Squidward and the excitement of SpongeBob and Patrick.: Guest star: Henry Winkler as Jeffy Tentacles; "A Taste of Plankton": After watching a sea life documentary showing a parasite finding a new home by attaching itself to a fish's mouth, Plankton gets an idea to attach himself to SpongeBob's tongue to try and get a taste of the Krabby Patty secret formula. Plankton glues himself to SpongeBob's tongue to try and accomplish this, which results in SpongeBob not being able to taste anything.
315	9	"Smartificial Intelligence"	Supervising direction by : Sherm Cohen; Animation directed by : Michelle Bryan	Written by : Andrew Goodman; Storyboarded by : Dan Becker (director)	March 7, 2025	0.07
315	9	"Firehouse Bob"	Supervising direction by : Ian Vazquez; Animation directed by : Michelle Bryan	Written by : Kaz; Storyboarded by : Fred Osmond (director)	March 7, 2025	0.07
"Smartificial Intelligence": On Bikini Bottom News, Perch Perkins receives a report that he has been fired and replaced with a news reporting robot, Newsbot 2000. Under SpongeBob's suggestion, Perch gets jobs at Barg-N-Mart and the Krusty Krab, in which he gets fired from both because he interviewed the customers instead of serving them. SpongeBob begs BBTV to rehire Perch, which results in a "news-off" between him and Newsbot 2000. "Firehouse Bob": After witnessing Larry rescuing Gary from a tree, SpongeBob decides that he wants to be a firefighter. SpongeBob, along with Patrick and Squidward who eventually join in, are trained by Larry to become volunteer firefighters, as they follow the instructions in their own comical ways.
316	10	"Pablum Plankton"	Supervising direction by : Dave Cunningham; Animation directed by : Eric Bryan	Written by : Mr. Lawrence; Storyboarded by : Kurt Snyder (director)	March 14, 2025	0.09
316	10	"MuseBob ModelPants"	Supervising direction by : Sherm Cohen; Animation directed by : Michelle Bryan	Written by : Mike Bell; Storyboarded by : Zeus Cervas (director)	March 14, 2025	0.09
"Pablum Plankton": SpongeBob and Karen look at Plankton's baby photos, and Karen submits them to Baleen Baby's Cutest Baby contest. Plankton wins the contest and ends up being the face of Baleen Baby baby food, gaining him popularity and making everybody he encounters unusually nice to him. Plankton recruits SpongeBob to put an end to this popularity he gained. "MuseBob ModelPants": Squidward is painting in his yard, until SpongeBob crashes into the painting, causing it to depict him. Art dealer Peggy Groupenheim ends up loving the painting, paying Squidward a large sum of money and telling him to paint more pictures of SpongeBob. SpongeBob becomes Squidward's muse, where Squidward relies on SpongeBob's poses to produce more paintings.
317	11	"Delivery of Doom" "Delivery of DOOM!"	Supervising direction by : Ian Vazquez; Animation directed by : Michelle Bryan	Written by : Danny Giovannini; Storyboarded by : Dan Becker (director)	June 6, 2025 (Note: This episode was initially supposed to air on March 21, 2025, but was pulled. Despite this, iTunes and Amazon Prime Video would release the episode on March 22, 2025.)	0.10
317	11	"My Father the Boat"	Supervising direction by : Dave Cunningham; Animation directed by : Eric Bryan	Written by : Mr. Lawrence; Storyboarded by : Fred Osmond (director)	June 6, 2025	0.10
"Delivery of Doom": The League of E.V.I.L. watch an advertisement for the Krusty Krab's delivery service where Mr. Krabs says the food will be free if it arrives in ten or more minutes. Mr. Krabs tasks SpongeBob to make a delivery to E.V.I.L.'s lair, and as SpongeBob tries to make the delivery there, the villains use their powers to attempt to make SpongeBob late so they can get their food for free. "My Father the Boat": Pearl wants Mr. Krabs to buy her an expensive boat for her birthday. Mr. Krabs, not wanting to spend a huge sum of money, finds a broken down version of the boat Pearl wanted, and asks SpongeBob to fix it up to make it look perfect. After the boat is fixed up, the boat has no engine, so SpongeBob and Mr. Krabs attempt to manually control the boat from the inside.
318	12	"Who's Afraid of Mr. Snippers?"	Supervising direction by : Sherm Cohen; Animation directed by : Michelle Bryan	Written by : Luke Brookshier; Storyboarded by : Kurt Snyder (director)	June 13, 2025	0.10
318	12	"A Fish Called Sandy"	Supervising direction by : Ian Vazquez; Animation directed by : Michelle Bryan	Written by : Mike Bell; Storyboarded by : Zeus Cervas (director)	June 13, 2025	0.10
"Who's Afraid of Mr. Snippers?": Plankton and Squidward are both writing stage plays, which both form a complete script, so the two decide to work together on the play. After they argue over who should play the villain Mr. Snippers, Karen decides to give SpongeBob the role, and motivates SpongeBob to recite his lines properly. "A Fish Called Sandy": Sandy shows SpongeBob her new invention, the Fish-U-Up Machine, and using that invention, replaces her squirrel DNA with a fish's DNA, allowing her to breathe like a real sea creature and experience the ocean. After turning into a fish, Sandy decides to fully explore the underwater world with SpongeBob, including going back to several moments from the first season.
319	13	"Making Waves"	Supervising direction by : Dave Cunningham; Animation directed by : Eric Bryan	Written by : Kaz; Storyboarded by : Dan Becker (director)	June 20, 2025	0.13
319	13	"Captain Quasar: The Next Iteration"	Supervising direction by : Sherm Cohen; Animation directed by : Michelle Bryan	Written by : Andrew Goodman; Storyboarded by : Fred Osmond (director)	June 20, 2025	0.13
"Making Waves": Plankton ends up blowing up the Krusty Krab when trying to blow up the safe which had the secret formula inside, causing Mr. Krabs to want to take a vacation from Plankton. Mr. Krabs books a sea cruise to try to get away from Plankton, but they both end up getting the same room, forcing them to have to spend time together. "Captain Quasar: The Next Iteration": SpongeBob, Patrick, and Squidina see a commercial for a Captain Quasar fan club located at the back of Near Mint Comic Books, and decide to join the club. The fan club turns out to be for the reboot of Captain Quasar, and upon finding that out, SpongeBob and Squidina decide to make their own Captain Quasar fan club dedicated to the original series.

== Specials ==
Title	Written by (Note: Information is taken from the closing credits of each episode.)	Original release date	Prod. code	U.S. viewers (millions)
"Beneath the Bun: Krabby Patty Secrets Special"	Ben Kurzrock	December 23, 2024	866	0.10
Perch Perkins talks about the variations and secrets of Krabby Patties, their scandals, and how they've become successful, through clips from previous episodes of the series.

== DVD release ==
The DVD boxset for season fifteen was released by Paramount Home Entertainment and Nickelodeon in the United States and Canada on November 11, 2025.

SpongeBob SquarePants: The Complete Fifteenth Season
Set details			Special features
13 episodes (26 segment episodes); 2-disc set; 1.78:1 aspect ratio; Languages: English (Dolby Digital 5.1); Spanish (Dolby Stereo); French (Dolby Stereo)			
Release dates
Region 1	Region 2	Region 4	
November 11, 2025	TBA	TBA	
Episodes
Disc 1: "Sammy Suckerfish", "Big League Bob", "UpWard", "Unidentified Flailing Octopus", "Bad Luck Bob", "The Sandman Cometh", "Biscuit Ballyhoo", "Student Driver Survivor", "Wiener Takes All", "Stuck in an Elevator", "Squidness Protection", "Dome Alone", "Wary Gary", and "Pinned"; Disc 2: "Jeffy T's Prankwell Emporium", "A Taste of Plankton", "Smartificial Intelligence", "Firehouse Bob", "Pablum Plankton", "MuseBob ModelPants", "Delivery of Doom", "My Father the Boat", "Who's Afraid of Mr. Snippers?", "A Fish Called Sandy", "Making Waves", and "Captain Quasar: The Next Iteration"
