= SpongeBob SquarePants season 14 =

Season of television series

SpongeBob SquarePants
- Season 14
- DVD cover
- Showrunners: Marc Ceccarelli; Vincent Waller
- Starring: Tom Kenny; Bill Fagerbakke; Rodger Bumpass; Clancy Brown; Carolyn Lawrence; Mr. Lawrence; Jill Talley; Mary Jo Catlett; Lori Alan
- No. of episodes: 13 (21 segments)

Release
- Original network: Nickelodeon
- Original release: November 2, 2023 – December 2, 2024

Season chronology
- ← Previous; Season 13 Next → Season 15

The fourteenth season of the American animated television series SpongeBob SquarePants, created by former marine biologist and animator Stephen Hillenburg, began airing on Nickelodeon in the United States on November 2, 2023 and ended on December 2, 2024. It consists of 13 episodes. The series chronicles the exploits and adventures of the title character and his various friends in the fictional underwater city of Bikini Bottom.

== Production ==
The season was first announced on March 24, 2022, as part of Nickelodeon's upfront for that year. It was originally announced for 26 episodes until mid-September 2024 when the season was split in half with the second half moving into a fifteenth season. As part of the series' 25th-anniversary celebration, several special episodes were aired in this season. These include the first segment of the 300th episode, "PL-1413"; the two part episode, "Kreepaway Kamp", which simultaneously premiered on both Nickelodeon and Paramount+; the half hour special, "Snow Yellow", which was part of the SpongeBob SquarePants: Another 100 Episodes DVD release before airing on Nickelodeon; and "Sandy's Country Christmas", the season finale and third stop motion episode in the series, which was also part of the Another 100 Episodes DVD before premiering on both Nickelodeon and Paramount+.

== Episodes ==
The episodes are ordered below according to Nickelodeon's packaging order, and not their original production or broadcast order.

No. overall	No. in season	Title	Directed by (Note: Information is taken from the opening credits of each episode.)	Written by	Original release date	U.S. viewers (millions)
294	1	"Single-Celled Defense"	Animation directed by : Michelle Bryan; Supervising direction by : Sherm Cohen	Written by : Danny Giovannini; Storyboarded by : Kurt Snyder (director)	November 2, 2023	0.19
294	1	"Buff for Puff"	Animation directed by : Michelle Bryan; Supervising direction by : Ian Vazquez	Written by : Andrew Goodman; Storyboarded by : Dan Becker (director)	November 20, 2023	0.14
"Single-Celled Defense": Plankton is always getting stepped on, so he has to find a way to defend himself from the steppers. Plankton creates a laser device in his lab which seem to work at first, until he encounters Sandy who sees how dangerous his laser is. Plankton, wanting to learn more, gets taught self-defense lessons from Sandy. "Buff for Puff": Mr. Krabs and Mrs. Puff eat a lot of cheese fondue on their beach date. When Larry saves them from the goo, Mrs. Puff kisses Larry, and the now-out-of-shape Mr. Krabs sees this. Mr. Krabs goes to Larry's gym in a clown disguise to try to get himself back into shape to get Mrs. Puff back.
295	2	"We ♥ Hoops"; We Heart Hoops"	Animation directed by : Andrew Overtoom; Supervising direction by : Dave Cunningham	Written by : Kaz; Storyboarded by : Fred Osmond (director)	November 21, 2023	0.15
295	2	"SpongeChovy"	Animation directed by : Michelle Bryan; Supervising direction by : Sherm Cohen	Written by : Mr. Lawrence; Storyboarded by : Zeus Cervas (director)	November 22, 2023	0.14
"We ♥ Hoops": SpongeBob and Patrick watch an old episode of the Kelpbed Kids show where they see some familiar faces as younger characters, and see their favorite Kelpbed Kid, Hoops, in action. SpongeBob and Patrick get out their hoops in support for Hoops, and see an address on the hoop. They go to that address to meet Hoops, which turns out to be Old Man Walker. When Ajax from the television series they watched earlier returns, Old Man Walker, along with SpongeBob and Patrick, relive a moment from Kelpbed Kids. "SpongeChovy": Anchovies arrive to the Krusty Krab as SpongeBob serves them, until he's left with a to-go order one of the anchovies ordered as the anchovies sweep SpongeBob away to a bus. SpongeBob meeps with an anchovy and morphs into a "faux-chovy" and joins the anchovies' lifestyles. This eventually leads to Patrick, Mr. Krabs, and other customers turning into faux-chovies too, and Squidward has to help stop the faux-chovy invasion.
296	3	"BassWard"	Supervising direction by : Ian Vazquez	Written by : Mike Bell; Storyboarded by : Kurt Snyder (director)	November 23, 2023	0.17
296	3	"Squidiot Box"	Animation directed by : Andrew Overtoom; Supervising direction by : Dave Cunningham	Written by : Luke Brookshier; Storyboarded by : Dan Becker (director)	February 12, 2024	0.20
"BassWard": Squidward and Bubble Bass are on a train together to Jetsam City, where they want to go to a clarinet convention and comic book convention respectively. Bubble Bass ends up being a constant annoyance to Squidward on the train, and the two get booted off after not having tickets, as they fly out the window. Squidward and Bubble Bass then get into all sorts of wild situations to get to their destination.: Note: This is the first episode where SpongeBob does not appear in any way, shape, or form.; "Squidiot Box": SpongeBob is cleaning up his attic and finds his old imagination box, so he takes it outside to see if it still works. It does not, so he and Patrick take it to the Imagination Box Repair and are told the reason it's not working is because the "whimsy gasket" is blown. Patrick throws the box at Squidward's house, causing Squidward to fall inside, and Squidward has to rely on SpongeBob and Patrick's imagination to escape the box he's trapped in.
297	4	"Blood is Thicker Than Grease"	Animation directed by : Michelle Bryan; Supervising direction by : Sherm Cohen	Written by : Luke Brookshier; Storyboarded by : Fred Osmond (director)	July 15, 2024 (Note: This episode first aired on Nicktoons on February 21, 2024.)	0.10
297	4	"Don't Make Me Laugh"	Supervising direction by : Ian Vazquez	Written by : Mr. Lawrence; Storyboarded by : Zeus Cervas (director)	February 12, 2024	0.20
"Blood is Thicker Than Grease": Plankton's parents come to town and start up the potato-based Spud Bucket restaurant right next to the Chum Bucket, overtaking it and the Krusty Krab. While Plankton attempts to sabotage the Spud Bucket, Mr. Krabs and SpongeBob watch and have a laugh as everything will eventually return to the status quo. "Don't Make Me Laugh": SpongeBob's funny bone is triggered after watching a melodrama movie with Patrick and it sends him into a crazed laughing spree, much to the annoyance and disgust of Bikini Bottom. His laughter eventually causes his mouth to take up his entire face.: Guest star: Marion Ross as Grandma SquarePants
298	5	"Momageddon"	Animation directed by : Andrew Overtoom; Supervising direction by : Dave Cunningham	Written by : Mike Bell; Storyboarded by : Kurt Snyder (director)	February 14, 2024	0.18
298	5	"Pet the Rock"	Animation directed by : Michelle Bryan; Supervising direction by : Sherm Cohen	Written by : Danny Giovannini; Storyboarded by : Dan Becker (director)	February 14, 2024	0.18
"Momageddon": SpongeBob, Squidward, and Mr. Krabs' moms come over and make changes to the Krusty Krab, forcing them to become basement boys under the influence of Bubble Bass. "Pet the Rock": Patrick adopts a pet rock he names Rolly, which becomes the apple of rock collector Percival Rockhound's eye, and various physical hijinks ensue. In the end, however, it turns out that Patrick's "pet rock" is actually an egg and it hatches into a humongous dinosaur.: Guest star: Malcolm McDowell as Percival Rockhound
299	6	"Tango Tangle"	Supervising direction by : Ian Vazquez; Animation directed by : Michelle Bryan	Written by : Mr. Lawrence; Storyboarded by : Fred Osmond (director)	February 20, 2024	0.16
299	6	"Necro-Nom-Nom-Nom-I-Con"	Animation directed by : Andrew Overtoom; Supervising direction by : Dave Cunningham	Written by : Luke Brookshier; Storyboarded by : Zeus Cervas (director)	February 26, 2024	0.17
"Tango Tangle": It's Karen's birthday, and Plankton grants her a gift card for tango lessons together. When Karen points out the trouble that comes with the short length of Plankton's legs, he extends them using one of his newest inventions. The two initially struggle in their classes, but with the help of their tango instructor Suzie Groove, they quickly become top of the class. The two then face off against Susie's other top tanglers, who happen to be Bubble Bass and his mom.: Guest star: Rosie Perez as Suzie Groove; "Necro-Nom-Nom-Nom-I-Con": Mr. Krabs sees a local breakfast joint serving breakfast and gets an idea of selling breakfast at the Krusty Krab. Mr. Krabs wants SpongeBob to get a breakfast cookbook he ordered from the bookstore, but ends up getting a magical spell book while a witch gets the cookbook. SpongeBob ends up cooking up chaos in the kitchen with his spell book, making breakfast that gives the customers side effects and transforms them into monsters.
300	7	"PL-1413"	Supervising direction by : Sherm Cohen; Animation directed by : Michelle Bryan	Written by : Danny Giovannini; Storyboarded by : Brian Morante (director)	July 15, 2024	0.10
300	7	"In the Mood to Feud"	Supervising direction by : Ian Vazquez	Written by : Kaz; Storyboarded by : Kurt Snyder (director)	July 16, 2024	0.13
"PL-1413": The mayor of Bikini Bottom and Sandy are hosting a time capsule ceremony, where anything placed in the time capsule is preserved for two thousand years. Seeing Mr. Krabs put a Krabby Patty inside the time capsule, Plankton flies in for a chance to eat the Krabby Patty to know the secret formula. After being locked in the time capsule, Plankton is transported two thousand years into the future into a chrome-plated Bikini Bottom, where he meets future versions of Bikini Bottom's citizens. "In the Mood to Feud": SpongeBob gets an invitation to Narlene and Nobby's annual Bumble Jelly Harvest. SpongeBob, Patrick, and Sandy ride a wagon powered by Narlene's sea mule there, and the mule stops at a portion of Bikini Holler that goes right through Plankton Territory. After the Bumble Jelly harvest and festival, Plankton's family arrives, and SpongeBob, Patrick, and Sandy all find themselves in a feud between the Narwhals and Planktons.
301	8	"Mooned!"	Supervising direction by : Dave Cunningham; Animation directed by : Andrew Overtoom	Written by : Andrew Goodman; Storyboarded by : Dan Becker (director)	July 17, 2024	0.12
301	8	"Hysterical History"	Supervising direction by : Sherm Cohen; Animation directed by : Michelle Bryan	Written by : Danny Giovannini; Storyboarded by : Zeus Cervas (director)	July 18, 2024	0.10
"Mooned!": On the Jellyson Group show, the moon jellyfish, a rare white jellyfish that migrates to Bikini Bottom every 25 years, is discussed. After seeing Kevin C. Cucumber catch the jellyfish, SpongeBob is determined to catch the moon jellyfish himself to prove its existence, so he goes to Kevin for help. Kevin later reveals that the video of him catching the moon jellyfish is fake, so SpongeBob gives him a chance to catch it to prove he's a good jellyfisher, and the two chase and lure the jellyfish around to try and catch it. "Hysterical History": SpongeBob and Patrick take Sandy to Old Man Walker's Bikini Bottom Museum of History, where they teach Sandy all about the history of Bikini Bottom through the museum's various exhibits showing Bikini Bottom in different eras of time, including the ancient past, the pioneer era with its rock, the Industrial Revolution where Mr. Puff made the Model C boat, and the psychedelic sea era.
302	9	"Kreepaway Kamp"	Supervising direction by : Dave Cunningham, Sherm Cohen and Ian Vazquez; Animation directed by : Andrew Overtoom and Michelle Bryan	Written by : Bobby Gaylor and Mike Bell; Storyboarded by : Fred Osmond and Kurt Snyder (director)	October 10, 2024	0.16
303	10	"Kreepaway Kamp"	Supervising direction by : Dave Cunningham, Sherm Cohen and Ian Vazquez; Animation directed by : Andrew Overtoom and Michelle Bryan	Written by : Bobby Gaylor and Mike Bell; Storyboarded by : Fred Osmond and Kurt Snyder (director)	October 10, 2024	0.16
SpongeBob, Patrick, and Sandy are invited to a reunion at Kamp Koral where their old friends end up mysteriously disappearing.
304	11	"Snow Yellow" "Snow Yellow and the Seven Jellies"	Supervising direction by : Sherm Cohen and Dave Cunningham; Animation directed by : Andrew Overtoom and Michelle Bryan	Written by : Mr. Lawrence; Storyboarded by : Dan Becker (director)	November 11, 2024 (Note: This episode was first released on Another 100 Episodes DVD on October 15, 2024.)	0.10
In this spoof of Snow White, Snow Yellow befriends a group of seven jellyfish while seeking refuge from the evil Queen Karen, who wants to cut off his corners so she can be the squarest of them all.
305	12	"The Dirty Bubble Bass"	Supervising direction by : Ian Vazquez	Written by : Luke Brookshier; Storyboarded by : Benjamin Arcand (director)	July 22, 2024	0.19
305	12	"Sheldon SquarePants"	Supervising direction by : Dave Cunningham; Animation directed by : Andrew Overtoom	Written by : Andrew Goodman; Storyboarded by : Fred Osmond (director)	July 23, 2024	0.09
"The Dirty Bubble Bass": Bubble Bass buys a pack of Dirty Bubble trading cards from Near Mint Comic Books to complete his Dirty Bubble memorabilia collection. Bubble Bass then takes a bath with the official Dirty Bubble Bubble Bath, and chews the stick of Dirty Bubble Bubble Gum he found in his pack of trading cards, causing the Dirty Bubble to be released. Dirty Bubble traps Bubble Bass inside himself, and the duo team up to commit villainous acts around Bikini Bottom. "Sheldon SquarePants": While SpongeBob is playing checkers with Patrick, SpongeBob gets a call from his parents, who tell him that they have a surprise for him. The surprise ends up being Plankton being SpongeBob's adopted brother. Plankton wants to use this as an opportunity for SpongeBob to tell him the Krabby Patty secret formula, but before SpongeBob can tell Plankton it, the two do various activities together to get to know each other more.
306	13	"Sandy's Country Christmas"	Mark Caballero & Seamus Walsh; Supervising direction by : Ian Vazquez	Written by : Danny Giovannini; Storyboarded by : Zeus Cervas & Kurt Snyder (director)	December 2, 2024	0.04
In this stop-motion special, Sandy's family from Texas comes over to Bikini Bottom in a surprise visit to celebrate Christmas with her. When Sandy's experiment involving a serum to grow Christmas trees goes awry after twins Rowdy and Rosie Cheeks add too much serum to the Christmas tree, causing it to grow really big and causing Santa to crash into it and land on his head on several branches, it is up to the Cheeks family to save Christmas in Bikini Bottom.: Guest stars: Lewis Black as Santa Claus, Johnny Knoxville as Randy Cheeks, Craig Robinson as Pa Cheeks

== Specials ==
Title	Written by (Note: Information is taken from the closing credits of each episode.)	Original release date	Prod. code	U.S. viewers (millions)
"A Very Patchy Holiday Stream Special"	Benjamin Kurzrock	December 15, 2023	870	0.19
In a clipshow, an animated Patchy the Pirate reminisces about holiday-themed SpongeBob memories on a livestream for series fans.
"SpongeBob's Super Bowl Party"	Benjamin Kurzrock	February 5, 2024	TBA	0.12
SpongeBob and Patrick throw a Super Bowl party and show off their rituals on how to prepare for the game.

== DVD release ==
The DVD boxset for season fourteen was released by Paramount Home Entertainment and Nickelodeon in the United States and Canada on November 19, 2024.

SpongeBob SquarePants: The Complete Fourteenth Season
Set details			Special features
13 episodes (21 segment episodes); 2-disc set; 1.78:1 aspect ratio; Languages: English (Dolby Digital 5.1); Spanish (Dolby Stereo, excluding "Sandy's Country Christmas"); French (Dolby Stereo, excluding "Sandy's Country Christmas")			
Release dates
Region 1	Region 2	Region 4	
November 19, 2024	TBA	TBA	
Episodes
Disc 1: "Single-Celled Defense", "Buff for Puff", "We ♥ Hoops", "SpongeChovy", "BassWard", "Squidiot Box", "Blood is Thicker Than Grease", "Don't Make Me Laugh", "Momageddon", "Pet the Rock", "Tango Tangle", and "Necro-Nom-Nom-Nom-I-Con"; Disc 2: "PL-1413", "In the Mood to Feud", "Mooned!", "Hysterical History", "Kreepaway Kamp", "Snow Yellow", "The Dirty Bubble Bass", "Sheldon SquarePants", and "Sandy's Country Christmas"
